= Orphine =

Orphine is a class of synthetic opioid analgesic drugs, first developed in the 1960s and 1970s by Paul Janssen but categorised as their own distinct grouping by international drug control agencies, such as the EUDA and UNODC in 2025. These have emerged as designer drugs in recent years following increasing legislative controls on earlier families of synthetic opioids such as fentanyls and nitazenes.

Orphines are not structural analogues of morphine (known as morphinans), despite the similar name. Initially, the term referred to compounds such as brorphine and bezitramide (which are related to fentanyls, but with the aniline nitrogen cyclised into a benzimidazole ring system), but subsequently a second group of compounds also came to be referred to under this epithet, namely the spiropiperidine derivatives typified by spirochlorphine (R6890), where the 4-position of the piperidine ring is fused to an N-phenyl imidazole ring through a shared carbon atom. Judged by molecular structure these are distinct types, but they show a similar overlay in terms of their three-dimensional shape, and have similar structure-activity relationships and pharmacology.

As with many other opioid drugs of this type, replacing the "tail" substitution on the piperidine with a p-fluorobutyrophenone produces antipsychotics instead of opioids (benperidol and spiperone respectively). Other substitutions such as N-phenethyl produce a mixture of both opioid and neuroleptic activity which is generally unsuited for either application, so the compounds with potent opioid activity tend to be those with substituted alpha-methyl benzyl or 3,3-diphenylpropyl chains attached to the piperidine nitrogen, as this favors mu opioid receptor binding but disfavors the antagonist binding at dopamine D2-like receptors which produces antipsychotic activity.

A large number of compounds from these two groups are known, but few have been used for legitimate medical applications, aside from bezitramide, which was previously sold as a potent, orally acting analgesic in some European countries under the brand name Burgodin, but withdrawn from sale due to a high potential for overdose.

More recent research has focused on the development of compounds such as J-113,397 and Ro65-6570, which have low affinity for the mu opioid receptor and instead act as ligands for the non-psychoactive nociceptin receptor.

== Table of orphines ==
Structure	Name	Chemical Formula	Molecular Weight (g/mol)	Chemical name	PubChem	CAS #
	Brorphine	C_{20}H_{22}BrN_{3}O	400.3	3-{1-[1-(4-bromophenyl)ethyl]piperidin-4-yl}-1H-benzimidazol-2-one	145975294	2244737-98-0
	Chlorphine (R5682)	C_{20}H_{22}ClN_{3}O	355.9	1-{1-[1-(4-chlorophenyl)ethyl]piperidin-4-yl}-1,3-dihydro-2H-benzimidazol-2-one	60561198	6440-26-2
	Fluorphine	C_{20}H_{22}FN_{3}O	339.4	1-{1-[1-(4-fluorophenyl)ethyl]piperidin-4-yl}-1,3-dihydro-2H-benzimidazol-2-one	145964378	6440-42-2
	Iodorphine	C_{20}H_{22}IN_{3}O	447.3	1-{1-[1-(4-iodophenyl)ethyl]piperidin-4-yl}-1,3-dihydro-2H-benzimidazol-2-one	165362482	
	Methylorphine	C_{21}H_{25}N_{3}O	335.5	1-(1-(1-(p-tolyl)ethyl)piperidin-4-yl)-1H-benzo[d]imidazol-2(3H)-one	172968061	47434-20-8
	Methoxyorphine	C_{21}H_{25}N_{3}O_{2}	351.5	1,3-dihydro-1-[1-[1-(4-methoxyphenyl)ethyl]-4-piperidinyl]-2H-benzimidazol-2-one	145963850	2244737-99-1
	Orphine	C_{20}H_{23}N_{3}O	321.4	1-{1-[1-phenylethyl]piperidin-4-yl}-1,3-dihydro-2H-benzimidazol-2-one	21262767	59708-49-5
	R4782	C_{19}H_{21}N_{3}O	307.2	3-(1-benzylpiperidin-4-yl)-1H-benzimidazol-2-one	416359	16148-06-4
	R6555	C_{21}H_{24}ClN_{3}O	369.2	3-[1-[1-(4-chlorophenyl)propyl]piperidin-4-yl]-1H-benzimidazol-2-one	145965998	6440-25-1
	N-Propionitrile orphine	C_{23}H_{26}N_{4}O	374.5	3-[3-[1-(1-phenylethyl)piperidin-4-yl]-2-oxobenzimidazol-1-yl]propanenitrile		
	Cychlorphine (N-propionitrile chlorphine)	C_{23}H_{25}ClN_{4}O	408.9	3-[3-[1-[1-(4-chlorophenyl)ethyl]piperidin-4-yl]-2-oxobenzimidazol-1-yl]propanenitrile	201662	16145-71-4
	N-Propionitrile brorphine (Cybrorphine)	C_{23}H_{25}BrN_{4}O	453.4	3-[3-[1-[1-(4-bromophenyl)ethyl]piperidin-4-yl]-2-oxobenzimidazol-1-yl]propanenitrile		
	N-Propionitrile 5-chloro desmethylbrorphine	C_{22}H_{22}BrClN_{4}O	473.8	3-(3-(1-(4-bromobenzyl)piperidin-4-yl)-6-chloro-2-oxo-2,3-dihydro-1H-benzo[d]imidazole-1-yl)propanenitrile		
	Cymethorphine (N-Propionitrile methylorphine, Warorphan)	C_{24}H_{28}N_{4}O	388.2	3-[3-[1-[1-(4-methylphenyl)ethyl]piperidin-4-yl]-2-oxobenzimidazol-1-yl]propanenitrile		92281-62-4
	R5480	C_{27}H_{29}N_{3}O	383.2	1-[1-(3,3-diphenylpropyl)piperidin-4-yl]-1,3-dihydro-2H-1,3-benzimidazol-2-one		
	Bezitramide	C_{31}H_{32}N_{4}O_{2}	492.6	4-[4-(2-oxo-3-propanoyl-2,3-dihydro-1H-benzimidazol-1-yl)piperidin-1-yl]-2,2-diphenylbutanenitrile	61791	15301-48-1
	Despropionylbezitramide	C_{28}H_{28}N_{4}O	436.6	4-[4-(2-oxo-3H-benzimidazol-1-yl)piperidin-1-yl]-2,2-diphenylbutanenitrile	3086173	83898-28-6
	R4837 (Etodezitramide)	C_{30}H_{33}N_{3}O_{2}	467.6	3-[1-(4-oxo-3,3-diphenylhexyl)piperidin-4-yl]-1H-benzimidazol-2-one	98813	59708-47-3
	Cyetodezitramide	C_{33}H_{36}N_{4}O_{2}	520.7	3-[2-oxo-3-[1-(4-oxo-3,3-diphenylhexyl)piperidin-4-yl]benzimidazol-1-yl]propanenitrile	24834847	97656-45-6
	SR-11501	C_{22}H_{25}N_{3}O_{3}	379.5	3-[1-[1-(2,3-dihydro-1,4-benzodioxin-6-yl)ethyl]piperidin-4-yl]-1H-benzimidazol-2-one	146025598	?
	SR-14968	C_{20}H_{20}BrCl_{2}N_{3}O	469.2	3-[1-[1-(4-bromophenyl)ethyl]piperidin-4-yl]-5,6-dichloro-1H-benzimidazol-2-one	130431386	2133455-40-8
	SR-14969	C_{20}H_{19}Cl_{3}FN_{3}O	442.7	5,6-dichloro-3-[1-[1-(4-chloro-2-fluorophenyl)ethyl]piperidin-4-yl]-1H-benzimidazol-2-one	146025599	?
	SR-15098	C_{19}H_{17}Cl_{3}FN_{3}O	428.7	5,6-dichloro-3-[1-[(4-chloro-2-fluorophenyl)methyl]piperidin-4-yl]-1H-benzimidazol-2-one	130431384	?
	SR-15099	C_{19}H_{18}BrCl_{2}N_{3}O	455.2	3-[1-[(4-bromophenyl)methyl]piperidin-4-yl]-5,6-dichloro-1H-benzimidazol-2-one	130431412	?
	SR-11099	C_{19}H_{19}Cl_{2}N_{3}O	376.3	5-chloro-1-[1-[(2-chlorophenyl)methyl]-4-piperidinyl]-1,3-dihydro-2H-benzimidazol-2-one	145978786	
	5-Chloro desmethylchlorphine	C_{19}H_{19}Cl_{2}N_{3}O	376.3	5-chloro-1-[1-[(4-chlorophenyl)methyl]-4-piperidinyl]-1,3-dihydro-2H-benzimidazol-2-one		2575731-77-8
	SR-17018 (5,6‑dichloro-desmethyl-chlorphine)	C_{19}H_{18}Cl_{3}N_{3}O	410.7	5,6-dichloro-3-[1-[(4-chlorophenyl)methyl]piperidin-4-yl]-1H-benzimidazol-2-one	130431397	2134602-45-0
	J-113,397	C_{24}H_{37}N_{3}O_{2}	399.6	1-[(3R,4R)-1-cyclooctylmethyl-3-hydroxymethyl-4-piperidyl]-3-ethyl-1, 3-dihydro-2H-benzimidazol-2-one	5311194	256640-45-6
	SR-14136	C_{22}H_{25}N_{3}O	347.5	3-[(2R,6S,9aR)-6-phenyl-2,3,4,6,7,8,9,9a-octahydro-1H-quinolizin-2-yl]-1H-benzimidazol-2-one	10066285	
	Muzepan1	C_{21}H_{22}BrCl_{2}N_{3}O	483.2	3-[1-[1-(4-bromophenyl)ethyl]azepan-4-yl]-5,6-dichloro-1H-benzimidazol-2-one	178248567	?
	Muzepan2	C_{21}H_{21}Cl_{3}FN_{3}O	456.8	3-[1-[1-(2-fluoro-4-chlorophenyl)ethyl]azepan-4-yl]-5,6-dichloro-1H-benzimidazol-2-one	?	?
	Spirorphine	C_{21}H_{25}N_{3}O	335.2	8-(1-phenylethyl)-1-phenyl-1,3,8-triazaspiro[4.5]decan-4-one	44438920	2940-58-1
	N-Methyl-spirorphine	C_{22}H_{27}N_{3}O	349.2	8-(1-phenylethyl)-3-methyl-1-phenyl-1,3,8-triazaspiro[4.5]decan-4-one		
	Spirofluorphine	C_{21}H_{24}FN_{3}O	353.2	8-[1-(4-fluorophenyl)ethyl]-1-phenyl-1,3,8-triazaspiro[4.5]decan-4-one		
	Spirochlorphine (R6890)	C_{21}H_{24}ClN_{3}O	369.2	8-[1-(4-chlorophenyl)ethyl]-1-phenyl-1,3,8-triazaspiro[4.5]decan-4-one	14783734	3222-88-6
	Spirobrorphine	C_{21}H_{24}BrN_{3}O	414.3	8-[1-(4-bromophenyl)ethyl]-1-phenyl-1,3,8-triazaspiro[4.5]decan-4-one	177864517	
	R6372	C_{22}H_{27}N_{3}O	349.5	8-[1-(4-methylphenyl)ethyl]-1-phenyl-1,3,8-triazaspiro[4.5]decan-4-one	200932	2940-60-5
	R5573	C_{28}H_{31}N_{3}O	425.6	8-(3,3-diphenylpropyl)-1-phenyl-1,3,8-triazaspiro[4.5]decan-4-one	9802509	
	R-5260	C_{31}H_{35}N_{3}O_{2}	481.6	8-(4-oxo-3,3-diphenylhexyl)-1-phenyl-1,3,8-triazaspiro[4.5]decan-4-one	3081947	1109-69-9
	BRN 0633766	C_{29}H_{30}N_{4}O	450.6	4-(4-oxo-1-phenyl-1,3,8-triazaspiro[4.5]decan-8-yl)-2,2-diphenylbutanenitrile	14001	1062-15-3
	Spiroxatrine	C_{22}H_{25}N_{3}O_{3}	379.5	8-(2,3-Dihydro-1,4-benzodioxin-2-ylmethyl)-1-phenyl-1,3,8-triazaspiro[4.5]decan-4-one	5268	1054-88-2
	Ro65-6570	C_{22}H_{25}N_{3}O	383.5	8-(1,2-dihydroacenaphthylen-1-yl)-1-phenyl-1,3,8-triazaspiro[4.5]decan-4-one	10022859	228246-56-8
	Ro64-6198	C_{26}H_{31}N_{3}O	401.5	8-[(1S,3aS)-2,3,3a,4,5,6-hexahydro-1H-phenalen-1-yl]-1-phenyl-1,3,8-triazaspiro[4.5]decan-4-one	9844019	280783-56-4

== See also ==
- List of benzimidazole opioids
- List of fentanyl analogues
- Utopioid (drug class)
