= R6890 =

Opioid analgesic

Spirochlorphine

Clinical data
- Other names: Spirochlorphine

Identifiers
- IUPAC name: 8-[1-(4-chlorophenyl)ethyl]-1-phenyl-1,3,8-triazaspiro[4.5]decan-4-one
- CAS Number: 3222-88-6
- PubChem CID: 14783734
- ChemSpider: 21257352
- ChEMBL: ChEMBL312281

Chemical and physical data
- Formula: C_{21}H_{24}ClN_{3}O
- Molar mass: 369.89 g·mol^{−1}
- 3D model (JSmol): Interactive image
- SMILES: CC(C1=CC=C(C=C1)Cl)N2CCC3(CC2)C(=O)NCN3C4=CC=CC=C4
- InChI: InChI=1S/C21H24ClN3O/c1-16(17-7-9-18(22)10-8-17)24-13-11-21(12-14-24)20(26)23-15-25(21)19-5-3-2-4-6-19/h2-10,16H,11-15H2,1H3,(H,23,26); Key:KFEYPBZJPJJRFX-UHFFFAOYSA-N

R6890, sometimes known as spirochlorphine, is an orphine opioid analgesic and a member of the spiropiperidine family of agents. The first known mention of this compound was in 1977. Other examples of agents from this class are Ro64-6198 and Ro65-6570. Brorphine also has a similar structure. It has been sold as a designer drug, and was proposed for placement on the Schedule 1 list in the USA on 1 July 2026. Spirochlorphine is a Schedule V controlled substance in Canada.

A precursor chemical used in the synthesis of R6890 is 1-phenyl-1,3,8-triazaspiro(4,5)decan-4-one (also known as spirodecanone), which is used in the synthesis of other drugs including spirilene, fluspirilene, spiramide, spiperone, RP-23618, spiroxatrine, L008716 and R5260.

== Pharmacology ==
The pharmacology of R6890 is described as a nociceptin receptor (NOP) agonist, although R6890 retains significant affinity at the mu opioid receptor in an animal model. R6890 has affinities (K_{i} values) of 4, 75, and 10 nM for the mu, delta, and the total opioid receptor population, respectively.

== See also ==
- Cychlorphine
- R6372
- List of orphine opioids
