= Spirodecanone =

Names
- Other names 1-Phenyl-1,3,8-triazaspiro[4,5]decan-4-one

Identifiers
| CAS Number | 1021-25-6 |
| 3D model (JSmol) | Interactive image |
| ChEMBL | ChEMBL309711 |
| ChemSpider | 63725 |
| EC Number | 213-819-5 |
| MeSH | spirodecanone |
| PubChem CID | 70556 |
| CompTox Dashboard (EPA) | DTXSID00144635 |
- InChI: InChI=1S/C13H17N3O/c17-12-13(6-8-14-9-7-13)16(10-15-12)11-4-2-1-3-5-11/h1-5,14H,6-10H2,(H,15,17) Key: HTQWGIHCFPWKAS-UHFFFAOYSA-N
- SMILES: C1CNCCC12C(=O)NCN2C3=CC=CC=C3

Properties
| Chemical formula | C_{13}H_{17}N_{3}O |
| Molar mass | 231.299 g·mol^{−1} |
| Density | g/cm^{3} (20 °C) |

Hazards
- GHS labelling
| Pictograms | (GHS07: Exclamation mark) |
| Signal word | Warning |
| Hazard statements | H315, H319, H335 |
| Precautionary statements | P261, P264, P264+P265, P271, P280, P302+P352, P304+P340, P305+P351+P338, P319, P321, P332+P317, P337+P317, P362+P364, P403+P233, P405, P501 |
- Except where otherwise noted, data are given for materials in their standard state (at 25 °C [77 °F], 100 kPa). Infobox references

Spirodecanone refers to a class of spirocyclic ketones, often studied for their potential applications in medicinal chemistry. One notable example is 1-Phenyl-1,3,8-triazaspiro[4.5]decan-4-one, which has been investigated as a metabolite of neuroleptic agents like Fluspirilene. It has a molecular formula of C_{13}H_{17}N_{3}O and a melting point of 188-191 °C.

== Synthesis ==
The original synthesis was first disclosed by Paul Janssen, and was covered by Daniel Lednicer in one of his books.

A recent synthesis of spirodecanone is disclosed:

The Strecker-like condensation between N-benzyl-4-piperidone [3612-20-2] (1), aniline and TMSCN [7677-24-9], gives 4-anilino-1-benzylpiperidine-4-carbonitrile [968-86-5] (2). Acid catalyzed partial hydrolysis of the nitrile to the amide afforded 4-anilino-1-benzylpiperidine-4-carboxamide [1096-03-3] (3). Reaction with DMF-DMA forms the spiroimidazolidone ring giving 8-benzyl-1-phenyl-1,3,8-triazaspiro[4.5]dec-2-en-4-one [974-42-5] (4). The imine bond is reduced with sodium borohydride giving 8-benzyl-1-phenyl-1,3,8-triaza-spiro[4.5]decan-4-one [974-41-4] (5). Catalytic hydrogenation then removes the benzyl group (6).

It is noteworthy to mention that intermediate 4 finds dual use in the synthesis of some highly potent fentanyl analogs.

== Applications ==
Listed in alphabetical order:

1. DiPOA
2. Fluspiperone is similar but with additional para-fluoro.
3. Fluspirilene
4. L008716
5. Phencyclidine analog
6. R-5260 [1109-69-9] (normethadone analog)
7. R 6890 (spirochlorphine)
8. RP-23618 [207991-30-8]
9. Spiramide
10. Spiroxatrine contains a Benzodioxan sidechain.
11. Spirilene [357-66-4]
12. Spiperone
13. Ro64-6198 & Ro65-6570 (NOP receptor agonist).
14. BRN 4620880 [99756-32-8]
15. 8-(5,8-Dichloro-1,2,3,4-tetrahydro-2-naphthyl)-1-phenyl-1,3,8-triaza-spiro(4.5)decan-4-one.
