= SR-14136 =

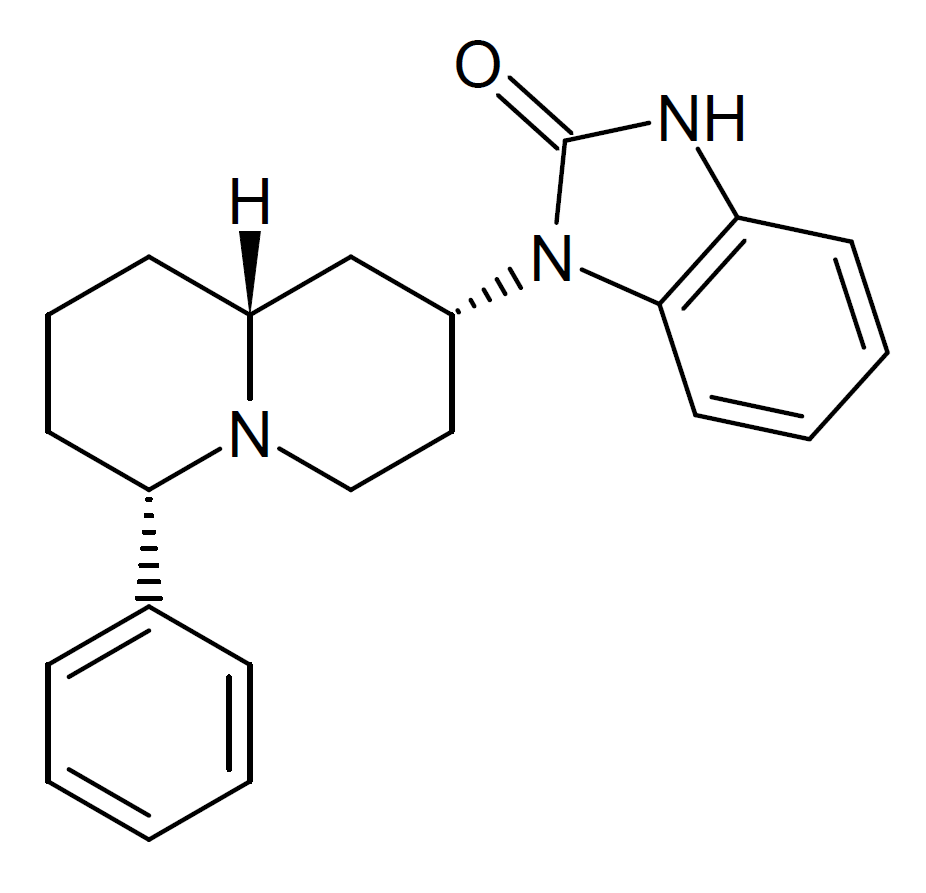

Clinical data
- Other names: SR14136
- Drug class: κ-Opioid receptor agonist

Identifiers
- IUPAC name: 3-[(2R,6S,9aR)-6-phenyl-2,3,4,6,7,8,9,9a-octahydro-1H-quinolizin-2-yl]-1H-benzimidazol-2-one
- PubChem CID: 10066285
- ChemSpider: 8241825
- ChEMBL: ChEMBL51972

Chemical and physical data
- Formula: C_{22}H_{25}N_{3}O
- Molar mass: 347.462 g·mol^{−1}
- 3D model (JSmol): Interactive image
- SMILES: C1C[C@@H]2C[C@@H](CCN2[C@@H](C1)C3=CC=CC=C3)N4C5=CC=CC=C5NC4=O
- InChI: InChI=1S/C22H25N3O/c26-22-23-19-10-4-5-11-21(19)25(22)18-13-14-24-17(15-18)9-6-12-20(24)16-7-2-1-3-8-16/h1-5,7-8,10-11,17-18,20H,6,9,12-15H2,(H,23,26)/t17-,18-,20+/m1/s1; Key:KMUYAJQKQQUKSQ-GGPKGHCWSA-N

SR-14136 is a synthetic opioid receptor agonist from the orphine series. It acts primarily as a highly potent agonist for the kappa opioid receptor, being around 10x more potent than the reference kappa agonist U-69593, and is also an agonist at the nociceptin receptor with only slightly lower potency. It has substantially weaker activity at the mu opioid receptor, at which it is a partial agonist.

== See also ==
- κ-Opioid receptor agonist
- J-113,397
- SR-17018
- Utopioid (drug class)
