= N-Propionitrile brorphine =

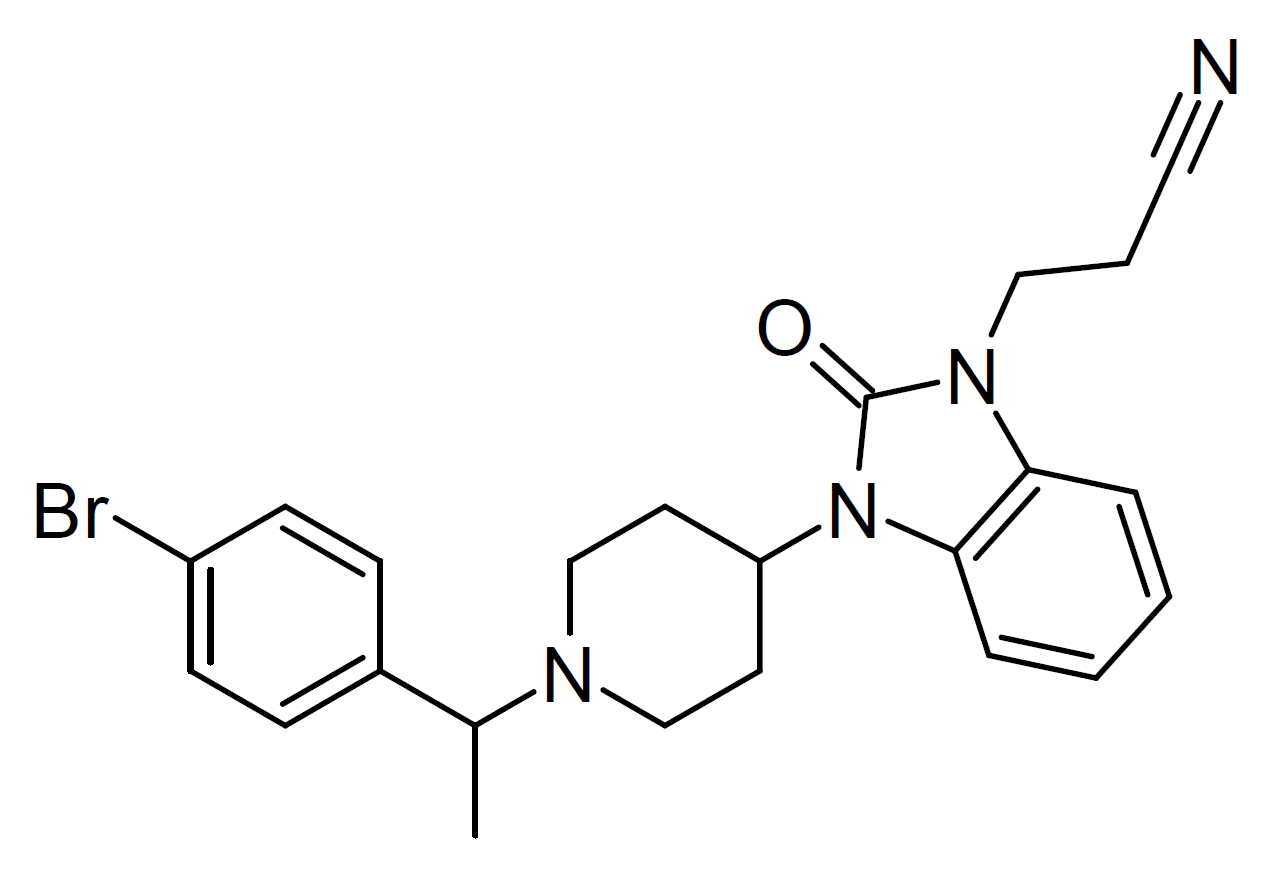

Identifiers
- IUPAC name: 3-[3-[1-[1-(4-Bromophenyl)ethyl]piperidin-4-yl]-2-oxobenzimidazol-1-yl]propanenitrile

Chemical and physical data
- Formula: C_{23}H_{25}BrN_{4}O
- Molar mass: 453.384 g·mol^{−1}
- 3D model (JSmol): Interactive image
- SMILES: CC(C1=CC=C(Br)C=C1)N2CCC(N3C(N(CCC#N)C4=C3C=CC=C4)=O)CC2
- InChI: InChI=InChI=1S/C23H25BrN4O/c1-17(18-7-9-19(24)10-8-18)26-15-11-20(12-16-26)28-22-6-3-2-5-21(22)27(23(28)29)14-4-13-25/h2-3,5-10,17,20H,4,11-12,14-16H2,1H3; Key:KKMLKZDRZWLZFT-UHFFFAOYSA-N

N-Propionitrile brorphine (cybrorphine) is a synthetic opioid chemical compound which has been sold as a designer drug, first reported in New York State in April 2026 as a component of mixtures with other opioid or sedative drugs such as fentanyl and medetomidine. Its pharmacology has not yet been studied, but given its close chemical similarity to potent synthetic opioids such as brorphine and cychlorphine, it is expected to have similar effects.

== See also ==
- Bezitramide
- Spirobrorphine
- List of orphine opioids
