= R-5260 =

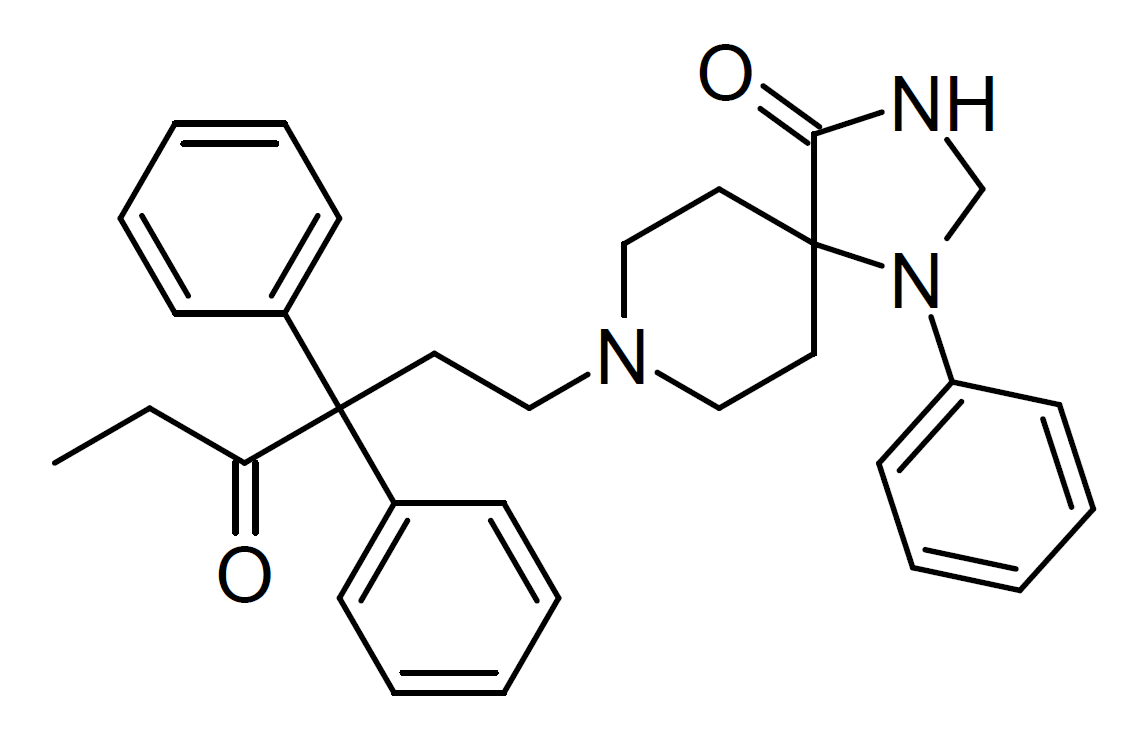

Identifiers
- IUPAC name: 8-(4-oxo-3,3-diphenylhexyl)-1-phenyl-1,3,8-triazaspiro[4.5]decan-4-one
- CAS Number: 1109-69-9
- PubChem CID: 3081947
- ChemSpider: 2339444
- CompTox Dashboard (EPA): DTXSID40149407

Chemical and physical data
- Formula: C_{31}H_{35}N_{3}O_{2}
- Molar mass: 481.640 g·mol^{−1}
- 3D model (JSmol): Interactive image
- SMILES: CCC(=O)C(CCN1CCC2(CC1)C(=O)NCN2C3=CC=CC=C3)(C4=CC=CC=C4)C5=CC=CC=C5
- InChI: InChI=1S/C31H35N3O2/c1-2-28(35)31(25-12-6-3-7-13-25,26-14-8-4-9-15-26)20-23-33-21-18-30(19-22-33)29(36)32-24-34(30)27-16-10-5-11-17-27/h3-17H,2,18-24H2,1H3,(H,32,36); Key:JRKPMOPTZORQSV-UHFFFAOYSA-N

R-5260 is an opioid drug from the orphine series, which is a derivative of the opioid analgesic norpipanone, but with the piperidine ring fused with a spiro heterocycle. It was discovered by Janssen Pharmaceutica, and is a highly potent opioid around 10x the potency of fentanyl in a rodent model of analgesia undertaken before the MOR and NOP receptors had been differentiated. It is related to other potent opioid derivatives such as dipipanone, bezitramide, R-4066 and spirochlorphine, and is also related to dopamine antagonist neuroleptic drugs such as spiperone and fluspirilene, although R-5260 does not have any dopamine antagonist activity itself.

== See also ==
- Spirodecanone
