= C22H25N3O =

The molecular formula C_{22}H_{25}N_{3}O (molar mass: 347.45 g/mol, exact mass: 347.1998 u) may refer to:

- Diallyllysergamide
- Indoramin
- PARGY-LAD
- THQ-PINACA
- CUMYL-CBMINACA
- SR-14136
