= Deekonda2016 =

Chemical compound

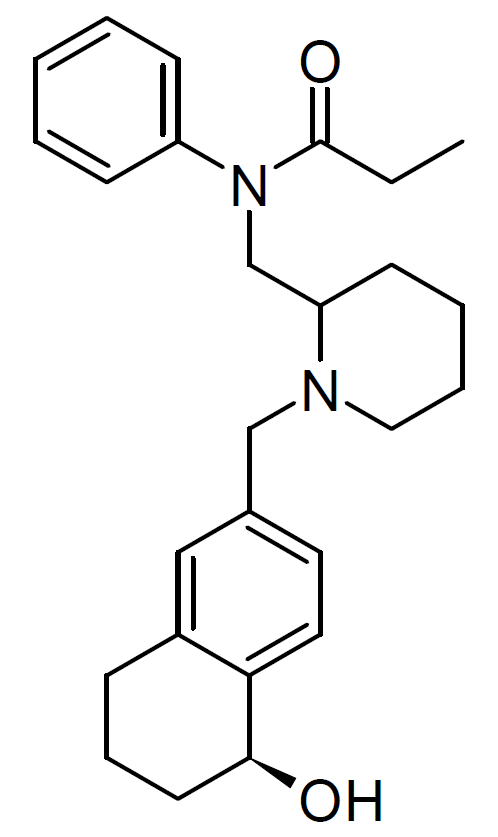

Identifiers
- IUPAC name: N-[[1-[[(5S)-5-hydroxy-5,6,7,8-tetrahydronaphthalen-2-yl]methyl]piperidin-2-yl]methyl]-N-phenylpropanamide
- CAS Number: 1849034-34-9
- PubChem CID: 127037397
- ChemSpider: 58920549
- ChEMBL: ChEMBL3753293

Chemical and physical data
- Formula: C_{26}H_{34}N_{2}O_{2}
- Molar mass: 406.570 g·mol^{−1}
- 3D model (JSmol): Interactive image
- SMILES: CCC(=O)N(CC1CCCCN1CC2=CC3=C(C=C2)[C@H](CCC3)O)C4=CC=CC=C4
- InChI: InChI=1S/C26H34N2O2/c1-2-26(30)28(22-10-4-3-5-11-22)19-23-12-6-7-16-27(23)18-20-14-15-24-21(17-20)9-8-13-25(24)29/h3-5,10-11,14-15,17,23,25,29H,2,6-9,12-13,16,18-19H2,1H3/t23?,25-/m0/s1; Key:MSWKQEUSFJHFAI-YNMFNDETSA-N

Deekonda2016 is a piperidine-based opioid analgesic compound, developed through modification of the fentanyl scaffold and with similar potency to fentanyl. It was designed as a mixed μ/δ opioid agonist but is much more selective for the μ-opioid receptor, with a binding affinity of 4 nM.

== See also ==
- Brorphine
- Fentanyl tropane
- Phenampromide
- R6890
- Secofentanyl
- List of fentanyl analogues
