= PZM21 =

Chemical compound

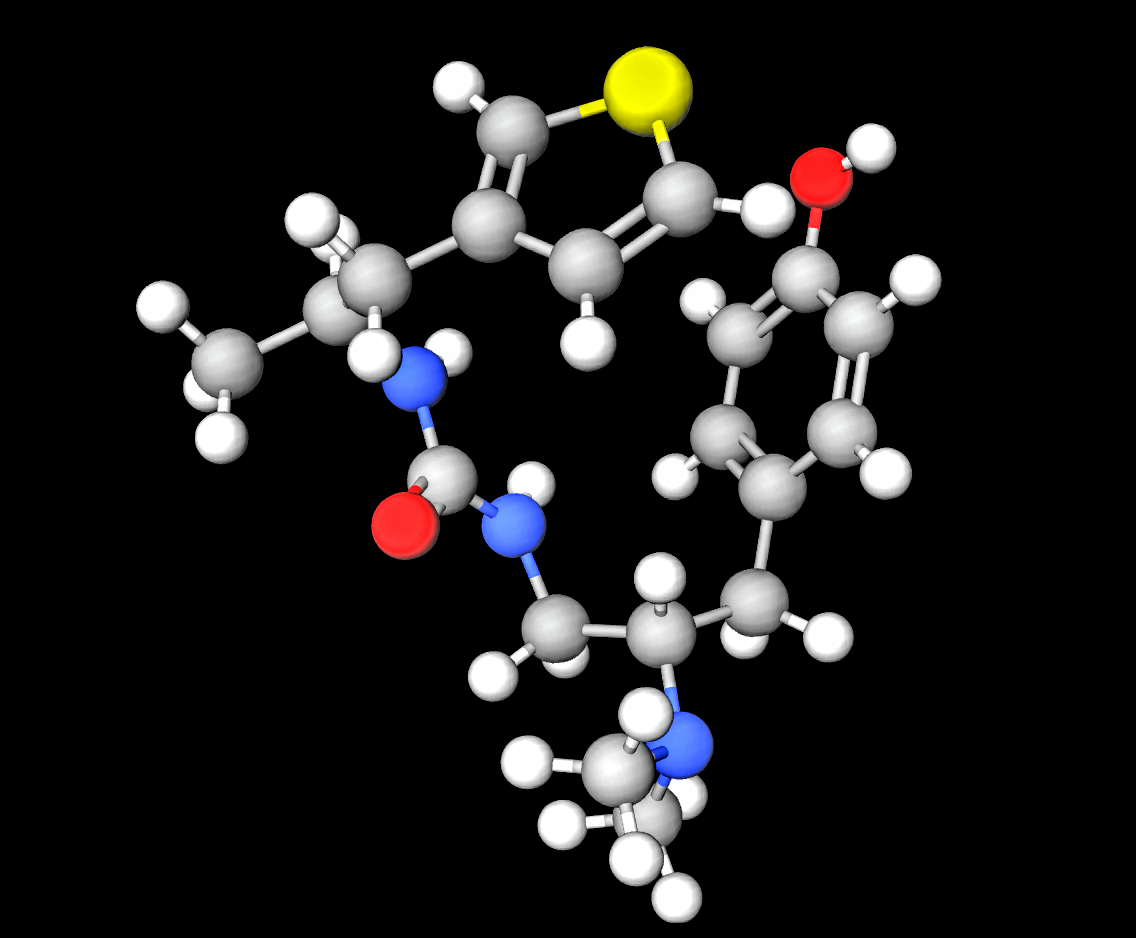

Identifiers
- IUPAC name: 1-[(2S)-2-(Dimethylamino)-3-(4-hydroxyphenyl)propyl]-3-[(2S)-1-(thiophen-3-yl)propan-2-yl]urea
- CAS Number: 1997387-43-5
- PubChem CID: 121596705
- DrugBank: DB14030
- ChemSpider: 58145207
- UNII: M8GB23F27E
- PDB ligand: 8QY (PDBe, RCSB PDB)
- CompTox Dashboard (EPA): DTXSID401117979

Chemical and physical data
- Formula: C_{19}H_{27}N_{3}O_{2}S
- Molar mass: 361.50 g·mol^{−1}
- 3D model (JSmol): Interactive image
- SMILES: O=C(N[C@H](CC1=CSC=C1)C)NC[C@H](CC2=CC=C(O)C=C2)N(C)C
- InChI: InChI=1S/C19H27N3O2S/c1-14(10-16-8-9-25-13-16)21-19(24)20-12-17(22(2)3)11-15-4-6-18(23)7-5-15/h4-9,13-14,17,23H,10-12H2,1-3H3,(H2,20,21,24)/t14-,17-/m0/s1; Key:MEDBIJOVZJEMBI-YOEHRIQHSA-N

PZM21 is an experimental opioid analgesic drug that is being researched for the treatment of pain. It is claimed to be a functionally selective μ-opioid receptor agonist which produces μ-opioid receptor mediated G protein signaling, with potency and efficacy similar to morphine, but with less β-arrestin 2 recruitment. However, recent reports highlight that this might be due to its low intrinsic efficacy, rather than functional selectivity or 'G protein bias' as initially reported. In tests on mice, PZM21 was slightly less potent than morphine or TRV130 as an analgesic, but also had significantly reduced adverse effects, with less constipation than morphine, and very little respiratory depression, even at high doses. This research was described as a compelling example of how modern high-throughput screening techniques can be used to discover new chemotypes with specific activity profiles, even at targets such as the μ-opioid receptor which have already been thoroughly investigated. More recent research has suggested however that at higher doses, PZM21 is capable of producing classic opioid side effects such as respiratory depression and development of tolerance and may have only limited functional selectivity. A number of derivatives have subsequently been developed using PZM21 as a parent compound, and it has become an important tool compound for studying biased mu opioid agonists with reduced abuse liability.

== See also ==
- μ-Opioid receptor § Biased agonists
- Cebranopadol
- DPI-3290
- AT-076
- AT-121
