= NMSP =

NMSP may refer to:

- N-Methylspiperone
- National Movement for Stability and Progress
- New Mexico State Police
- New Mon State Party
