= Spirobrorphine =

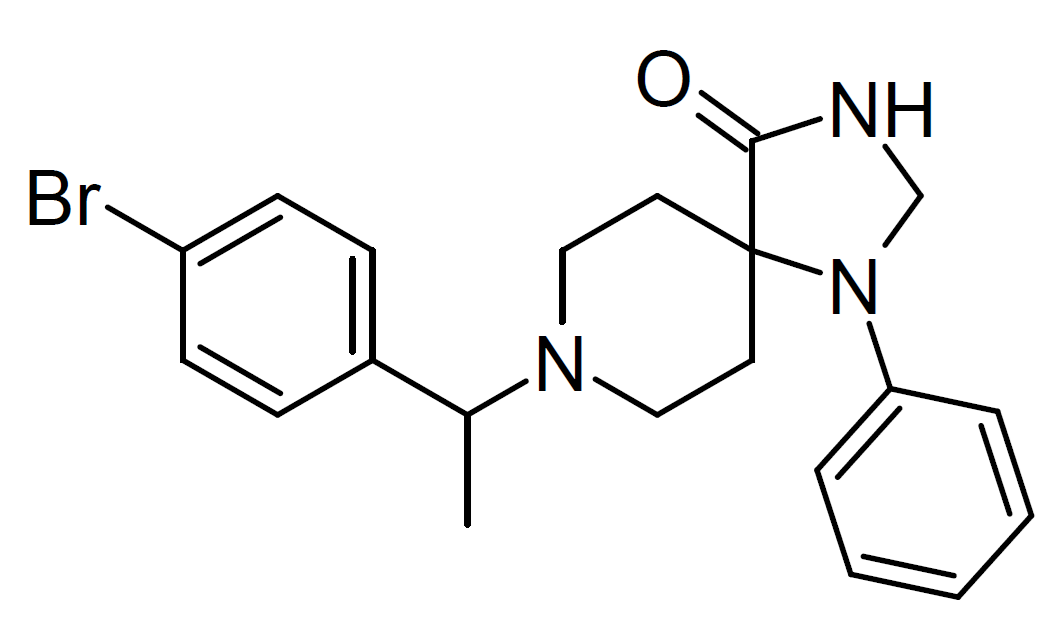

Identifiers
- IUPAC name: 8-[1-(4-bromophenyl)ethyl]-1-phenyl-1,3,8-triazaspiro[4.5]decan-4-one
- PubChem CID: 177864517
- ChemSpider: 133330325

Chemical and physical data
- Formula: C_{21}H_{24}BrN_{3}O
- Molar mass: 414.347 g·mol^{−1}
- 3D model (JSmol): Interactive image
- SMILES: CC(C1=CC=C(C=C1)Br)N2CCC3(CC2)C(=O)NCN3C4=CC=CC=C4
- InChI: InChI=1S/C21H24BrN3O/c1-16(17-7-9-18(22)10-8-17)24-13-11-21(12-14-24)20(26)23-15-25(21)19-5-3-2-4-6-19/h2-10,16H,11-15H2,1H3,(H,23,26); Key:BKVHJNVMUACENG-UHFFFAOYSA-N

Spirobrorphine is a synthetic opioid chemical compound which has been sold as a designer drug, first reported in the USA in February 2026. It was added to Schedule V of the Controlled Drugs and Substances Act in Canada in June 2026. Its pharmacology has not yet been studied but it is believed to be a potent opioid narcotic in a similar manner to related compounds such as spirochlorphine and R6372.

== See also ==
- N-Propionitrile brorphine
- List of orphine opioids
