= C22H27N3O =

The molecular formula C_{22}H_{27}N_{3}O (molar mass: 349.4713 g/mol) may refer to:

- AL-LAD, or 6-allyl-6-nor-LSD
- CYP-LAD
- LA-Azepane
- R6372
- CUMYL-PINACA, also known as SGT-24
