= Atoxifent =

Clinical data
- Drug class: painkiller; opioid

Identifiers
- IUPAC name: 3-[(1S,5R)-3-(3-phenylpropyl)-3,8-diazabicyclo[3.2.1]octan-8-yl]phenol
- CAS Number: 3047944-50-0
- PubChem CID: 171663348
- ChEMBL: ChEMBL5523416

Chemical and physical data
- Formula: C_{21}H_{26}N_{2}O
- Molar mass: 322.452 g·mol^{−1}
- 3D model (JSmol): Interactive image
- SMILES: C1C[C@H]2CN(C[C@@H]1N2C3=CC(=CC=C3)O)CCCC4=CC=CC=C4
- InChI: InChI=InChI=1S/C21H26N2O/c24-21-10-4-9-18(14-21)23-19-11-12-20(23)16-22(15-19)13-5-8-17-6-2-1-3-7-17/h1-4,6-7,9-10,14,19-20,24H,5,8,11-13,15-16H2/t19-,20+; Key:PEXKBSSCTUNEBX-BGYRXZFFSA-N

Atoxifent It is an extremely potent opioid; its pain-relieving effect is comparable to that of fentanyl, and atoxifent, even at doses that induce complete analgesia, does not cause severe respiratory depression.

== Pharmacology ==
=== Pharmacodynamics ===
Atoxifent is an agonist of the μ-opioid and δ-opioid receptors. its EC_{50} value for MOR is 0.39 ± 0.03 nM, with an efficacy (E_{max}) of 98.9 ± 0.6 per cent. Atoxifent is a partial agonist of δ-opioid receptors with an EC_{50} value of 2.18 ± 0.50 nM and an E_{max} of 56.8 ± 11.0% it is a full κ-opioid receptor antagonist with an EC_{50} value of 356.50 ± 106.49 nM and an E_{max} of 93.0 ± 2.0 per cent. It showed no affinity for nociceptin receptors.
