= Brorphine =

Chemical compound

Clinical data
- Addiction liability: Very High

Legal status
- Legal status: BR: Class F1 (Prohibited narcotics); US: Schedule I

Identifiers
- IUPAC name: 3-{1-[1-(4-bromophenyl)ethyl]piperidin-4-yl}-1H-benzimidazol-2-one
- CAS Number: 2244737-98-0
- PubChem CID: 145975294
- ChemSpider: 90669218
- KEGG: C22777
- ChEMBL: ChEMBL4203403
- CompTox Dashboard (EPA): DTXSID201027168

Chemical and physical data
- Formula: C_{20}H_{22}BrN_{3}O
- Molar mass: 400.320 g·mol^{−1}
- 3D model (JSmol): Interactive image
- SMILES: CC(C1=CC=C(C=C1)Br)N2CCC(CC2)N3C4=CC=CC=C4NC3=O
- InChI: InChI=1S/C20H22BrN3O/c1-14(15-6-8-16(21)9-7-15)23-12-10-17(11-13-23)24-19-5-3-2-4-18(19)22-20(24)25/h2-9,14,17H,10-13H2,1H3,(H,22,25); Key:CNOFBGYRMCBVLO-UHFFFAOYSA-N

Brorphine is a piperidine-based opioid analgesic compound. Brorphine was originally described in a 2018 paper investigating functionally biased opioid compounds, with the intention of finding safer analgesics that produce less respiratory depression than typical opioids. Brorphine was originally reported to be highly biased, with an EC_{50} of 4.8nM for GTPγS binding and 182nM for β-arrestin recruitment, however a more recent study found no significant bias for any of the compounds tested, including brorphine. Its safety profile in any animal model has never been established.

In a study involving human lymphoblastoid TK6 cells looking at the possible mutagenic effect of several orphine analogues, brophine was shown to have a marked cytostatic effect but no mutagenic properties.

Despite the lack of safety information on the compound, brorphine has been sold as a designer drug since mid-2019, initially being identified in the US Midwest, though it has since been found in 2020 in Belgium. It is related in chemical structure to compounds such as benzylfentanyl and bezitramide, though it is sufficiently structurally distinct to fall outside the formal definition of a "fentanyl analogue" in jurisdictions such as the US and New Zealand which have Markush structure controls over this family of drugs. Despite its name, it is not a structural analog of morphine.

Brorphine was first identified in the U.S. recreational drug supply in July 2020 by the Center for Forensic Science Research and Education (CFSRE) through its NPS Discovery program; however, earlier identifications by the Drug Enforcement Administration (DEA) may have come as early as late 2019. The rise of brorphine in the U.S. can be directly linked to the decline of isotonitazene due to scheduling by the DEA. Brorphine was first implicated in 20 deaths in the U.S., primarily in cases originating from Midwest states. Brorphine was commonly found with fentanyl and flualprazolam, a drug combination verified by drug product testing. Brorphine has also been identified in counterfeit opioid pills and tablets. Recently data from CFSRE and NMS Labs show that brorphine has been detected in more than 100 cases as of October 2020.

== Legality ==
Brorphine is not controlled under the Single Convention on Narcotic Drugs, 1961, or under the Federal Analogue Act, but it could be illegal to sell, produce, possess or consume it in several countries if it is sold for human consumption. In the United States, brorphine was placed into temporary emergency Schedule I for 2 years by the DEA on January 4, 2021. On February 3, 2023, the DEA filed plans in the Federal Register for permanent placement of brorphine into Schedule I.

== See also ==
- AH-7921
- Bezitramide
- Cebranopadol
- Deekonda2016
- Diphenpipenol
- DPI-3290
- Etazen
- GSK1702934A
- J-113,397
- Oliceridine
- PZM21
- R6890
- SR-14968
- SR-16435
- SR-17018
- List of fentanyl analogues
- List of orphine opioids
