= AT-121 =

Chemical compound

Legal status
- Legal status: Investigational

Identifiers
- IUPAC name: 3-oxo-1'-(4-propan-2-ylcyclohexyl)-2-[2-(sulfamoylamino)ethyl]spiro[1H-isoquinoline-4,4'-piperidine]
- CAS Number: 2099681-31-7
- PubChem CID: 129188444
- ChemSpider: 114937398
- UNII: B3H9VJ92NG

Chemical and physical data
- Formula: C_{24}H_{38}N_{4}O_{3}S
- Molar mass: 462.65 g·mol^{−1}
- 3D model (JSmol): Interactive image
- SMILES: CC(C)[C@H]1CC[C@H](CC1)N1CCC2(CC1)C(=O)N(CCNS(N)(=O)=O)CC1=CC=CC=C21
- InChI: InChI=1S/C24H38N4O3S/c1-18(2)19-7-9-21(10-8-19)27-14-11-24(12-15-27)22-6-4-3-5-20(22)17-28(23(24)29)16-13-26-32(25,30)31/h3-6,18-19,21,26H,7-17H2,1-2H3,(H2,25,30,31); Key:LIZMNXKYQXVRSS-UHFFFAOYSA-N

AT-121 is an experimental analgesic. It was designed to be bifunctional, acting as an agonist at both the μ-opioid receptor and the nociceptin receptor. The interaction with the nociceptin receptor is expected to block the abuse and dependence-related side effects that are typical of opioids. A study in nonhuman primates found that AT-121 has morphine-like analgesic effects, but suppressed the addictive effects.

== See also ==
- AT-076
- Cebranopadol
- Oliceridine
- PZM21
