= SR-16435 =

Drug

Identifiers
- IUPAC name: 1-[1-(9-bicyclo[3.3.1]nonanyl)piperidin-4-yl]-3H-indol-2-one
- CAS Number: 857262-16-9
- PubChem CID: 11461888

Chemical and physical data
- Formula: C_{22}H_{30}N_{2}O
- Molar mass: 338.495 g·mol^{−1}
- 3D model (JSmol): Interactive image
- SMILES: C1CC2CCCC(C1)C2N3CCC(CC3)N4C(=O)CC5=CC=CC=C54
- InChI: InChI=1S/C22H30N2O/c25-21-15-18-5-1-2-10-20(18)24(21)19-11-13-23(14-12-19)22-16-6-3-7-17(22)9-4-8-16/h1-2,5,10,16-17,19,22H,3-4,6-9,11-15H2; Key:XVFXJQGBDPFCRF-UHFFFAOYSA-N

SR-16435 is a drug which acts as a potent partial agonist at both the μ-opioid receptor and nociceptin receptor. In animal studies it was found to be a potent analgesic, with results suggestive of reduced development of tolerance and increased activity against neuropathic pain compared to classic μ-selective agonists.

== See also ==
- Cebranopadol
- Brorphine
- J-113,397
- SR-14968
- SR-17018
