= KML-010 =

Chemical compound

Identifiers
- IUPAC name: 8-[4-(4-fluorophenyl)-4-oxobutyl]-1-methyl-1,3,8-triazaspiro[4.5]decan-4-one
- CAS Number: 217635-62-6
- PubChem CID: 10404584
- ChemSpider: 8580022
- UNII: V68MR69LDZ
- CompTox Dashboard (EPA): DTXSID001028491

Chemical and physical data
- Formula: C_{18}H_{24}FN_{3}O_{2}
- Molar mass: 333.407 g·mol^{−1}
- 3D model (JSmol): Interactive image
- SMILES: O=C1NCN(C)C1(CC2)CCN2CCCC(=O)c(cc3)ccc3F
- InChI: InChI=1S/C18H24FN3O2/c1-21-13-20-17(24)18(21)8-11-22(12-9-18)10-2-3-16(23)14-4-6-15(19)7-5-14/h4-7H,2-3,8-13H2,1H3,(H,20,24); Key:GRADLHIYNHRBCW-UHFFFAOYSA-N

KML-010 is a drug derived from spiperone. It functions as a highly selective 5-HT_{2A} receptor antagonist, with negligible affinity for the 5-HT_{1A} or 5-HT_{2C} receptors, and over 400-fold lower affinity for the D_{2} receptor in comparison to spiperone.

== See also ==
- Spiperone
