= SR-15099 =

Clinical data
- Other names: SR15099; SR-15; SR15; SR 2.0; 5,6-Dichlorodesmethylbrorphine; 5,6-Dichloro-desmethylbrorphine
- Drug class: μ-Opioid receptor partial agonist; μ-Opioid receptor positive allosteric modulator; Analgesic
- ATC code: None

Identifiers
- IUPAC name: 3-[1-[(4-bromophenyl)methyl]piperidin-4-yl]-5,6-dichloro-1H-benzimidazol-2-one
- PubChem CID: 130431412
- ChemSpider: 90666148
- ChEMBL: ChEMBL4217435

Chemical and physical data
- Formula: C_{19}H_{18}BrCl_{2}N_{3}O
- Molar mass: 455.18 g·mol^{−1}
- 3D model (JSmol): Interactive image
- SMILES: C1CN(CCC1N2C3=CC(=C(C=C3NC2=O)Cl)Cl)CC4=CC=C(C=C4)Br
- InChI: InChI=1S/C19H18BrCl2N3O/c20-13-3-1-12(2-4-13)11-24-7-5-14(6-8-24)25-18-10-16(22)15(21)9-17(18)23-19(25)26/h1-4,9-10,14H,5-8,11H2,(H,23,26); Key:MKPRNBUMJPGQCS-UHFFFAOYSA-N

SR-15099, also known as SR 2.0, is an atypical opioid and close analogue of SR-17018 and brorphine. It is the analogue of SR-17018 in which the chlorine atom on the benzyl ring has been replaced with a bromine atom. The drug is a non-competitive partial biased agonist of the μ-opioid receptor (MOR) similarly to SR-17018. It has similar effects in animals as SR-17018, such as having robust analgesic effects but producing minimal respiratory depression or hyperlocomotion. SR-15099 was first described in the scientific literature by Laura M. Bohn and colleagues by 2017. Like SR-17018 rather than being used recreationally itself, SR-15099 is typically employed by users to prevent opioid withdrawal symptoms and facilitate opioid discontinuation in the context of opioid dependence.

== See also ==
- List of orphine opioids
- μ-Opioid receptor § Biased agonists
