= HVD =

HVD may refer to:

- Half-value duration, a pharmacokinetic parameter
- High-voltage differential signaling, an electrical signalling method
- Hosted Virtual Desktop, a type of computer desktop virtualization
- High-Definition Versatile Disc, a DVD format
- Holographic Versatile Disc, an optical disc technology
- High-value detention site, a type of United States military prison
- Humanistischer Verband Deutschlands, a German humanist organization
- Khovd Airport, in Mongolia
