= C22H30N2O =

The molecular formula C_{22}H_{30}N_{2}O (molar mass: 338.50 g/mol) may refer to:

- Secofentanyl
- SR-16435
