= NNC 63-0532 =

Chemical compound

Clinical data
- Other names: NNC 63-0532

Identifiers
- IUPAC name: methyl [8-(1-naphthylmethyl)-4-oxo-1-phenyl-1,3,8-triazaspiro[4.5]dec-3-yl)acetate
- CAS Number: 250685-44-0
- PubChem CID: 9803475
- ChemSpider: 7979235
- UNII: 73663SY1DT
- CompTox Dashboard (EPA): DTXSID40397885

Chemical and physical data
- Formula: C_{27}H_{29}N_{3}O_{3}
- Molar mass: 443.547 g·mol^{−1}
- 3D model (JSmol): Interactive image
- SMILES: c3ccccc3N(CN(C2=O)CC(=O)OC)C2(CC4)CCN4Cc5c1ccccc1ccc5
- InChI: InChI=1S/C27H29N3O3/c1-33-25(31)19-29-20-30(23-11-3-2-4-12-23)27(26(29)32)14-16-28(17-15-27)18-22-10-7-9-21-8-5-6-13-24(21)22/h2-13H,14-20H2,1H3; Key:AQMPIDSGLFVVPL-UHFFFAOYSA-N

NNC 63-0532 is a nociceptoid drug used in scientific research. It acts as a potent and selective agonist for the nociceptin receptor, also known as the ORL-1 (opiate receptor-like 1) receptor.

The function of this receptor is not well understood, but it is believed to play a role in disorders like pain, drug addiction, opioid tolerance development, and psychological disorders such as anxiety and depression. Research into the function of this receptor is an important focus of current pharmaceutical development, and selective agents such as NNC 63-0532 are essential for this work.
