= SB-612,111 =

Chemical compound

Clinical data
- Other names: SB-612,111

Identifiers
- IUPAC name: (5S,7S)-7-{[4-(2,6-dichlorophenyl)piperidin-1-yl]methyl}-1-methyl-6,7,8,9-tetrahydro-5H-benzo[7]annulen-5-ol
- CAS Number: 371980-98-2
- PubChem CID: 10047612
- IUPHAR/BPS: 1693
- ChemSpider: 8223175
- ChEMBL: ChEMBL559569
- CompTox Dashboard (EPA): DTXSID301027159 DTXSID40610405, DTXSID301027159

Chemical and physical data
- Formula: C_{24}H_{29}Cl_{2}NO
- Molar mass: 418.40 g·mol^{−1}
- 3D model (JSmol): Interactive image; Interactive image
- SMILES: CC1=CC=CC2=C1CC[C@@H](C[C@@H]2O)CN3CCC(CC3)C4=C(C=CC=C4Cl)Cl; CC1=C2CC[C@@H](C[C@@H](C2=CC=C1)O)CN3CCC(CC3)C4=C(C=CC=C4Cl)Cl
- InChI: InChI=1S/C24H29Cl2NO/c1-16-4-2-5-20-19(16)9-8-17(14-23(20)28)15-27-12-10-18(11-13-27)24-21(25)6-3-7-22(24)26/h2-7,17-18,23,28H,8-15H2,1H3/t17-,23-/m0/s1; Key:OHRDCQFCAWLDBP-SBUREZEXSA-N

SB-612,111 is an opioid receptor ligand which is a potent and selective antagonist for the nociceptin receptor (ORL-1), several times more potent than the older drug J-113,397. It does not have analgesic effects in its own right, but prevents the development of hyperalgesia, and also shows antidepressant effects in animal studies.

== See also ==
- JTC-801
- J-113,397
- LY-2940094
