= R-4066 =

Chemical compound

Clinical data
- Other names: N-(3,3-diphenyl-4-oxohex-1-yl)-7,8-benzo-3-azaspiro[5.5]undecane

Identifiers
- IUPAC name: 6-{3,4-dihydro-2H-spiro[naphthalene-1,4'-piperidine]-1'-yl}-4,4-diphenylhexan-3-one
- CAS Number: 66194-36-3; oxalate: 101564-56-1
- PubChem CID: 380029
- ChemSpider: 336763
- UNII: L4YPY81SBM; oxalate: DL9M9L165Z
- ChEMBL: ChEMBL2010535
- CompTox Dashboard (EPA): DTXSID101018281 DTXSID10906347, DTXSID101018281

Chemical and physical data
- Formula: C_{32}H_{37}NO
- Molar mass: 451.654 g·mol^{−1}
- 3D model (JSmol): Interactive image
- SMILES: CCC(=O)C(CCN1CCC2(CCCC3=CC=CC=C32)CC1)(C4=CC=CC=C4)C5=CC=CC=C5
- InChI: InChI=1S/C32H37NO/c1-2-30(34)32(27-14-5-3-6-15-27,28-16-7-4-8-17-28)22-25-33-23-20-31(21-24-33)19-11-13-26-12-9-10-18-29(26)31/h3-10,12,14-18H,2,11,13,19-25H2,1H3; Key:ZVFXEHSJPKPKDW-UHFFFAOYSA-N

R-4066 (Spirodone) is a drug which is a derivative of the opioid analgesic norpipanone, wherein the piperidine ring has been replaced by a tricyclic spiro heterocycle. Developed by Janssen Pharmaceutica, it is around 212× more potent than methadone as an analgesic in animal tests, with an effective oral dosage of 0.07 mg/kg, but is shorter acting, with a duration of action of around 3 hours. If the ketone function is reduced and acetylated, the racemate has a potency of 106× that of methadone and has an analgesic duration of 20.5 hours compared to 8 hours for methadone.

R-4066 has not been researched in humans, but would be expected to produce effects similar to those of fentanyl, including strong analgesia, sedation, euphoria, constipation, itching and respiratory depression which could be harmful or fatal.

Other related compounds include R-4837 [59708-47-3] & R-5260 [1109-69-9].
