= BTRX-246040 =

Nociceptin receptor antagonist

Clinical data
- Other names: BTRX-246040
- Routes of administration: By mouth

Legal status
- Legal status: Investigational

Identifiers
- IUPAC name: [2-[4-[(2-chloro-4,4-difluoro-spiro[5H-thieno[2,3-c]pyran-7,4'-piperidine]-1'-yl)methyl]-3-methyl-pyrazol-1-yl]-3-pyridyl]methanol
- CAS Number: 1307245-86-8
- ChemSpider: 34248711
- UNII: 4I67US2V8Q
- ChEMBL: ChEMBL3304244
- CompTox Dashboard (EPA): DTXSID201336137

Chemical and physical data
- Formula: C_{22}H_{23}ClF_{2}N_{4}O_{2}S
- Molar mass: 480.96 g·mol^{−1}
- 3D model (JSmol): Interactive image
- SMILES: Cc1c(cn(n1)c2c(cccn2)CO)CN3CCC4(CC3)c5c(cc(s5)Cl)C(CO4)(F)F
- InChI: InChI=1S/C22H23ClF2N4O2S/c1-14-16(11-29(27-14)20-15(12-30)3-2-6-26-20)10-28-7-4-21(5-8-28)19-17(9-18(23)32-19)22(24,25)13-31-21/h2-3,6,9,11,30H,4-5,7-8,10,12-13H2,1H3; Key:NKQHBJNRBKHUQR-UHFFFAOYSA-N

BTRX-246040, also known as LY-2940094, is a potent and selective nociceptin receptor antagonist which is under development by BlackThorn Therapeutics and Eli Lilly for the treatment of major depressive disorder (MDD). It has demonstrated proof-of-concept clinical efficacy for depression. As of 2017, it is in phase II clinical trials for the treatment of MDD. It was also under investigation for the treatment of alcoholism, and similarly reached phase II clinical studies for this indication, but development was discontinued.

== See also ==
- List of investigational antidepressants
- J-113,397
- JTC-801
- SB-612,111
