= Fluetonitazepyne =

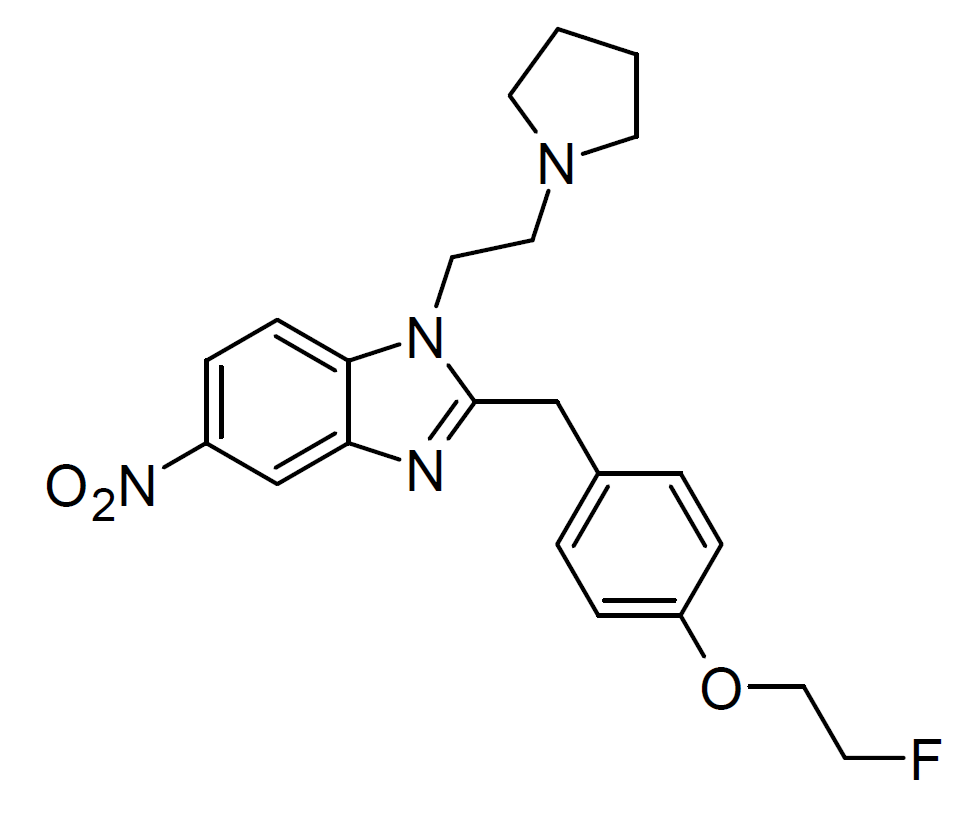

Identifiers
- IUPAC name: 2-[[4-(2-fluoroethoxy)phenyl]methyl]-5-nitro-1-(2-pyrrolidin-1-ylethyl)benzimidazole
- PubChem CID: 172871918

Chemical and physical data
- Formula: C_{22}H_{25}FN_{4}O_{3}
- Molar mass: 412.465 g·mol^{−1}
- 3D model (JSmol): Interactive image
- SMILES: C1CCN(C1)CCN2C3=C(C=C(C=C3)[N+](=O)[O-])N=C2CC4=CC=C(C=C4)OCCF
- InChI: InChI=1S/C22H25FN4O3/c23-9-14-30-19-6-3-17(4-7-19)15-22-24-20-16-18(27(28)29)5-8-21(20)26(22)13-12-25-10-1-2-11-25/h3-8,16H,1-2,9-15H2; Key:TYLHUWCBBIQCEH-UHFFFAOYSA-N

Fluetonitazepyne (F-etonitazepyne, 2-fluoroetonitazepyne) is a benzimidazole derivative which is an opioid designer drug. It was first identified in Italy in July 2024, and subsequently isolated in Finland in early 2025 from the body fluids of five people who had died from opioid overdose. It has also been detected in Germany.

== See also ==
- Etonitazepyne
- Fluetonitazene
- List of benzimidazole opioids
