= R6372 =

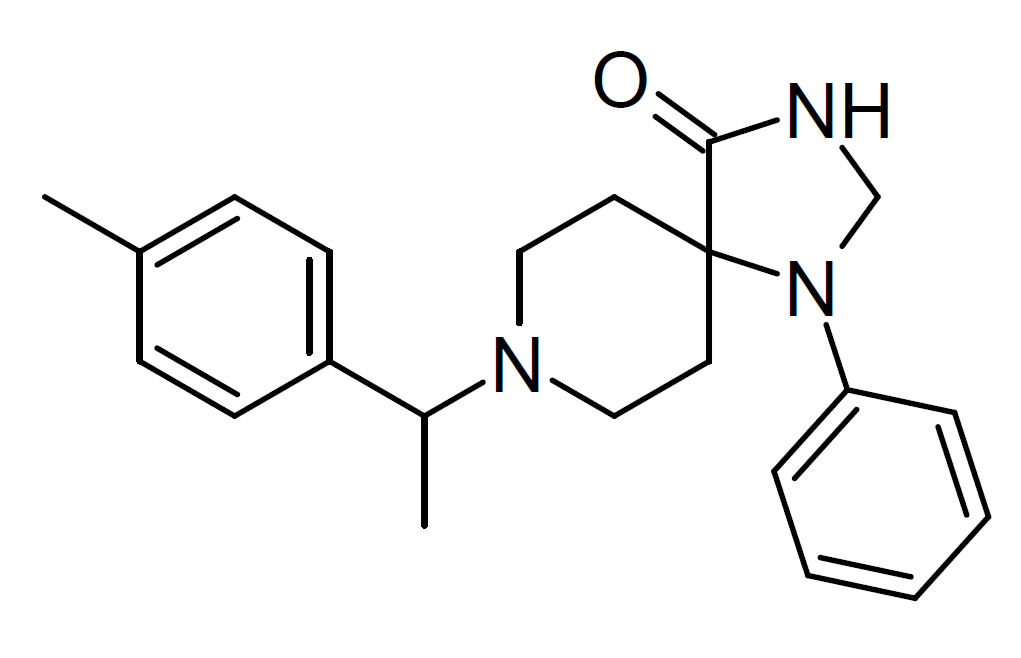

Identifiers
- IUPAC name: 8-[1-(4-methylphenyl)ethyl]-1-phenyl-1,3,8-triazaspiro[4.5]decan-4-one
- CAS Number: 2940-60-5
- PubChem CID: 200932
- ChemSpider: 173957

Chemical and physical data
- Formula: C_{22}H_{27}N_{3}O
- Molar mass: 349.478 g·mol^{−1}
- 3D model (JSmol): Interactive image
- SMILES: CC1=CC=C(C=C1)C(C)N2CCC3(CC2)C(=O)NCN3C4=CC=CC=C4
- InChI: InChI=1S/C22H27N3O/c1-17-8-10-19(11-9-17)18(2)24-14-12-22(13-15-24)21(26)23-16-25(22)20-6-4-3-5-7-20/h3-11,18H,12-16H2,1-2H3,(H,23,26); Key:MBCUBRXUURKNCY-UHFFFAOYSA-N

R6372 is a potent opioid analgesic drug from the spiropiperidine family, related to opioid designer drugs such as spirochlorphine. It has around 186x the potency of morphine, making it approximately twice the potency of fentanyl.

== See also ==
- Cychlorphine
- Spirobrorphine
- List of orphine opioids
