= Lexanopadol =

Clinical data
- Other names: GRT-6006; GRT6006; GRT-13106-G; GRT-13106G; GRT13106G
- Routes of administration: Oral
- Drug class: μ-Opioid receptor agonist; Nociceptin receptor agonist; Analgesic
- ATC code: None

Identifiers
- IUPAC name: 6-fluoro-N-methyl-1'-phenylspiro[4,9-dihydro-3H-pyrano[3,4-b]indole-1,4'-cyclohexane]-1'-amine
- CAS Number: 1357348-09-4
- PubChem CID: 24798598
- ChemSpider: 68007022
- UNII: DZ4NDW1LZX
- KEGG: D11760
- ChEMBL: ChEMBL3909973

Chemical and physical data
- Formula: C_{23}H_{25}FN_{2}O
- Molar mass: 364.464 g·mol^{−1}
- 3D model (JSmol): Interactive image
- SMILES: CNC1(CCC2(CC1)C3=C(CCO2)C4=C(N3)C=CC(=C4)F)C5=CC=CC=C5
- InChI: InChI=1S/C23H25FN2O/c1-25-22(16-5-3-2-4-6-16)10-12-23(13-11-22)21-18(9-14-27-23)19-15-17(24)7-8-20(19)26-21/h2-8,15,25-26H,9-14H2,1H3; Key:AMXGKMSRYLZAEO-UHFFFAOYSA-N

Lexanopadol (INN, USAN), also known by its developmental code name GRT-6006, is an opioid receptor modulator which was under development for the treatment of pain. It is taken orally. The drug acts as a dual agonist of the μ-opioid receptor and nociceptin receptor. It is thought that the combination of these activities may confer enhanced analgesic efficacy. Lexanopadol was under development by Grünenthal. It reached phase 1 or 2 clinical trials prior to the discontinuation of its development, with no further development reported by 2016. The drug was a follow-on compound to cebranopadol (GRT-6005).

== See also ==
- List of investigational analgesics
