= Fluetonitazene =

Identifiers
- IUPAC name: N,N-diethyl-2-[2-[[4-(2-fluoroethoxy)phenyl]methyl]-5-nitrobenzimidazol-1-yl]ethanamine
- PubChem CID: 172332078

Chemical and physical data
- Formula: C_{22}H_{27}FN_{4}O_{3}
- Molar mass: 414.481 g·mol^{−1}
- 3D model (JSmol): Interactive image
- SMILES: CCN(CC)CCN1C2=C(C=C(C=C2)[N+](=O)[O-])N=C1CC3=CC=C(C=C3)OCCF
- InChI: InChI=1S/C22H27FN4O3/c1-3-25(4-2)12-13-26-21-10-7-18(27(28)29)16-20(21)24-22(26)15-17-5-8-19(9-6-17)30-14-11-23/h5-10,16H,3-4,11-15H2,1-2H3; Key:XCWWXPKOMYPTRP-UHFFFAOYSA-N

Fluetonitazene (fluornitrazene, F-etonitazene, 2-fluoroetonitazene) is a benzimidazole derivative which is an opioid designer drug. It was patented in 2024 as a potential novel analgesic, but appeared on the illicit market at around the same time, first being identified in Germany in March 2024. It is a potent opioid agonist in vitro with similar potency to N-Desethyletonitazene.

== See also ==
- Fluetonitazepyne
- Isotonitazene
- Protonitazene
- N-Desethylfluornitrazene (DFNZ)
- List of benzimidazole opioids
