= JTC-801 =

Chemical compound

Clinical data
- Other names: JTC-801

Identifiers
- IUPAC name: N-(4-amino-2-methylquinolin-6-yl)-2-[(4-ethylphenoxy)methyl]benzamide
- CAS Number: 244218-51-7
- PubChem CID: 5311340
- IUPHAR/BPS: 1692
- ChemSpider: 4470841
- UNII: 7I21WLZ2FP
- CompTox Dashboard (EPA): DTXSID301158085

Chemical and physical data
- Formula: C_{26}H_{25}N_{3}O_{2}
- Molar mass: 411.505 g·mol^{−1}
- 3D model (JSmol): Interactive image
- SMILES: O=C(c1ccccc1COc2ccc(cc2)CC)Nc3ccc4nc(cc(c4c3)N)C
- InChI: InChI=1S/C26H25N3O2/c1-3-18-8-11-21(12-9-18)31-16-19-6-4-5-7-22(19)26(30)29-20-10-13-25-23(15-20)24(27)14-17(2)28-25/h4-15H,3,16H2,1-2H3,(H2,27,28)(H,29,30); Key:VTGBZWHPJFMTKS-UHFFFAOYSA-N

JTC-801 is an opioid analgesic drug used in scientific research.

JTC-801 is a selective antagonist for the nociceptin receptor, also known as the ORL-1 receptor. This was the fourth opioid receptor to be discovered and is still the least understood. The nociceptin receptor has complex effects which are involved in many processes involved in pain and inflammation responses, and activation of this receptor can either increase or reduce pain depending on dose. Drugs acting at the nociceptin receptor may influence the effects of traditional analgesics such as NSAIDs, μ-opioid agonists, and cannabinoids.

JTC-801 is an orally active drug that blocks the nociceptin receptor and produces analgesic effects in a variety of animal studies, and is particularly useful for neuropathic pain and allodynia associated with nerve injury.

== See also ==
- J-113,397
- LY-2940094
- SB-612,111
