= N-Desethylfluornitrazene =

Clinical data
- Other names: DFNZ; D-FNZ; N-Desethyl-fluornitrazene; N-Desethyl-2-fluoroetonitazene; N-Desethylfluetonitazene; N-Desethyl-fluetonitazene
- Drug class: Opioid analgesic; μ-Opioid receptor agonist
- ATC code: None

Identifiers
- IUPAC name: N-ethyl-2-[2-[[4-(2-fluoroethoxy)phenyl]methyl]-5-nitrobenzimidazol-1-yl]ethanamine

Chemical and physical data
- Formula: C_{20}H_{23}FN_{4}O_{3}
- Molar mass: 386.427 g·mol^{−1}
- 3D model (JSmol): Interactive image
- SMILES: CCNCCN(C(CC1=CC=C(OCCF)C=C1)=N2)C3=C2C=C([N+]([O-])=O)C=C3
- InChI: InChI=1S/C20H23FN4O3/c1-2-22-10-11-24-19-8-5-16(25(26)27)14-18(19)23-20(24)13-15-3-6-17(7-4-15)28-12-9-21/h3-8,14,22H,2,9-13H2,1H3; Key:LFDVGEZUWQGIGY-UHFFFAOYSA-N

N-Desethylfluornitrazene (DFNZ or D-FNZ) is an atypical opioid analgesic of the nitazene family related to etonitazene. It is the N-desethyl analogue of fluornitazene (FNZ). DFNZ is the major active metabolite of FNZ, which appears to act as a prodrug of DFNZ.

The drug is a highly selective superagonist of the μ-opioid receptor (MOR), with an affinity (K_{i}) of 1.0 nM, an EC_{50} of 1.66 to 8.49 nM, and an E_{max} of 104 to 119%. It shows some biased agonism at the MOR, preferring G protein to β-arrestin signaling. DFNZ shows a unique spatiotemporal pattern of MOR activation in vivo. It exhibits central permeability, but has impaired brain penetrance and thus some peripheral selectivity. The drug is a substrate of both P-glycoprotein and breast cancer resistance protein (BCRP), in contrast to FNZ, and this is responsible for its reduced capacity to cross the blood–brain barrier. Due to its peripheral selectivity, it shows limited MOR occupancy in the brain in rodents.

DFNZ produces strong analgesic effects in rodents. It also produces antiallodynic effects, induces hyperlocomotion, and substitutes for heroin, thereby reducing heroin self-administration. Conversely, the drug does not produce respiratory depression, does not cause brain hypoxia at analgesic doses, does not downregulate the MOR, produces little or no tolerance and withdrawal, and shows weak reinforcing effects in rodents. Relatedly, DFNZ shows diminished efficacy in activating the MOR–galanin receptor 1 (MOR–GAL_{1}) heteromer and has limited effects on dopaminergic signaling in the nucleus accumbens. Based on preclinical findings, the drug has low expected misuse liability in humans. It remains unclear the extent to which the analgesia of DFNZ is mediated by central versus peripheral MORs. However, it is known that the peripherally restricted MOR agonist loperamide shows only weak analgesic effects, in contrast to the strong analgesia of DFNZ. DFNZ is described as having an unusually strong and favorable safety profile for an opioid analgesic, let alone for a high-efficacy nitazene opioid.

DFNZ was first described in the scientific literature by 2026. It was developed by researchers at the National Institute on Drug Abuse (NIDA) and other institutions. There is interest in DFNZ for potential medical use as an analgesic in the treatment of pain and in opioid maintenance therapy. The drug may have advantages over conventional opioids such as improved safety. Sustained-release formulations may be required for some indications, like opioid substitution. DFNZ is a potential novel designer drug, but has not yet been encountered as one as of May 2026.

== See also ==
- Nitazenes
- List of benzimidazole opioids
- Fluornitazene (FNZ)
- N-Desethyletonitazene (NDE)
- SR-17018
