= MT-7716 =

Nociceptin receptor agonist

Names
- IUPAC name 2-[3-[1-[(1R)-1,2-Dihydroacenaphthylen-1-yl]piperidin-4-yl]-2-oxobenzimidazol-1-yl]-N-methylacetamide

Identifiers
CAS Number	610323-32-5 (free base); 1215859-92-9 (hydrochloride)
3D model (JSmol)	Interactive image
ChEMBL	ChEMBL2088035
ChemSpider	9639686
PubChem CID	11464846
UNII	37F97S18KQ
CompTox Dashboard (EPA)	DTXSID70466750
- InChI: InChI=1S/C27H28N4O2/c1-28-25(32)17-30-22-10-2-3-11-23(22)31(27(30)33)20-12-14-29(15-13-20)24-16-19-8-4-6-18-7-5-9-21(24)26(18)19/h2-11,20,24H,12-17H2,1H3,(H,28,32)/t24-/m1/s1 Key: PJANMOWVUZBDQF-XMMPIXPASA-N
- SMILES: CNC(=O)CN1C2=CC=CC=C2N(C1=O)C3CCN(CC3)[C@@H]4CC5=CC=CC6=C5C4=CC=C6

Properties
Chemical formula	C_{27}H_{28}N_{4}O_{2}
Molar mass	440.547 g·mol^{−1}
- Except where otherwise noted, data are given for materials in their standard state (at 25 °C [77 °F], 100 kPa). Infobox references

MT-7716 is an experimental opioid drug that could potentially be used in the treatment of alcohol addiction.

== Mechanism of action ==
Unlike most opioids, MT-7716 does not appear to act through delta, kappa and mu opioid receptors, but instead is an agonist of the nociceptin receptor.

== Alcohol addiction ==
A study has shown that MT-7716 was able to decrease alcohol self-administration and reduce alcohol withdrawal symptoms in rats.

Another study was also able to show similar results, in addition to demonstrating MT-7716's ability to suppress stress-induced alcohol seeking.
