= AT-076 =

Chemical compound

Identifiers
- IUPAC name: (3R)-7-hydroxy-N-[(2S)-1-[4-(3-hydroxyphenyl)piperidin-1-yl]-3-methylbutan-2-yl]-1,2,3,4-tetrahydroisoquinoline-3-carboxamide
- CAS Number: 1657028-64-2
- PubChem CID: 91938095
- ChemSpider: 58145111
- UNII: NT43S9BKJ2

Chemical and physical data
- Formula: C_{26}H_{35}N_{3}O_{3}
- Molar mass: 437.584 g·mol^{−1}
- 3D model (JSmol): Interactive image
- SMILES: CC(C)[C@@H](CN1CCC(CC1)C2=CC(=CC=C2)O)NC(=O)[C@H]3CC4=C(CN3)C=C(C=C4)O
- InChI: InChI=1S/C26H35N3O3/c1-17(2)25(16-29-10-8-18(9-11-29)19-4-3-5-22(30)12-19)28-26(32)24-14-20-6-7-23(31)13-21(20)15-27-24/h3-7,12-13,17-18,24-25,27,30-31H,8-11,14-16H2,1-2H3,(H,28,32)/t24-,25-/m1/s1; Key:LGYDWJJZDCXEOV-JWQCQUIFSA-N

AT-076 is a so-called opioid "pan" antagonist and is the first reasonably balanced antagonist known of all four opioid receptor types. It acts as an antagonist of all four types of opioid receptor, behaving as a competitive antagonist of the μ-opioid receptor (K_{i} = 1.67 nM) and δ-opioid receptor (K_{i} = 19.6 nM) and as a noncompetitive antagonist of the κ-opioid receptor (K_{i} = 1.14 nM) and nociceptin receptor (NOP, K_{i} = 1.75 nM). AT-076 was derived from the κ-opioid receptor antagonist JDTic, which showed affinity for NOP, by removal of two methyl groups from the piperidine ring. This increased affinity for NOP 10-fold relative to the parent compound.

== See also ==
- AT-121
- Cebranopadol
- Buprenorphine
- BU09059
