= Cychlorphine =

Synthetic opioid

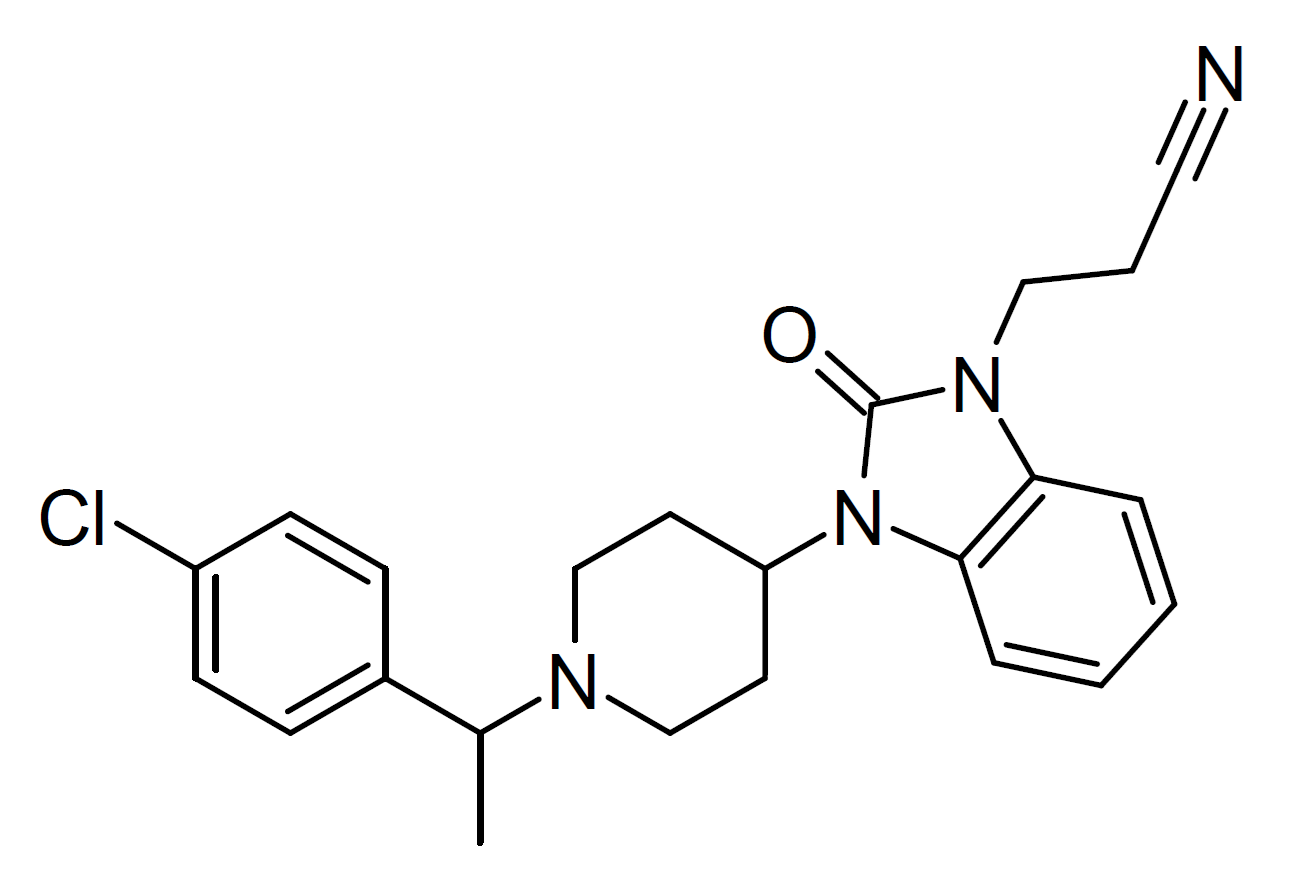

Clinical data
- Other names: N-Propionitrile chlorphine

Legal status
- Legal status: DE: NpSG (Industrial and scientific use only)

Identifiers
- IUPAC name: 3-[3-[1-[1-(4-chlorophenyl)ethyl]piperidin-4-yl]-2-oxobenzimidazol-1-yl]propanenitrile
- CAS Number: 6449-60-1
- PubChem CID: 201662
- ChemSpider: 174605
- ChEBI: CHEBI:761044
- ECHA InfoCard: 100.006.468

Chemical and physical data
- Formula: C_{23}H_{25}ClN_{4}O
- Molar mass: 408.93 g·mol^{−1}
- 3D model (JSmol): Interactive image
- SMILES: CC(C1=CC=C(C=C1)Cl)N2CCC(CC2)N3C4=CC=CC=C4N(C3=O)CCC#N
- InChI: InChI=1S/C23H25ClN4O/c1-17(18-7-9-19(24)10-8-18)26-15-11-20(12-16-26)28-22-6-3-2-5-21(22)27(23(28)29)14-4-13-25/h2-3,5-10,17,20H,4,11-12,14-16H2,1H3; Key:SWWAVNFEFVMDAG-UHFFFAOYSA-N

Cychlorphine is a synthetic opioid chemical compound sold as a designer drug which has been linked to hospitalizations and fatal overdoses in the United States, Europe and Canada. It is similar in chemical structure to known opioid agonists such as brorphine and spirochlorphine. It is suggested to be more potent than fentanyl. It is not a structural analog of morphine, despite the similar name. Instead, it is an orphine. Furthermore, it has been detected as the sole active component in fake pharmaceutical opioid preparations that are supposed to contain hydromorphone or oxycodone, further increasing the risk of accidental overdoses. In July 2026 the Danish health authority recommended using Naloxone as an immediate treatment.

== History ==
At least five people died from cychlorphine overdoses in England in 2025. Cyclorphine was first detected in Canada’s illicit drug supply in September 2025, after having been identified in U.S. samples in 2024. In Denmark, it has been found within various samples of confiscated drugs and in samples collected during an autopsy of a person who died of a drug overdose in July 2026.

It was added to the German new psychoactive substances act (NpSG) in December 2025.

According to Dr. Darinka Mileusnic-Polchan, a medical examiner working for the Knox and Anderson counties of Tennessee, there have been more than 50 fatal cychlorphine overdoses in the greater Knoxville area between October 2025 and May 2026.

Another death was reported in San Francisco, California, in April 2026. In September 2026 the mother of the overdose fatality went public with the New York Times. An earlier death in Los Angeles from February 2026 was later confirmed as being from cychlorphine.

Cychlorphine was connected to at least 122 deaths in the United States between July 2025 and late October 2026.

In July 2026, cychlorphine was detected by Welsh authorities in a Traditional Chinese Medicine product sold as Lion's Mane (Hericium erinaceus).

It was temporarily placed on the Schedule I list of the Controlled Substances Act in the US on 27 August 2026, and had also been recommended for scheduling in individual states such as Kentucky.

== See also ==
- Bezitramide
- N-Propionitrile brorphine
- List of orphine opioids
