= SR-17018 =

Atypical opioid drug

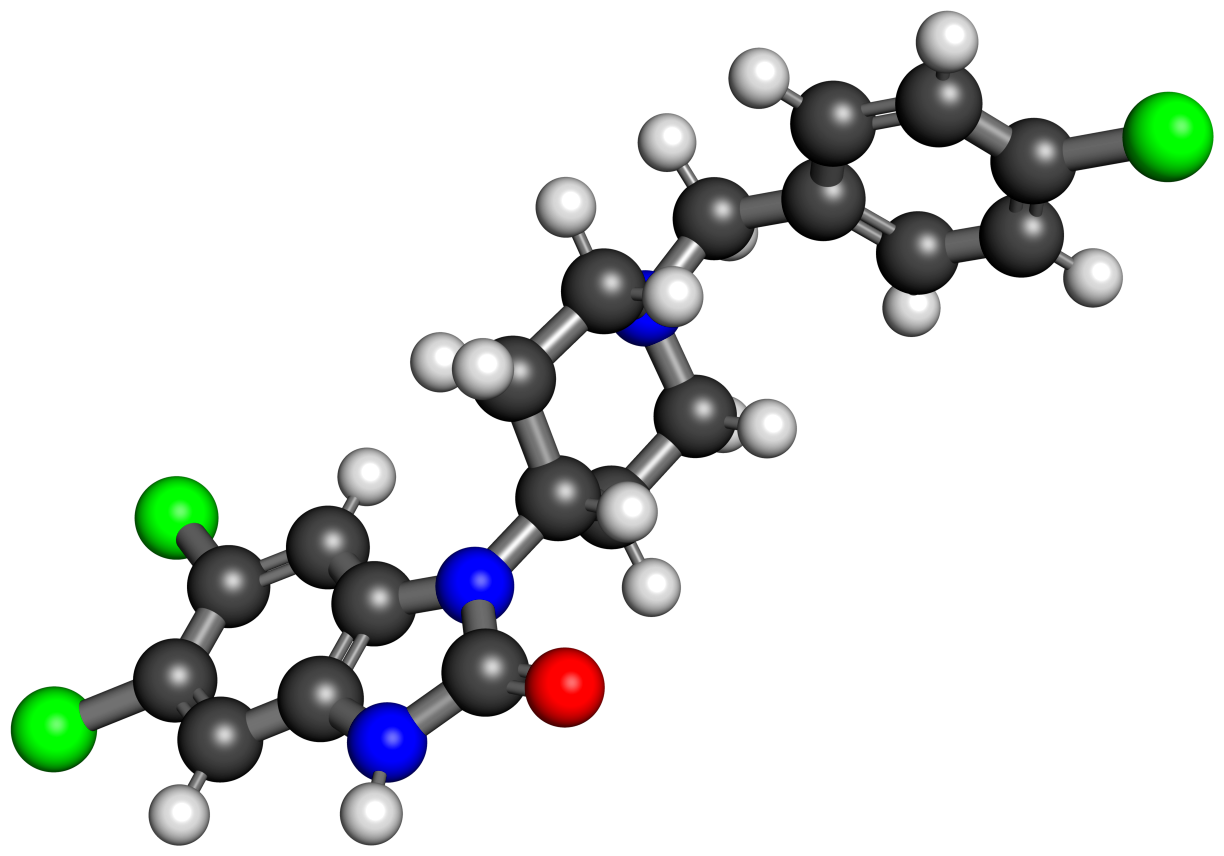

Clinical data
- Other names: SR17018; SR-17; SR17; SR; 5,6-Dichlorodesmethylchlorphine; 5,6-Dichloro-desmethylchlorphine
- Routes of administration: Oral
- Drug class: μ-Opioid receptor partial agonist; μ-Opioid receptor positive allosteric modulator; Analgesic

Legal status
- Legal status: US: Schedule I

Pharmacokinetic data
- Bioavailability: 69% (mice)
- Onset of action: 1–2 hours
- Elimination half-life: ~6 hours (mice)
- Duration of action: 4–8 hours

Identifiers
- IUPAC name: 5,6-dichloro-3-[1-[(4-chlorophenyl)methyl]piperidin-4-yl]-1H-benzimidazol-2-one
- CAS Number: 2134602-45-0
- PubChem CID: 130431397
- ChemSpider: 67886365
- UNII: 2M8P7UAW4W
- ChEMBL: ChEMBL4452384
- PDB ligand: WH9 (PDBe, RCSB PDB)
- CompTox Dashboard (EPA): DTXSID101336689

Chemical and physical data
- Formula: C_{19}H_{18}Cl_{3}N_{3}O
- Molar mass: 410.72 g·mol^{−1}
- 3D model (JSmol): Interactive image
- SMILES: C1CN(CCC1N2C3=CC(=C(C=C3NC2=O)Cl)Cl)CC4=CC=C(C=C4)Cl
- InChI: InChI=1S/C19H18Cl3N3O/c20-13-3-1-12(2-4-13)11-24-7-5-14(6-8-24)25-18-10-16(22)15(21)9-17(18)23-19(25)26/h1-4,9-10,14H,5-8,11H2,(H,23,26); Key:LAGUDYUGRSQDKS-UHFFFAOYSA-N

SR-17018, also known informally as SR-17 or just SR and as 5,6-dichloro-desmethylchlorphine, is an atypical opioid receptor modulator with unusual actions and effects. It acts as a biased partial agonist of the μ-opioid receptor (MOR), showing strong selectivity for activation of G protein signaling over β-arrestin2 recruitment at this receptor. In addition, the drug appears to also act as a MOR positive allosteric modulator, with this possibly being its primary action.

Unlike conventional opioids such as morphine and fentanyl, SR-17018 produces robust analgesic effects in rodents with very little respiratory depression and with much less analgesic tolerance. Moreover, substitution of conventional opioids like morphine with SR-17018 can reverse analgesic tolerance and suppress withdrawal symptoms in rodents. However, conflicting findings exist in terms of analgesic tolerance and respiratory depression. The drug has not been formally studied in humans.

SR-17018 was first described in the scientific literature by Laura Bohn and colleagues in 2017. It was encountered online as a novel designer drug by 2023. Subsequently, discussion of SR-17018 on the social media website Reddit dramatically increased in 2024. Although technically a designer opioid, SR-17018 is said to have very different effects from other opioids, for instance producing minimal euphoria. Rather than being used recreationally itself, SR-17018 is typically employed by users to prevent opioid withdrawal symptoms and facilitate opioid discontinuation in the context of opioid dependence. Nonetheless, in July 2026, the Drug Enforcement Administration (DEA) announced its intention to temporarily make SR-17018 a Schedule I controlled substance in the United States under emergency scheduling protocols, with this announcement receiving opposition.

== Pharmacology ==
=== Pharmacodynamics ===
SR-17018 acts as a biased partial agonist of the μ-opioid receptor (MOR), with strong selectivity for activation of G protein signaling over β-arrestin2 recruitment. Its affinities (K_{i}) for the human opioid receptors have been reported to be 11 nM for the MOR, 68 nM for the κ-opioid receptor (KOR), and >10,000 nM for the δ-opioid receptor (DOR). In terms of MOR activation, the drug had activational potencies and efficacies (EC_{50} and E_{max}) of 97–193 nM (72–75%) for GTPγS binding, 76 nM (105%) for cAMP accumulation, and >10,000 nM (10%) for β-arrestin2 recruitment. Both GTPγS binding and cAMP accumulation are measures of G protein signaling. The drug showed a calculated bias factor for GTPγS binding over β-arrestin2 recruitment of 80 to 100 relative to DAMGO. SR-17018 also showed strong bias for G protein activation over β-arrestin2 recruitment using mouse proteins, albeit with reduced efficacy for GTPγS binding (E_{max} = 37%). β-Arrestin2 activation may contribute to opioid tolerance, though it is not the only mechanism of tolerance to these drugs. SR-17018 shows a strikingly different MOR phosphorylation profile from other MOR biased, partial, and full agonists. Additional studies have characterized the interactions of SR-17018 with the MOR, including activational potencies and efficacies at downstream signaling pathways, as well.

SR-17018 has been found to act as a non-competitive MOR agonist with nearly irreversible binding to the receptor, resulting in persistent G protein signaling. However, MOR antagonists like naloxone can still fully reverse MOR stimulation by SR-17018 and hence SR-17018 is not an insurmountable MOR agonist. These findings suggest that SR-17018 interacts with an allosteric site on the MOR to facilitate G protein signaling whilst allowing the receptor to remain sensitive to antagonists at the orthosteric site. There is said to be strong evidence for SR-17018 interaction with a MOR allosteric site and its mechanism of MOR activation in vivo may be predominantly noncompetitive, but SR-17018 appears to interact with both this allosteric site and with the orthosteric site of the MOR. On the other hand, SR-17018 can antagonize certain morphine-induced effects in vivo, suggesting possible MOR competitive interaction.

SR-17018 produces potent and strong analgesic effects in rodents similarly to other MOR agonists like morphine and fentanyl. Conversely, the drug produces very little respiratory depression in rodents. It was estimated that the mouse therapeutic window, or quotient of respiratory depression and analgesia, was 26 to 105 for SR-17018, relative to 5 to 21 for morphine and 2 to 5 for fentanyl. This was based on median effective dose (ED_{50}) findings in oxygen saturation and breath rate assays divided by those in the hot plate and tail-flick tests. SR-17018 was subsequently assessed in rhesus monkeys and produced analgesic effects in this species that could be reversed by the MOR antagonist naltrexone, whereas respiratory depression could not be assessed due to solubility limitations. While conventional opioids like morphine produced robust itch-scratching behaviors, SR-17018 and buprenorphine only caused mild such effects, suggesting low-efficacy MOR activation. Although SR-17018 was reported to produce very little respiratory depression in mice, a subsequent study using oral administration instead of intraperitoneal administration, with the former having greater bioavailability, unexpectedly found significant respiratory depression with the drug.

SR-17018 produced less analgesic tolerance than other MOR agonists in mice. Whereas morphine and oxycodone produced robust tolerance in the hot plate test with chronic administration, SR-17018 produced no or only slight tolerance in this assay depending on the dosage. In addition, whereas morphine caused MOR desensitization in the periaqueductal gray (PAG), a key brain area implicated in the analgesic effects of MOR agonists, SR-17018 produced no desensitization. Similarly, unlike morphine, SR-17018 did not cause upregulation of forskolin-stimulated cAMP accumulation in striatal membranes. Despite the preceding findings however, discontinuation of both morphine and SR-17018 caused withdrawal symptoms in mice, though withdrawal symptoms were lower with SR-17018 compared to morphine. In addition, naloxone could precipitate withdrawal symptoms in SR-17018-treated mice, though these withdrawal symptoms were less intense than with other MOR agonists.

Chronic morphine administration causes cross-tolerance to analgesia with SR-17018 in mice and to the same magnitude as with morphine. This suggests that SR-17018 is accessing the same pool of MORs as morphine to produce its analgesic effects. Conversely, chronic SR-17018 administration did not produce cross-tolerance with morphine, which retained full analgesic sensitivity. This is consistent with SR-17018's lack of MOR desensitization. Surprisingly, chronic administration of morphine followed by replacement with chronic SR-17018 administration resulted in restoration of SR-17018's analgesic efficacy and full restoration of morphine's analgesic potency within a few days. Conversely, replacement with buprenorphine instead did not restore morphine's analgesic potency. These findings indicate that SR-17018 substitution can reverse morphine analgesic tolerance, whereas substitution with classical opioids like buprenorphine is unable to do this. The mechanism underlying this effect is unknown. Aside from effects on analgesic tolerance, both SR-17018 and buprenorphine suppressed morphine withdrawal symptoms. Similarly to SR-17018, the MOR positive allosteric modulator BMS-986122 has also been found to attenuate opioid analgesic tolerance in rodents.

While SR-17018 produced little to no analgesic tolerance in the hot plate test, subsequent research using other rodent pain models found that it did produce tolerance in the warm water tail immersion assay and to a similar degree as morphine and oxycodone. Moreover, both SR-17018 and morphine showed cross-tolerance with each other in this test. Both morphine and SR-17018 tolerance in the test could be partially reversed by a protein kinase C (PKC) inhibitor. Based on these findings, it was concluded that a single analgesic test may be inadequate for assessing a drug's analgesic tolerance. However, a later study found that SR-17018 produced analgesic tolerance, albeit slightly delayed, in the hot plate test as well. In addition to the preceding findings, whereas SR-17018 reversed morphine analgesic tolerance in the hot plate test, it did not do so in the tail flick assay. On the other hand, chronic SR-17018 administration maintained efficacy in the formalin paw-withdrawal assay and paclitaxel-induced neuropathic pain model, showing no tolerance in these tests, whereas morphine and oxycodone caused tolerance in these assays.

In a subsequent study to its initial in-vitro characterization, it was found that SR-17018 showed low activational efficacy across a selection of MOR signaling pathways, whereas classical opioids like morphine, fentanyl, methadone, and oxycodone showed higher efficacy. It was proposed by the researchers that low maximal receptor activation, or lower-efficacy partial agonism, could explain the atypical effects of biased MOR agonists like SR-17018 rather than biased agonism. These results were subsequently reanalyzed and disputed by other researchers. In any case, the exact mechanisms underlying the atypical effects of SR-17018 remain unclear. For example, they may be related to G protein over β-arrestin2 bias, or to differences in G protein-mediated signaling.

SR-17018 produces rewarding effects as assessed by conditioned place preference (CPP) in rodents. Its rewarding effects in this assay were comparable to those of morphine. In addition to rewarding effects, SR-17018 produces modest hyperlocomotion in rodents, albeit to a far lesser extent than morphine or fentanyl. Addition of SR-17018 to morphine in rodents attenuates morphine-induced hyperlocomotion whilst increasing analgesic efficacy in mice. Unlike morphine and fentanyl, SR-17018 does not produce locomotor sensitization with chronic administration. A self-administration study of SR-17018 in mice was limited by the drug's poor solubility. However, in a subsequent study, the drug produced self-administration in mice, but was less efficacious than oxycodone or fentanyl. SR-17018 has also been found to produce self-administration in rhesus monkeys, but along with buprenorphine, was less efficacious than heroin in this test.

=== Pharmacokinetics ===
The pharmacokinetics of SR-17018 in rodents have been studied. In mice, it is orally active, showing 69% bioavailability, has an elimination half-life of approximately 6 hours, and efficiently crosses the blood–brain barrier into the central nervous system. The drug has greatly improved bioavailability orally compared to intraperitoneally in mice. Its half-life in mice is longer than that of morphine or oxycodone. Similarly, its duration is longer than that of morphine or fentanyl in mice.

== Chemistry ==
SR-17018 is variously described as a piperidinylbenzimidazolone, piperidine–benzimidazole, or N-benzyl piperidine 4-benzimidazolone derivative. It is structurally related to designer opioids such as brorphine.

=== Properties ===
SR-17018 is highly lipophilic, with a log P of 4.75 (relative to 0.90 for morphine), and has very poor water solubility.

=== Synthesis ===
The chemical synthesis of SR-17018 has been described.

=== Analogues ===
Analogues of SR-17018, which is also known as 5,6-dichlorodesmethylchlorphine, include brorphine, chlorphine, SR-14968 (5,6-dichlorobrorphine), SR-14969, SR-15098, SR-15099 (SR 2.0), SR-16435, Muzepan1, and Muzepan2, among others.

== History ==
SR-17018 was patented in 2016 and first described in the scientific literature by Laura Bohn and colleagues at the Scripps Research Institute in Jupiter, Florida in 2017. The drug was encountered as a novel designer drug online by 2023. Analogues like brorphine and SR-14968 have also been encountered as novel designer drugs. Brorphine is said to not be popular among recreational users as it produces little euphoria but reportedly still has potential for severe respiratory depression. In 2024, discussion of SR-17018 on the social media website Reddit suddenly dramatically increased and the drug emerged as an informal treatment for opioid discontinuation and withdrawal.

On July 1, 2026, the United States Drug Enforcement Administration (DEA) signed a letter of intent to temporarily place SR-17018 under Schedule I of the Controlled Substances Act. This will likely take effect on July 31, 2026. There has been opposition to the announcement, for instance by the Students for Sensible Drug Policy (SSDP).

== Society and culture ==
=== Non-clinical use ===
SR-17018 has emerged as a novel designer drug and has been extensively discussed online, for instance on the social media website Reddit. Thorough online documentation of the drug, for instance use protocols and experiences, have emerged. The drug is anecdotally reported to have very different effects relative to other opioids. Rather than being used to produce euphoria, SR-17018 is employed to help dependent individuals discontinue opioids, to prevent opioid withdrawal, and to reduce opioid tolerance. It has been used to facilitate discontinuation of a wide range of opioids, including fentanyl, heroin, methadone, buprenorphine, prescription opioids, synthetic opioids like nitazenes, and kratom, among others. SR-17018 itself is said to produce minimal euphoria or analgesia, in contrast to conventional opioids. A risk of SR-17018 is accidental overdose of opioids after tolerance has reduced, with at least one fatal case having been reported. It is not said to address psychological opioid addiction.

=== Legal status ===
==== Germany ====
SR-17018 became a prohibited substance in Germany under the Neue-psychoaktive-Stoffe-Gesetz (NpSG) in late 2025.

==== Russia ====
SR-17018 is not a controlled substance in Russia nor in Belarus as of 2023.

==== United States ====
As of July 2026, the United States Drug Enforcement Administration (DEA) intends to temporarily classify SR-17018 as a Schedule I controlled substance.

== Research ==
G protein-biased MOR agonists like SR-17018 have potential medical applications as analgesics in the treatment of pain and as opioid substitutes in the treatment of opioid dependence and withdrawal. However, it remains unclear whether G protein-biased MOR agonists, such as SR-17018 and oliceridine, are truly clinically advantageous to conventional MOR agonists. SR-17018 has only been assessed in preclinical research and has not been formally studied in humans. Improved analogues of SR-17018 are being studied by Laura Bohn and colleagues as of December 2025.

== See also ==
- List of orphine opioids
- μ-Opioid receptor § Biased agonists
- N-Desethylfluornitrazene (DFNZ)
- Methocinnamox
