= THQ-PINACA =

Chemical compound

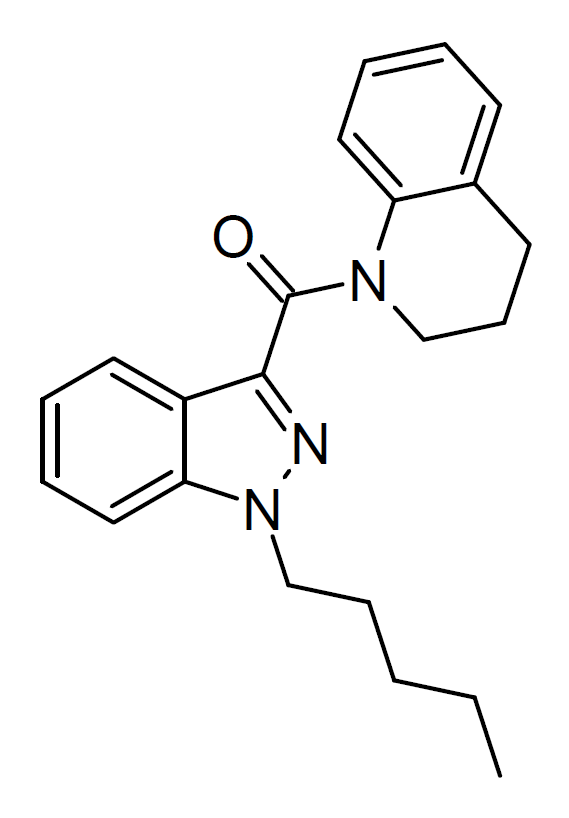

Identifiers
- IUPAC name: 3,4-dihydro-2H-quinolin-1-yl-(1-pentylindazol-3-yl)methanone
- CAS Number: 2950480-11-0
- PubChem CID: 165361626
- ChemSpider: 97091816
- UNII: 090DE9CRP1

Chemical and physical data
- Formula: C_{22}H_{25}N_{3}O
- Molar mass: 347.462 g·mol^{−1}
- 3D model (JSmol): Interactive image
- SMILES: CCCCCN1C2=CC=CC=C2C(=N1)C(=O)N3CCCC4=CC=CC=C43
- InChI: InChI=1S/C22H25N3O/c1-2-3-8-16-25-20-14-7-5-12-18(20)21(23-25)22(26)24-15-9-11-17-10-4-6-13-19(17)24/h4-7,10,12-14H,2-3,8-9,11,15-16H2,1H3; Key:BHNGHAHGIHEHPX-UHFFFAOYSA-N

THQ-PINACA (SGT-88) is a synthetic cannabinoid compound which has been sold as a designer drug, first identified in Slovenia in 2021.

== See also ==
- JWH-018
- Org 28611
- PB-22
- THJ-018
