= N-Methylspiperone =

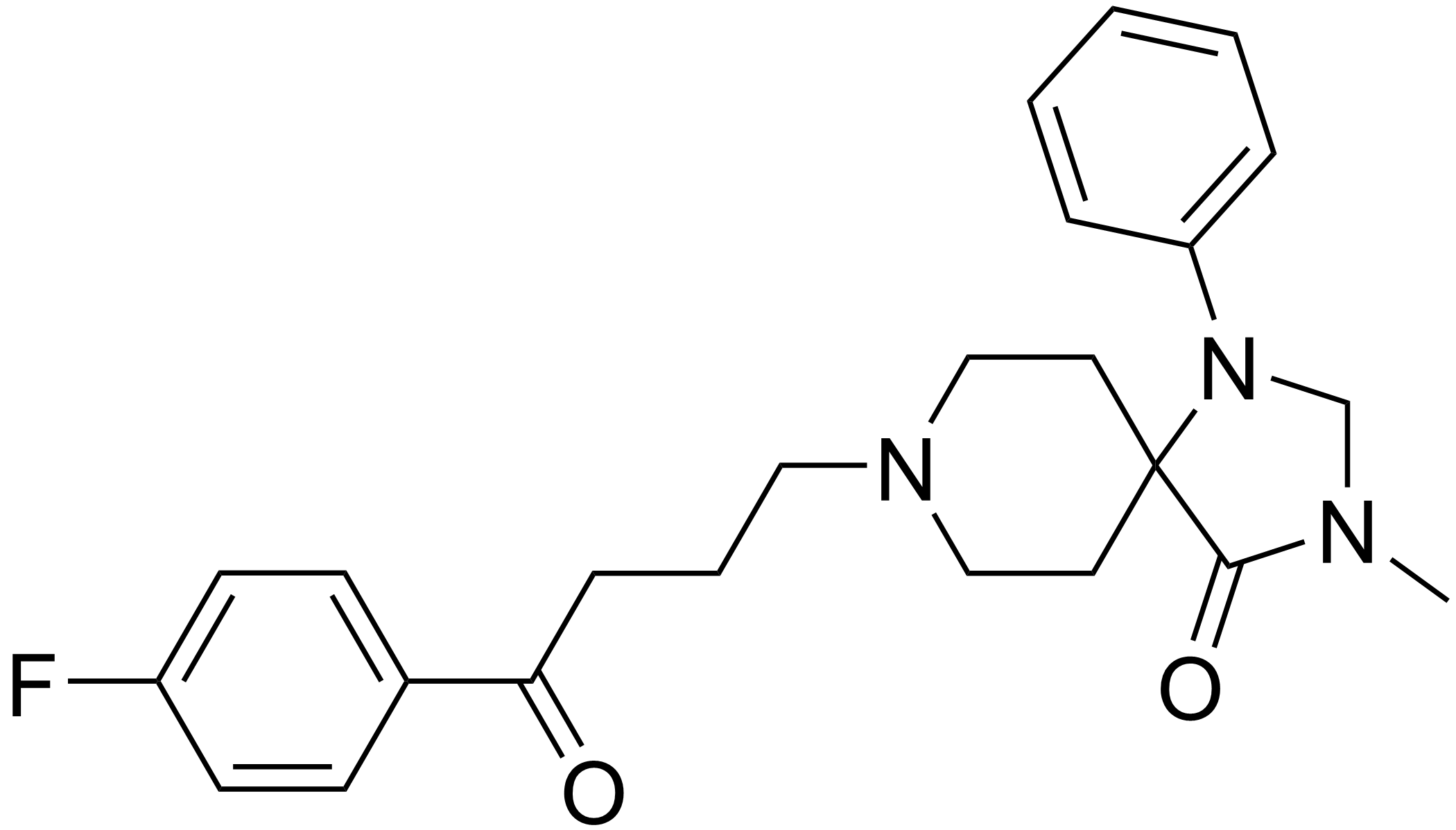

Names
- IUPAC name 8-[4-(4-fluorophenyl)-4-oxobutyl]-3-methyl-1-phenyl-1,3,8-triazaspiro[4.5]decan-4-one
- Other names 3-N-Methylspiperone

Identifiers
CAS Number	87539-19-3
3D model (JSmol)	Interactive image
ChemSpider	106447
IUPHAR/BPS	196
PubChem CID	119146
UNII	5U54JM2T8G
CompTox Dashboard (EPA)	DTXSID70236379
- InChI: InChI=1S/C24H28FN3O2/c1-26-18-28(21-6-3-2-4-7-21)24(23(26)30)13-16-27(17-14-24)15-5-8-22(29)19-9-11-20(25)12-10-19/h2-4,6-7,9-12H,5,8,13-18H2,1H3 Key: QHJLPOSPWKZACG-UHFFFAOYSA-N; InChI=1/C24H28FN3O2/c1-26-18-28(21-6-3-2-4-7-21)24(23(26)30)13-16-27(17-14-24)15-5-8-22(29)19-9-11-20(25)12-10-19/h2-4,6-7,9-12H,5,8,13-18H2,1H3 Key: QHJLPOSPWKZACG-UHFFFAOYAB
- SMILES: CN1CN(C2(C1=O)CCN(CC2)CCCC(=O)C3=CC=C(C=C3)F)C4=CC=CC=C4

Properties
Chemical formula	C_{24}H_{28}FN_{3}O_{2}
Molar mass	409.505 g·mol^{−1}
- Except where otherwise noted, data are given for materials in their standard state (at 25 °C [77 °F], 100 kPa). verify (what is ?) Infobox references

N-Methylspiperone (NMSP) is a derivate of spiperone that is used to study the dopamine and serotonin neurotransmitter systems. Labeled with the radioisotope carbon-11, it can be used for positron emission tomography.
