= Spiramide =

Chemical compound

Clinical data
- ATC code: none

Identifiers
- IUPAC name: 8-[3-(4-Fluorophenoxy)propyl]-1-phenyl-1,3,8-triazaspiro[4,5]decan-4-one
- CAS Number: 510-74-7
- PubChem CID: 68186
- IUPHAR/BPS: 175
- ChemSpider: 61493
- UNII: 471LF4O004
- ChEBI: CHEBI:64207
- CompTox Dashboard (EPA): DTXSID6042579

Chemical and physical data
- Formula: C_{22}H_{27}FN_{3}O_{2}
- Molar mass: 384.475 g·mol^{−1}
- 3D model (JSmol): Interactive image
- SMILES: c2cc(F)ccc2OCCCN3CCC1(CC3)N(CNC1=O)c4ccccc4
- InChI: InChI=1S/C22H26FN3O2/c23-18-7-9-20(10-8-18)28-16-4-13-25-14-11-22(12-15-25)21(27)24-17-26(22)19-5-2-1-3-6-19/h1-3,5-10H,4,11-17H2,(H,24,27); Key:FJUKDAZEABGEIH-UHFFFAOYSA-N

Spiramide (developmental code name AMI-193) is an experimental antipsychotic that acts as a selective 5-HT_{2A}, 5-HT_{1A}, and D_{2} receptor antagonist. It has negligible affinity for the 5-HT_{2C} receptor.

== See also ==
- Spirodecanone
