= SR-14968 =

Chemical compound

Clinical data
- Other names: SR14968; 5,6-Dichlorobrorphine
- Drug class: μ-Opioid receptor biased agonist; Analgesic

Identifiers
- IUPAC name: 3-[1-[1-(4-bromophenyl)ethyl]piperidin-4-yl]-5,6-dichloro-1H-benzimidazol-2-one
- CAS Number: 2133455-40-8
- PubChem CID: 130431386
- ChemSpider: 95781537

Chemical and physical data
- Formula: C_{20}H_{20}BrCl_{2}N_{3}O
- Molar mass: 469.20 g·mol^{−1}
- 3D model (JSmol): Interactive image
- SMILES: CC(C1=CC=C(C=C1)Br)N2CCC(CC2)N3C4=CC(=C(C=C4NC3=O)Cl)Cl
- InChI: InChI=1S/C20H20BrCl2N3O/c1-12(13-2-4-14(21)5-3-13)25-8-6-15(7-9-25)26-19-11-17(23)16(22)10-18(19)24-20(26)27/h2-5,10-12,15H,6-9H2,1H3,(H,24,27); Key:DJSSLECNUQMYKG-UHFFFAOYSA-N

SR-14968 is a drug which acts as a biased agonist at the μ-opioid receptor, selective for activation of the G-protein signalling pathway over β-arrestin 2 recruitment. It is closely related to other compounds such as SR-17018 although it is more potent and is a fully efficacious agonist. SR-14968 shows robust biased agonist activity in vitro, but in animal studies in vivo behaves more like a typical opioid agonist and will still produce respiratory suppression at higher doses although it has a wider safety profile compared to fentanyl. Compounds of this class are under development as potential analgesic medications with lower risk of overdose and drug dependence compared to traditional opioid drugs. SR-14968 was encountered online as a novel designer drug in 2025. It was proposed by the DEA to be placed on the Schedule 1 list in the USA on 1 July 2026.

== See also ==
- List of orphine opioids
- SR-16435
