= Spiroxatrine =

Names
- IUPAC name 8-(2,3-Dihydro-1,4-benzodioxin-2-ylmethyl)-1-phenyl-1,3,8-triazaspiro[4.5]decan-4-one

Identifiers
CAS Number	1054-88-2
3D model (JSmol)	Interactive image
ChEMBL	ChEMBL300555
ChemSpider	5078
IUPHAR/BPS	53
MeSH	Spiroxatrine
PubChem CID	5268
UNII	DR0QR50ALL
CompTox Dashboard (EPA)	DTXSID3045198
- InChI: InChI=1S/C22H25N3O3/c26-21-22(25(16-23-21)17-6-2-1-3-7-17)10-12-24(13-11-22)14-18-15-27-19-8-4-5-9-20(19)28-18/h1-9,18H,10-16H2,(H,23,26) Key: JVGBTTIJPBFLTE-UHFFFAOYSA-N
- SMILES: O=C2NCN(c1ccccc1)C23CCN(CC3)CC4Oc5ccccc5OC4

Properties
Chemical formula	C_{22}H_{25}N_{3}O_{3}
Molar mass	379.460 g·mol^{−1}
- Except where otherwise noted, data are given for materials in their standard state (at 25 °C [77 °F], 100 kPa). verify (what is ?) Infobox references

Spiroxatrine (Spiroxamide, R5188) is a drug which acts as a selective antagonist at both the 5-HT_{1A} receptor and the α_{2C} adrenergic receptor. It is an analog of spiperone and also has some dopamine antagonist effects and a relatively weak opioid action.
