= Bezitramide =

Opioid analgesic drug

Clinical data
- Routes of administration: Oral
- ATC code: N02AC05 (WHO)

Legal status
- Legal status: BR: Class A1 (Narcotic drugs); CA: Schedule I; DE: Anlage I (Authorized scientific use only); US: Schedule II

Identifiers
- IUPAC name: 4-[4-(2-oxo-3-propanoyl-2,3-dihydro-1H-benzimidazol-1-yl)piperidin-1-yl]-2,2-diphenylbutanenitrile
- CAS Number: 15301-48-1
- PubChem CID: 61791
- DrugBank: DB01459
- ChemSpider: 55675
- UNII: 3KXW0Y310I
- KEGG: D07289
- ChEMBL: ChEMBL2104149
- CompTox Dashboard (EPA): DTXSID90165197
- ECHA InfoCard: 100.035.744

Chemical and physical data
- Formula: C_{31}H_{32}N_{4}O_{2}
- Molar mass: 492.623 g·mol^{−1}
- 3D model (JSmol): Interactive image
- SMILES: O=C(N2c1ccccc1N(C2=O)C5CCN(CCC(C#N)(c3ccccc3)c4ccccc4)CC5)CC
- InChI: InChI=1S/C31H32N4O2/c1-2-29(36)35-28-16-10-9-15-27(28)34(30(35)37)26-17-20-33(21-18-26)22-19-31(23-32,24-11-5-3-6-12-24)25-13-7-4-8-14-25/h3-16,26H,2,17-22H2,1H3; Key:FLKWNFFCSSJANB-UHFFFAOYSA-N

Bezitramide is an opioid analgesic. Bezitramide itself is a prodrug which is readily hydrolyzed in the gastrointestinal tract to its active metabolite, despropionyl-bezitramide. Bezitramide was discovered at Janssen Pharmaceutica in 1961. It is most commonly marketed under the trade name Burgodin.

The drug was pulled from the shelves in the Netherlands in 2004 after fatal overdose cases, including one where a five-year-old child took one tablet from his mother's purse, ate it, and promptly died.

Bezitramide is regulated much the same as morphine in all known jurisdictions and is a Schedule II substance under the United States' Controlled Substances Act of 1970, with an ACSCN of 9800 and zero annual manufacturing quota. However, as of May 2021, it has never been marketed in the United States.

== See also ==
- Benperidol
- Brorphine
- Cychlorphine
- J-113,397
