= Half-value duration =

Half-value duration (HVD or HaVD), also known as T50%Cmax, is a pharmacokinetic parameter defined as the time for circulating concentrations to decline to 50% of the peak or maximal concentration (C_{max}). It was introduced by J. Meier and colleagues in 1974 for description of modified-release drug formulations. Related metrics include T75%Cmax and T25%Cmax, among others.

== See also ==
- Elimination (pharmacology)
- Biological half-life
- Residence time
