= Ro65-6570 =

Nociceptin receptor agonist

Identifiers
- IUPAC name: 8-(1,2-dihydroacenaphthylen-1-yl)-1-phenyl-1,3,8-triazaspiro[4.5]decan-4-one
- CAS Number: 228246-56-8
- PubChem CID: 10022859
- IUPHAR/BPS: 8864
- ChEMBL: ChEMBL281274

Chemical and physical data
- Formula: C_{25}H_{25}N_{3}O
- Molar mass: 383.495 g·mol^{−1}
- 3D model (JSmol): Interactive image
- SMILES: C1CN(CCC12C(=O)NCN2C3=CC=CC=C3)C4CC5=CC=CC6=C5C4=CC=C6
- InChI: InChI=InChI=1S/C25H25N3O/c29-24-25(28(17-26-24)20-9-2-1-3-10-20)12-14-27(15-13-25)22-16-19-8-4-6-18-7-5-11-21(22)23(18)19/h1-11,22H,12-17H2,(H,26,29); Key:BBOAHBVXCYBKLC-UHFFFAOYSA-N

Ro65-6570 is an opioid drug. It has a potential use in preventing the addiction to other opioids.

== Mechanism of action ==
Ro65-6570 is an opioid drug, it works by activating opioid receptors. However, instead of acting at the mu, kappa and delta receptors, it is instead an agonist at the nociceptin receptor.

== Potential uses ==
=== Analgesic ===
Ro65-6570 has analgesic properties. In rats, it is able to reduce cancer pain. It is also able to reduce pain caused by arthritis.

=== Prevention of opioid addiction ===
While being an opioid agonist, Ro65-6570 did not display addictive properties, it instead reduced the addictive properties of other opioids, but did not affect the analgesic effect of those. This could make it useful if combined with more potent opioids, for example oxycodone and Ro65-6570 would reduce pain, but would be less addictive, unlike oxycodone alone. This effect was antagonized by the nociceptin receptor antagonist J-113,397, further suggesting that this action is linked to the NOP receptor.
