= Ro64-6198 =

Chemical compound

Clinical data
- Other names: Ro64-6198

Identifiers
- IUPAC name: 8-[(1S,3aS)-2,3,3a,4,5,6-hexahydro-1H-phenalen-1-yl]-1-phenyl-1,3,8-triazaspiro[4.5]decan-4-one
- CAS Number: 280783-56-4
- PubChem CID: 9844019
- IUPHAR/BPS: 1684
- ChemSpider: 8019734
- UNII: HKN6H9XXS6
- ChEMBL: ChEMBL2088034
- CompTox Dashboard (EPA): DTXSID901018435

Chemical and physical data
- Formula: C_{26}H_{31}N_{3}O
- Molar mass: 401.554 g·mol^{−1}
- 3D model (JSmol): Interactive image
- SMILES: C1C[C@H]2CC[C@@H](C3=CC=CC(=C23)C1)N4CCC5(CC4)C(=O)NCN5C6=CC=CC=C6
- InChI: InChI=1S/C26H31N3O/c30-25-26(29(18-27-25)21-9-2-1-3-10-21)14-16-28(17-15-26)23-13-12-20-7-4-6-19-8-5-11-22(23)24(19)20/h1-3,5,8-11,20,23H,4,6-7,12-18H2,(H,27,30)/t20-,23-/m0/s1; Key:JLFMYEAXZNPWBK-REWPJTCUSA-N

Ro64-6198 is an opioid drug used in scientific research. It acts as a potent and selective agonist for the nociceptin receptor, also known as the ORL-1 (opiate receptor like-1) receptor, with over 100x selectivity over the other opioid receptors. It produces anxiolytic effects in animal studies equivalent to those of benzodiazepine drugs, but has no anticonvulsant effects and does not produce any overt effects on behaviour. However it does impair short-term memory, and counteracts stress-induced anorexia. It also has antitussive effects, and reduces the rewarding and analgesic effects of morphine, although it did not prevent the development of dependence. It has been shown to reduce alcohol self-administration in animals and suppressed relapses in animal models of alcoholism, and ORL-1 agonists may have application in the treatment of alcoholism.

Ro64-6198 was able to be recognised as a discriminative stimulus by rats distinct from other opioid receptor ligands, but was not able to produce the conditioned place preference thought to be indicative of addictive potential. Consequently, while the role of ORL-1 receptors in the body is complex and remains poorly understood, Ro64-6198 has demonstrated multiple pharmacological actions and has been very useful in the study of the ORL-1 receptor system, especially in relation to anxiety and anorexia; however, due to poor oral bioavailability, Ro 64-6198 will most likely not be pursued clinically. Studies in primates showed it to have analgesic effects but without producing respiratory depression or reinforcing effects.
