= Cebranopadol =

Opioid analgesic drug

Clinical data
- Other names: GRT-6005; GRT6005; PRK-101; PRK101; TRN-228; TRN228
- Routes of administration: Oral
- Drug class: Non-selective opioid receptor agonist; μ-Opioid receptor agonist; Nociceptin receptor agonist; κ-Opioid receptor agonist; Opioid analgesic

Legal status
- Legal status: Uncontrolled

Pharmacokinetic data
- Bioavailability: 40%
- Onset of action: 4–6 hours (T_{max})
- Elimination half-life: 62–96 hours

Identifiers
- IUPAC name: 6-fluoro-N,N-dimethyl-1'-phenylspiro[4,9-dihydro-3H-pyrano[3,4-b]indole-1,4'-cyclohexane]-1'-amine
- CAS Number: 863513-91-1
- PubChem CID: 11848225
- DrugBank: DB12830
- ChemSpider: 29398942
- UNII: 7GDW9S3GN3
- KEGG: D10436
- ChEBI: CHEBI:231222
- ChEMBL: ChEMBL2364605

Chemical and physical data
- Formula: C_{24}H_{27}FN_{2}O
- Molar mass: 378.491 g·mol^{−1}
- 3D model (JSmol): Interactive image
- SMILES: CN(C)C1(CCC2(CC1)C3=C(CCO2)C4=C(N3)C=CC(=C4)F)C5=CC=CC=C5
- InChI: InChI=1S/C24H27FN2O/c1-27(2)23(17-6-4-3-5-7-17)11-13-24(14-12-23)22-19(10-15-28-24)20-16-18(25)8-9-21(20)26-22/h3-9,16,26H,10-15H2,1-2H3; Key:CSMVOZKEWSOFER-UHFFFAOYSA-N

Cebranopadol, also known by its developmental code names TRN-228 and formerly GRT-6005, is an experimental atypical opioid analgesic which is under development for the treatment of various types of pain as well as for treatment of substance-related disorders. It is taken orally.

Side effects of cebranopadol include nausea, vomiting, constipation, somnolence, euphoria, and respiratory depression, among others. The drug acts as a non-selective opioid receptor agonist, including as a dual μ-opioid receptor and nociceptin receptor full agonist and to a lesser extent as a κ-opioid receptor partial agonist. In relation to its multi-target profile, namely its nociceptin receptor agonism, cebranopadol shows atypical effects and certain potential advantages compared to selective μ-opioid receptor agonists like morphine, such as less misuse potential and respiratory depression. On the other hand, it has a long half-life in humans and still carries risk of misuse similarly to other opioids.

Cebranopadol was first described in the patent literature by 2002 and in the scientific literature by 2013. As of August 2025, it has completed multiple phase 3 clinical trials for treatment of pain. According to its developer, a New Drug Application (NDA) is to be submitted in the near future. As a dual μ-opioid and nociceptin receptor agonist, cebranopadol is a potential first-in-class medication. Cebranopadol is not yet a controlled substance as of 2022.

== Medical uses ==
Cebranopadol remains investigational and is not yet approved for any medical use.

== Side effects ==
Side effects of cebranopadol include nausea, vomiting, pupil constriction, constipation, somnolence, euphoria, indigestion, and respiratory depression, among others. It has been found to produce less respiratory suppression than other opioid analgesics like oxycodone at equianalgesic doses.

=== Misuse potential ===
Cebranopadol poses misuse potential similarly to other opioid analgesics. In a misuse liability clinical study however, cebranopadol showed less misuse potential than hydromorphone in recreational opioid users. The drug has also shown a low potential for withdrawal symptoms.

== Pharmacology ==
=== Pharmacodynamics ===
Cebranopadol activities
Target	K_{i} (nM)	EC_{50} (nM)	E_{max} (%)
MOR	0.7	1.2	104%
NOP	0.9	13	89%
KOR	2.6	17	67%
DOR	18	110	105%
Notes: Proteins are human. The smaller the value, the more avidly the drug interacts with the site.

Cebranopadol acts as a non-selective opioid receptor agonist, including as a dual μ-opioid receptor (MOR) and nociceptin receptor (NOP) full agonist and to a lesser extent as a κ-opioid receptor partial agonist. It is also a δ-opioid receptor full agonist to a much lesser extent.

The drug shows antinociceptive and antihypertensive effects in a variety of different animal models of pain. It has analgesic ED_{50} values in animals of 0.5 to 5.6 μg/kg intravenously and 25 μg/kg orally. The drug has been found to be more effective in models of chronic neuropathic pain than acute nociceptive pain compared to selective MOR agonists. Relative to morphine, tolerance to the analgesic effects of cebranopadol has been found to be delayed (26 days versus 11 days for complete tolerance). In addition, unlike morphine, cebranopadol has not been found to affect motor coordination or reduce respiration in animals at doses within or above the dose range for analgesia. As such, it might have improved efficacy and greater tolerability in comparison to existing opioid analgesics.

As an agonist of the KOR, cebranopadol may have the capacity to produce hallucinogenic effects, dysphoria, and other adverse reactions at sufficiently high doses, a property which could potentially limit its practical clinical dose range.

=== Pharmacokinetics ===
The oral absorption of cebranopadol is thought to be complete, while its oral bioavailability is approximately 40%. Relatedly, the drug is thought to undergo substantial first-pass metabolism. The time to peak levels of cebranopadol is 4 to 6 hours. Cebranopadol shows high permeability into the central nervous system. Its half-value duration (HVD) is 14 to 15 hours, while its terminal elimination half-life is in the range of 62 to 96 hours. Cebranopadol with once-daily administration reaches steady-state levels after approximately 2 weeks, with an accumulation ratio of about 2 and a low peak-to-trough fluctuation (PTF) of about 70 to 80%.

== Chemistry ==
Cebranopadol is a spiro[cyclohexane-dihydropyrano[3,4-b]indole] derivative of the benzenoid class. It is somewhat similar in chemical structure to other indoles with opioid receptor modulator activity like noribogaine and mitragynine.

=== Synthesis ===
The chemical synthesis of cebranopadol has been described.

=== Analogues ===
A notable analogue of cebranopadol is lexanopadol (GRT-6006).

== History ==
Cebranopadol was originated by Grunenthal and has been subsequently developed by Grunenthal, Park Therapeutics, and Tris Pharma. It was first described in a patent in 2002 and was first mentioned in the scientific literature by 2013, by which point multiple phase 2 clinical trials had been completed and phase 3 trials were started. Subsequently, several dedicated journal articles on cebranopadol were published in 2014 and 2015.

== Society and culture ==
=== Names ===
Cebranopadol is the generic name of the drug and its INN and USAN. It is also known by its developmental code names GRT-6005 (Grünenthal), PRK-101 (Park Therapeutics), and TRN-228 (Tris Pharma).

=== Legal status ===
Cebranopadol is not yet a controlled substance as of 2022.

== Research ==
Cebranopadol is under development for the treatment of acute pain, back pain, postoperative pain, cancer pain, neuropathic pain, and substance-related disorders. As of August 2025, it is in phase 3 trials for acute pain, back pain, and postoperative pain, phase 2 trials for cancer pain and neuropathic pain, and phase 1 trials for substance-related disorders. Phase 3 trials for postoperative pain have been completed and data released. According to Tris Pharma, a New Drug Application (NDA) of cebranopadol would be submitted in 2025.

== See also ==
- List of investigational analgesics
- List of investigational substance-related disorder drugs
