= Nociceptin receptor =

Protein-coding gene in the species Homo sapiens

OPRL1

Identifiers
- Aliases: OPRL1, KOR-3, NOCIR, OOR, ORL1, NOP, NOPr, opioid related nociceptin receptor 1, KOR3, OPRL, PNOCR
- External IDs: OMIM: 602548; MGI: 97440; GeneCards: OPRL1
Available structures
PDB	Ortholog search: A0A0G2JQE4 PDBe A0A0G2JQE4 RCSB
PDB	List of PDB id codes 4EA3, 5DHG, 5DHH

Gene location (Human)
Chr.	Chromosome 20 (human)
Band	20q13.33	Start	64,080,082 bp
Band	20q13.33	End	64,100,643 bp

Gene location (Mouse)
Chr.	Chromosome 2 (mouse)
Band	2 H4|2 103.74 cM	Start	181,356,809 bp
Band	2 H4|2 103.74 cM	End	181,362,778 bp
RNA expression pattern
Bgee	Human / Mouse (ortholog); Top expressed in: blood; superior frontal gyrus; right frontal lobe; Brodmann area 9; white blood cell; monocyte; granulocyte; primary visual cortex; nucleus accumbens; hypothalamus / Top expressed in: ventromedial nucleus; dorsomedial hypothalamic nucleus; paraventricular nucleus of hypothalamus; arcuate nucleus; lateral hypothalamus; ventral tegmental area; lumbar subsegment of spinal cord; mammillary body; dorsal tegmental nucleus; anterior amygdaloid area; More reference expression data
BioGPS	n/a
Gene ontology
Molecular function	nociceptin receptor activity; neuropeptide binding; signal transducer activity; G protein-coupled opioid receptor activity; protein binding; G protein-coupled receptor activity; protein C-terminus binding; peptide binding
Cellular component	integral component of membrane; membrane; plasma membrane; integral component of plasma membrane; neuron projection; cytoplasmic vesicle
Biological process	response to estradiol; adenylate cyclase-inhibiting G protein-coupled receptor signaling pathway; sensory perception; positive regulation of urine volume; eating behavior; regulation of sensory perception of pain; negative regulation of blood pressure; estrous cycle; regulation of locomotor rhythm; positive regulation of gastric acid secretion; positive regulation of sensory perception of pain; sensory perception of pain; negative regulation of voltage-gated calcium channel activity; neuropeptide signaling pathway; signal transduction; chemical synaptic transmission; G protein-coupled receptor signaling pathway; animal behavior; negative regulation of cAMP-mediated signaling; negative regulation of adenylate cyclase-activating G protein-coupled receptor signaling pathway; G protein-coupled opioid receptor signaling pathway; positive regulation of cytosolic calcium ion concentration involved in phospholipase C-activating G protein-coupled signaling pathway; conditioned place preference
Sources:Amigo / QuickGO
Orthologs
Databases	NCBI: entry; OMA: entry
Species	Human	Mouse
Entrez	4987	18389
Ensembl	ENSG00000277044; ENSG00000125510	ENSMUSG00000027584
UniProt	P41146	P35377
RefSeq (mRNA)	NM_000913; NM_001200019; NM_182647; NM_001318853; NM_001318854 NM_001318855	NM_001252565; NM_011012; NM_001318919; NM_001318920; NM_001318922 NM_001318923; NM_001318924; NM_001318925
RefSeq (protein)	NP_000904; NP_001186948; NP_001305782; NP_001305783; NP_001305784 NP_872588	NP_001239494; NP_001305848; NP_001305849; NP_001305851; NP_001305852 NP_001305853; NP_001305854; NP_035142
Location (UCSC)	Chr 20: 64.08 – 64.1 Mb	Chr 2: 181.36 – 181.36 Mb
PubMed search
- Wikidata
View/Edit Human	View/Edit Mouse

The nociceptin opioid peptide receptor (NOP), also known as the nociceptin/orphanin FQ (N/OFQ) receptor or kappa-type 3 opioid receptor, is a protein that in humans is encoded by the OPRL1 (opioid receptor-like 1) gene. The nociceptin receptor is a member of the opioid subfamily of G protein-coupled receptors whose natural ligand is the 17 amino acid neuropeptide known as nociceptin (N/OFQ). This receptor is involved in the regulation of numerous brain activities, particularly instinctive and emotional behaviors. Antagonists targeting NOP are under investigation for their role as treatments for depression and Parkinson's disease, whereas NOP agonists have been shown to act as powerful, non-addictive painkillers in non-human primates.

Although NOP shares high sequence identity (~60%) with the ‘classical’ opioid receptors μ-OP (MOP), κ-OP (KOP), and δ-OP (DOP), it possesses little or no affinity for opioid peptides or morphine-like compounds. Likewise, classical opioid receptors possess little affinity towards NOP's endogenous ligand nociceptin, which is structurally related to dynorphin A.

== Discovery ==
In 1994, Mollereau et al. cloned a receptor that was highly homologous to the classical opioid receptors (OPs) μ-OR (MOP), κ-OR (KOP), and δ-OR (DOP) that came to be known as the Nociceptin Opioid Peptide receptor (NOP). As these “classical” opioid receptors were identified 30 years earlier in the mid-1960s, the physiological and pharmacological characterization of NOP as well as therapeutic development targeting this receptor remain decades behind. Although research on NOP has blossomed into its own sub-field, the lack of widespread knowledge of NOP's existence means that it is commonly omitted from studies that investigate the OP family, despite its promising role as a therapeutic target.

== Mechanism and pharmacology ==
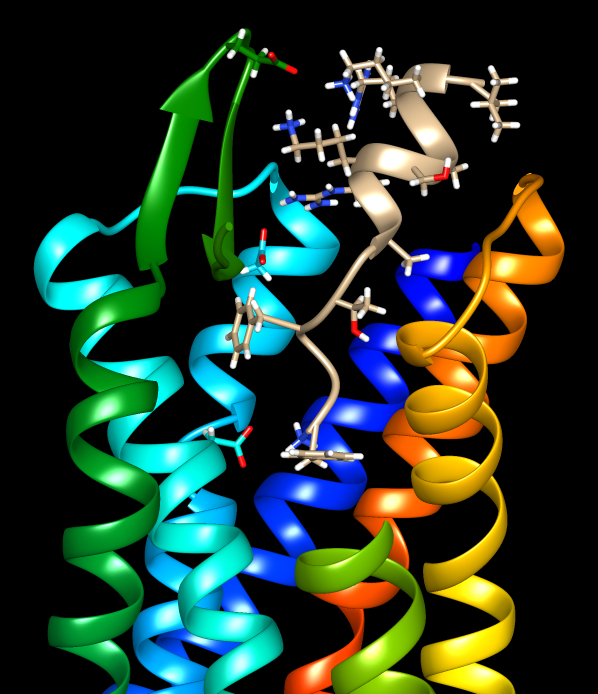
Nociceptin receptor vestibule complexed with nociceptin. Upper part of TM helix 5 is hidden.

=== NOP cellular signalling partners ===
Like most G-protein coupled receptors, NOP signals through canonical G proteins upon activation. G proteins are heterotrimeric complexes consisting of α, β, and γ subunits. NOP signals through a variety of Gα subtypes that trigger diverse downstream signaling cascades. NOP coupling to Gα_{i} or Gα_{o} subunits leads to an inhibition of adenylyl cyclase (AC) causing an intracellular decrease in cyclic adenosine monophosphate(cAMP) levels, an important second messenger for many signal transduction pathways. NOP acting through Gα_{i/o} pathways has also been shown to activate Phospholipase A2 (PLA2), thereby initiating Mitogen-activated protein kinase (MAPK) signaling cascades. In contrast to classical OPs, NOP also couples to Pertussis toxin (PTX)-insensitive subtypes Gα_{z}, Gα_{14}, and Gα_{16}, as well as potentially to Gα_{12} and Gαs. Activation of NOP's canonical β-arrestin pathway causes receptor phosphorylation, internalization, and eventual downregulation and recycling. NOP activation also causes indirect inhibition of opioid receptors MOP and KOP, resulting in anti-opioid activity in certain tissues. Additionally, NOP activation leads to the activation of potassium channels and inhibition of calcium channels which collectively inhibit neuronal firing.

=== Neuroanatomy ===
Nociceptin controls a wide range of biological functions ranging from nociception to food intake, from memory processes to cardiovascular and renal functions, from spontaneous locomotor activity to gastrointestinal motility, from anxiety to the control of neurotransmitter release at peripheral and central sites.

==== Pain circuitry ====
The outcome of NOP activation on the brain's pain circuitry is site-specific. Within the central nervous system its action can be either similar or opposite to those of opioids depending on their location. In animal models, activation of NOP in the brain stem and higher brain regions has mixed action, resulting in overall anti-opioid activity. NOP activation at the spinal cord and peripheral nervous system results in morphine-comparable analgesia in non-human primates.

==== Reward circuitry ====
NOP is highly expressed in every node of the mesocorticolimbic reward circuitry. Unlike MOP agonists such as codeine and morphine, NOP agonists do not have reinforcing effects. Nociceptin is thought to be an endogenous antagonist of dopamine transport that may act either directly on dopamine or by inhibiting GABA to affect dopamine levels. In animal models, the result of NOP activation in the central nervous system has been shown to eliminate conditioned place preference induced by morphine, cocaine, alcohol, and methamphetamine.

== Therapeutic potential ==
=== Analgesia and abuse liability ===
Recent studies indicate that targeting NOP is a promising alternative route to relieving pain without the deleterious side effects of traditional MOP-activating opioid therapies. In primates, specifically activating NOP through systemic or intrathecal administration induces long-lasting, morphine-comparable analgesia without causing itch, respiratory depression, or the reinforcing effects that lead to addiction in an intravenous self-administration paradigm; thus eliminating all of the serious side-effects of current opioid therapies.

Several commonly used opioid drugs including etorphine and buprenorphine have been demonstrated to bind to nociceptin receptors, but this binding is relatively insignificant compared to their activity at other opioid receptors in the acute setting (however the non-analgesic NOPr antagonist SB-612,111 was demonstrated to potentiate the therapeutic benefits of morphine). Chronic administration of nociceptin receptor agonists results in an attenuation of the analgesic and anti-allodynic effects of opiates; this mechanism inhibits the action of endogenous opioids as well, resulting in an increase in pain severity, depression, and both physical and psychological opiate dependence following chronic NOPr agonist administration. Administration of the NOPr antagonist SB-612,111 has been shown to inhibit this process. More recently a range of selective ligands for NOP have been developed, which show little or no affinity to other opioid receptors and so allow NOP-mediated responses to be studied in isolation.

=== Agonists ===
- AT-121 (Experimental agonist of both the μ-opioid and nociceptin receptors, showing promising results in non-human primates.)
- Buprenorphine (partial agonist, not selective for NOP, also partial agonist of μ-opioid receptors, and competitive antagonist of δ-opioid and κ-opioid receptors)
- BU08028 (Analogue of buprenorphine, partial agonist, agonist of μ-opioid receptor, has analgesic properties without physical dependence.)
- Cebranopadol (full agonist at NOP, μ-opioid and δ-opioid receptors, partial agonist at κ-opioid receptor)
- Etorphine
- Lexanopadol
- MCOPPB (full agonist)
- MT-7716
- Nociceptin
- Norbuprenorphine (full agonist; non-selective (also full agonist at the MOR and DOR and partial agonist at the KOR); peripherally-selective)
- NNC 63-0532
- Ro64-6198
- Ro65-6570
- SCH-221,510
- SR-8993
- SR-16435 (mixed MOR / NOP partial agonist)
- TH-030418

=== Antagonists ===
- AT-076 (non-selective)
- JTC-801
- J-113,397
- LY-2940094
- SB-612,111
- SR-16430
- Thienorphine

== Applications ==
NOP agonists are being studied as treatments for heart failure and migraine while nociceptin antagonists such as JTC-801 may have analgesic and antidepressant qualities.
