= Spiperone =

Chemical compound

Clinical data
- AHFS/Drugs.com: International Drug Names
- Routes of administration: Oral
- ATC code: none

Legal status
- Legal status: Rx-only (JP)

Pharmacokinetic data
- Metabolism: Hepatic
- Excretion: Renal

Identifiers
- IUPAC name: 8-[4-(4-fluorophenyl)-4-oxobutyl]-1-phenyl-1,3,8-triazaspiro[4.5]decan-4-one
- CAS Number: 749-02-0
- PubChem CID: 5265
- IUPHAR/BPS: 99
- ChemSpider: 5075
- UNII: 4X6E73CJ0Q
- KEGG: D01051
- ChEBI: CHEBI:9233
- ChEMBL: ChEMBL267930
- CompTox Dashboard (EPA): DTXSID5045205
- ECHA InfoCard: 100.010.931

Chemical and physical data
- Formula: C_{23}H_{26}FN_{3}O_{2}
- Molar mass: 395.478 g·mol^{−1}
- 3D model (JSmol): Interactive image
- SMILES: c1ccc(cc1)N2CNC(=O)C23CCN(CC3)CCCC(=O)c4ccc(cc4)F
- InChI: InChI=1S/C23H26FN3O2/c24-19-10-8-18(9-11-19)21(28)7-4-14-26-15-12-23(13-16-26)22(29)25-17-27(23)20-5-2-1-3-6-20/h1-3,5-6,8-11H,4,7,12-17H2,(H,25,29); Key:DKGZKTPJOSAWFA-UHFFFAOYSA-N

Spiperone, also known as spiroperidol and sold under the brand name Spiropitan ((JP)) is a typical antipsychotic of the butyrophenone family related to haloperidol. It is approved for clinical use in Japan as a treatment for schizophrenia.

== Pharmacology ==
=== Pharmacodynamics ===
Spiperone at targets
Receptor	K_{i} (nM)	Notes
5-HT_{1A}	17.3	
5-HT_{1B}	995	
5-HT_{1D}	2397	
5-HT_{1E}	5051	
5-HT_{1F}	3.98	
5-HT_{2A}	1.17	
5-HT_{2B}	0.8–1114.2	0.8 is bovine
5-HT_{2C}	922.9	
5-HT_{3}	>10000	Rat/other
5-HT_{5A}	2512	Mouse
5-HT_{6}	1590	Rat
5-HT_{7}	109.8	
α_{1A}	20.4	
α_{1B}	3.09	
α_{1D}	8.32	
D_{1}	398.5	
D_{2}	0.16	
D_{3}	0.34	
D_{4}	1.39	
D_{5}	4500	
H_{1}	272	
σ	353	

Spiperone interacts with various monoamine receptors.

Additionally, spiperone was identified by compound screening to be an activator of Ca^{2+} activated Cl^{−} channels (CaCCs), thus a potential target for therapy of cystic fibrosis.

== Chemistry ==
=== Derivatives ===
N-Methylspiperone (NMSP) is a derivative of spiperone that is used to study the dopamine and serotonin neurotransmitter system. Labeled with the radioisotope carbon-11, it can be used for positron emission tomography.

== See also ==
- Spirodecanone
