= J-113,397 =

Chemical compound

Clinical data
- Other names: J-113,397

Identifiers
- IUPAC name: 1-[(3R,4R)-1-cyclooctylmethyl-3-hydroxymethyl-4-piperidyl]-3-ethyl-1, 3-dihydro-2H-benzimidazol-2-one
- CAS Number: 256640-45-6 217461-40-0 (racemic)
- PubChem CID: 5311194
- IUPHAR/BPS: 1691
- ChemSpider: 4470714
- UNII: 00M5444DIY
- ChEMBL: ChEMBL357076
- CompTox Dashboard (EPA): DTXSID801018432

Chemical and physical data
- Formula: C_{24}H_{37}N_{3}O_{2}
- Molar mass: 399.579 g·mol^{−1}
- 3D model (JSmol): Interactive image
- SMILES: C4CCCCCCC4CN(CC1CO)CCC1n3c2ccccc2n(CC)c3=O
- InChI: InChI=1S/C24H37N3O2/c1-2-26-22-12-8-9-13-23(22)27(24(26)29)21-14-15-25(17-20(21)18-28)16-19-10-6-4-3-5-7-11-19/h8-9,12-13,19-21,28H,2-7,10-11,14-18H2,1H3/t20-,21+/m0/s1; Key:MBGVUMXBUGIIBQ-LEWJYISDSA-N

J-113,397 is an opioid drug which was the first compound found to be a highly selective antagonist for the nociceptin receptor, also known as the ORL-1 receptor. It is several hundred times selective for the ORL-1 receptor over other opioid receptors, and its effects in animals include preventing the development of tolerance to morphine, the prevention of hyperalgesia induced by intracerebroventricular administration of nociceptin (orphanin FQ), as well as the stimulation of dopamine release in the striatum, which increases the rewarding effects of cocaine, but may have clinical application in the treatment of Parkinson's disease.

== Synthesis ==
Patents for treating arrhythmia:

Improved synthesis: Additional patents:

Condensation between 1-Benzyl-3-methoxycarbonyl-4-piperidone [57611-47-9] (1) and O-Phenylenediamine (2) gives CID:16726310 (3). Reaction with boc anhydride followed by treatment with trifluoroacetic acid gives CID:16726358 (4). Reaction with iodoethane in the presence of base alkylates the urea nitrogen giving CID:16726359 (5). Reduction of the enamine by treatment with magnesium metal in methanol solvent occurs to give predominantly the trans isomer, CID:16726360 (6). Catalytic removal of the benzyl group gives CID:16726362 (7). Reductive amination with Cyclooctanecarbaldehyde [6688-11-5] (7) gives CID:16726364 (9). Lastly, reduction of the ester with lithium aluminium hydride completed the synthesis of J-113397 (10).

== See also ==
- JTC-801
- LY-2940094
- SB-612,111
