= Nitazenes =

Class of drugs

Skeletal formula of nitazene

Nitazenes are a chemically defined class of substances derived from the parent compound nitazene. Nitazenes were developed in the second half of the 1950s by the Swiss company Ciba AG as pain-relieving agents. They are important as centrally active, selective μ-opioid receptor agonists. The high potency of fentanyl (in humans) is matched by a few nitazenes and surpassed by etonitazene and isotonitazene. Nitazenes were never included in the pharmacopoeia of human or veterinary medicine and have not been approved for human use. Since 2019, highly potent nitazenes have proliferated as ″new synthetic opioids″ in the North American and European narcotics markets and as such have become a formative component of the opioid epidemic in the United States. Overdoses of nitazene opioids have led to several hundred documented fatalities.

== Nomenclature ==
Media reports frequently refer to nitazene class opioids simply as "nitazene", but nitazene itself is only around the same potency as morphine and has only rarely been identified as having been sold as a recreational drug. References to "nitazene" in the context of drug overdoses or police seizures almost invariably refer instead to one of the more potent analogues, but these are generally regarded as broadly interchangeable, and initial reports often do not identify the particular compound involved. Most cases of abuse and overdose are linked to potent derivatives such as metonitazene, protonitazene, isotonitazene, etonitazepyne, and etodesnitazene.

== History ==
In the mid-1950s, the pharmaceutical research department of Ciba AG discovered the (low) analgesic effect of 1-(β-diethylaminoethyl)-2-benzylbenzimidazole (desnitazene). Systematic derivatization of this parent compound in the course of structure-activity relationship investigations revealed an enhancement of activity by nitration of the 5-position. 4'-Methoxylated and ethoxylated compounds achieved potencies in the hot plate test that were previously unattained. The thus discovered etonitazene is the most potent nitazene opioid known to date. The morphine-like mechanism of action was elucidated from the antagonizability of analgesia with allylnormorphine. In a human clinical trial, two nitazenes (etonitazene and clonitazene) were investigated in 363 patients and the results were published in 1958.

The early 21st century marked the beginning of the spread of nitazene opioids in the drug scene, and in the early 2020s, the substances were recognized as emerging drugs of abuse. Isotonitazene was first identified in samples of illicit drugs, and it was implicated in opioid overdose deaths in Europe, Canada, and the United States in March and April 2019. Previously known nitazene analogs, such as metonitazene and butonitazene (as well as novel nitazenes not previously described in the scientific or patent literature), have since been discovered in toxicologic samples during forensic investigations. Nitazenes have been found in pills missold as other drugs, such as benzodiazepines, in the United Kingdom and New Zealand.

Nitazenes have fueled a drug crisis in the United Kingdom and Baltic States, with the British government reporting more than 400 overdose deaths from the drugs in the 18-month period through January 2025. In the UK, abuse of nitazene analogues first emerged in 2023 as an important cause of drug-overdose death, with it being linked to 54 deaths over a six-month period. Most of the deaths have occurred outside London. The source of supply is thought to be by post from laboratories in China, and some of the deaths have been associated by the mislabeling of nitazenes as fentanyl.

== Structure ==
The class of nitazene opioids is defined chemically by the presence of the benzimidazole core structure and pharmacologically by μ opioid agonism.

Nitazenes are benzimidazoles that are substituted with a dialkylaminoethyl group at the 1-position, in the 2-position with a substituted benzyl group and often in the 5-position, usually with a nitro group but sometimes with other substitutions. Compounds substituted in the 6-position are less effective, while the 4- or 7-substituted compounds are not analgesically active. Analgesically active nitazenes are also usually substituted in the para-position of the benzyl group, and only rarely in the ortho or meta positions. At the methylene linker, a methyl or an amide group is tolerated stereospecifically by the target receptor, and this carbon can also be replaced by CH_{2}CH_{2}, S, or NCH_{3} with reduced but in some cases still significant activity. Nitazenes are structurally unrelated to most other opioids, but have structural similarity to benzimidazole derivatives from the orphine group, as well as to viminol and its analogues.

The compounds are derived from the historical prototype 1-(β-diethylaminoethyl)-2-benzylbenzimidazole (desnitazene). The replacement of the N,N-dialkylamino unit by pyrrolidinyl or piperidinyl, which is found in nitazepyne and nitazepipne compounds, falls into the spectrum of designer drugs. Substitution of the benzyl for thienylmethyl, pyridylmethyl, α-napthylmethyl or styryl has a potency-reducing effect. Substitution in position 4 of the benzyl affects analgesic potency in the following order: ethoxy > isopropyloxy > n-propyloxy > methoxy > methylthio > H/Cl/F > hydroxy. The most potent of the known compounds contain a nitro group in position 5. The replacement of benzimidazole with an indole has been known from studies conducted by Ciba AG since 1963.

== Detection ==
Since 2024, an immunoassay-based point-of-care testing in the form of test strips is available for the detection of nitazenes. The drug sample is added to water and requires sufficient solubility for the test to be successful. The detection limit of the highly potent isotonitazene is given as 2000-3000 ng/mL. The test is of limited general applicability for non-nitazene benzimidazole opioids. Desnitazenes, for example, which are not substituted at the benzo structure portion, cannot be successfully tested by this method. According to the manufacturer, there is no cross-reactivity with frequently used adulterants such as acetaminophen, caffeine, diphenhydramine, other non-benzimidazole opioids (heroin, methadone, fentanyl) and common non-opioid drugs (xylazine, MDMA, cocaine, ketamine).

== Pharmacology ==
=== Metabolism ===
The metabolization of nitazenes is species-dependent. In humans, the main degradation pathways are N-deethylation and, in cases of 4'-ethers, O-dealkylation. The 4'-hydroxy compounds are eliminated more quickly via the urine due to higher hydrophilicity and are predominantly detectable in the urine. CYP3A4 or CYP2C8 are likely to be involved in N-deethylation. Reduction of the nitro group occurs extrahepatically, probably via bacteria of the intestinal flora. Bioconjugates are excreted as various O-glucuronides. The N3 oxide is a secondary metabolite in humans. The 4'-hydroxy compounds in urine and the N-deethyl compounds in blood serve as forensic biomarkers.

== Table of nitazenes ==
Structure	Name	Ring sub.	Analgesic potency (morphine = 1)	PubChem	CAS #
	Desnitazene (1-diethylaminoethyl-2-benzyl-benzimidazole)	hydrogen	0.1	28787	17817-67-3
	Metodesnitazene (Metazene)	4-methoxy	1	26412	14030-77-4; 1071546-40-1 (HCl)
	Metodesnitazepyne	4-methoxy			
	Etodesnitazene (Etazene)	4-ethoxy	70	149797386	14030-76-3
	Etodesnitazepyne	4-ethoxy	20	162623599	
	Etodesnitazepipne	4-ethoxy	10	162623611	102762-98-1
	Protodesnitazene	4-(n-propoxy)	10	157010653	805212-21-9
	Isotodesnitazene	4-isopropoxy	>75	162623708	2732926-27-9
	Butodesnitazene	4-butoxy			
	Desnitroclonitazene	4-chloro		45590863	
	Nitazene	hydrogen	2	15327524	14030-71-8
	Thenylnitazene	hydrogen (with thiophene ring)	1		
	Ethylene nitazene	hydrogen	0.5	15327525	194537-85-4
	meta-Metonitazene	3-methoxy	2		96168-49-9
	Metonitazene	4-methoxy	100	53316366	14680-51-4
	Metonitazepyne	4-methoxy			3053113-16-6
	Metonitazepipne	4-methoxy			
	N-Desethylmetonitazene	4-methoxy			
	Metomethazene	4-methoxy			95138-58-2
	Dimetonitazene	3,4-dimethoxy	10	162623836	95809-33-9
	2-Fluorometonitazene	2-fluoro-4-methoxy			
	3-Chlorometonitazene	3-chloro-4-methoxy			
	α'-Methylmetonitazene	4-methoxy	50	162625089	806634-80-0
	α'-Methyletonitazene	4-ethoxy			
	α'-hydroxy-etonitazene (EA-5270)	4-ethoxy		21815907	
	Metonitazene phenethyl homologue (Ethylene metonitazene)	4-methoxy	50		
	Ethylene etonitazene	4-ethoxy			
	Etonitazene	4-ethoxy	1000–1500	13493	911-65-9
	4'-hydroxy-nitazene, (AKA 4'-OH-nitazene, O-desethyl-etonitazene, O-desalkyl isotonitazene) (Shared metabolite of many nitazenes)	4-hydroxy	1	156588969	94758-81-3
	N-Desethyletonitazene (NDE)	4-ethoxy	1000/1500–2000	162623580	2732926-26-8
	Etonitazene 5-amino metabolite	4-ethoxy	2	13408927	75821-80-6
	Etomethazene	4-ethoxy	20	168310446	95293-25-7
	6-Methyldesnitroetonitazene (Iso-etomethazene)	4-ethoxy		172872037	
	Etonitazene 5-trifluoromethyl analogue (Etotriflazene)	4-ethoxy		21815908	15451-92-0
	5-Trifluoromethyl isotodesnitazene (Isototriflazene)	4-isopropoxy			15451-92-0
	Metocyanozene (5-cyano metodesnitazene)	4-methoxy			
	Etocyanozene (Etonitazene 5-cyano analogue)	4-ethoxy		27268	15419-87-1
	Protocyanazene	4-propoxy			
	Isotocyanozene	4-isopropoxy			
	Etoacetazene (Etonitazene 5-acetyl analogue)	4-ethoxy		25957	13406-60-5
	Etonitazene 5,6-dichloro analogue (Etodicloazene)	4-ethoxy			102476-04-0
	Etonitazene N,N-dimethyl analogue	4-ethoxy	20	67089584	714190-52-0
	Etonitazepyne	4-ethoxy	180–190	155804760	2785346-75-8
	Etonitazepipne	4-ethoxy	190	162623834	734496-28-7
	Etonitazene morpholine analogue	4-ethoxy	2	162623685	805958-08-1
	1-Ethyl pyrrolidinylmethyl N-desalkyl etonitazene (EP-ENZ)	4-ethoxy			
	Etonitazene 6-nitro isomer (iso-etonitazene)	4-ethoxy	20	59799752	114160-61-1
	Protonitazene	4-(n-propoxy)	200	156589001	119276-01-6; 95958-84-2
	Protonitazepyne	4-(n-propoxy)	180–190	168322728	
	Protonitazepipne	4-(n-propoxy)			
	N-Desethylprotonitazene	4-(n-propoxy)		168310594	
	Isotonitazene (partly metabolised to the more potent N-Desethylisotonitazene)	4-isopropoxy	500	145721979	14188-81-9
	Isotonitazepyne	4-isopropoxy		168322631	
	Isotonitazepipne	4-isopropoxy			
	N-Desethylisotonitazene (an active metabolite of isotonitazene)	4-isopropoxy	1000–2000	162623899	2732926-24-6
	iso-isotonitazene	4-isopropoxy			
	N-Pyrrolidino ethylene isotonitazene	4-isopropoxy			
	Allonitazene	4-allyloxy			
	Cyprotonitazene	4-cyclopropoxy			
	Butonitazene	4-butoxy	5	156588955	95810-54-1
	Isobutonitazene	4-isobutoxy		168322282	
	Secbutonitazene	4-secbutoxy		168322285	
	Etoetonitazene	4-ethoxyethoxy	50	162623504	806642-21-7
	MeTEG-nitazene	4-(triethylene glycol methyl ether)	3		
	Fluetonitazene (fluornitrazene)	4-(2-fluoroethoxy)		172332078	
	N-Desethylfluornitrazene	4-(2-fluoroethoxy)			
	Fluetonitazepyne	4-(2-fluoroethoxy)		172871918	
	Trifluorometonitazene	4-trifluoromethoxy			954386-78-8
	Flunitazene	4-fluoro	1	156588967	2728-91-8
	Clonitazene	4-chloro	3	62528	3861-76-5
	Diclonitazene	2,4-dichloro			
	α'-carboxamido-clonitazene	4-chloro	3		
	Bronitazene	4-bromo	5	162623726	
	Nitronitazene	4-nitro	0.2		101795-25-9
	Cyanonitazene	4-cyano			
	Trifluoromenitazene	4-trifluoromethyl			
	Menitazene (Methylnitazene)	4-methyl	10	162623683	95282-00-1
	Ethylnitazene (Enitazene)	4-ethyl	20	162623845	114160-82-6
	Propylnitazene (Pronitazene)	4-propyl	50	162623877	700342-00-3
	t-Butylnitazene	4-(tert-butyl)	2	162623621	805215-64-9
	Acetoxynitazene	4-acetoxy	5	162623779	102760-24-7
	Methionitazene	4-methylthio	50	162623790	102471-37-4
	Ethylthionitazene	4-ethylthio	30	162623931	102758-70-3
	Etodesnitazene phenylthio analogue	4-ethoxy	1	21045	3275-92-1
	Etodesnitazene phenylthio / pyrrolidine analogue	4-ethoxy	2	19846499	13451-68-8
	Methylenedioxynitazene	3,4-methylenedioxy			
	Ethyleneoxynitazene	fused tetrahydrofuran			
