= Isotodesnitazene =

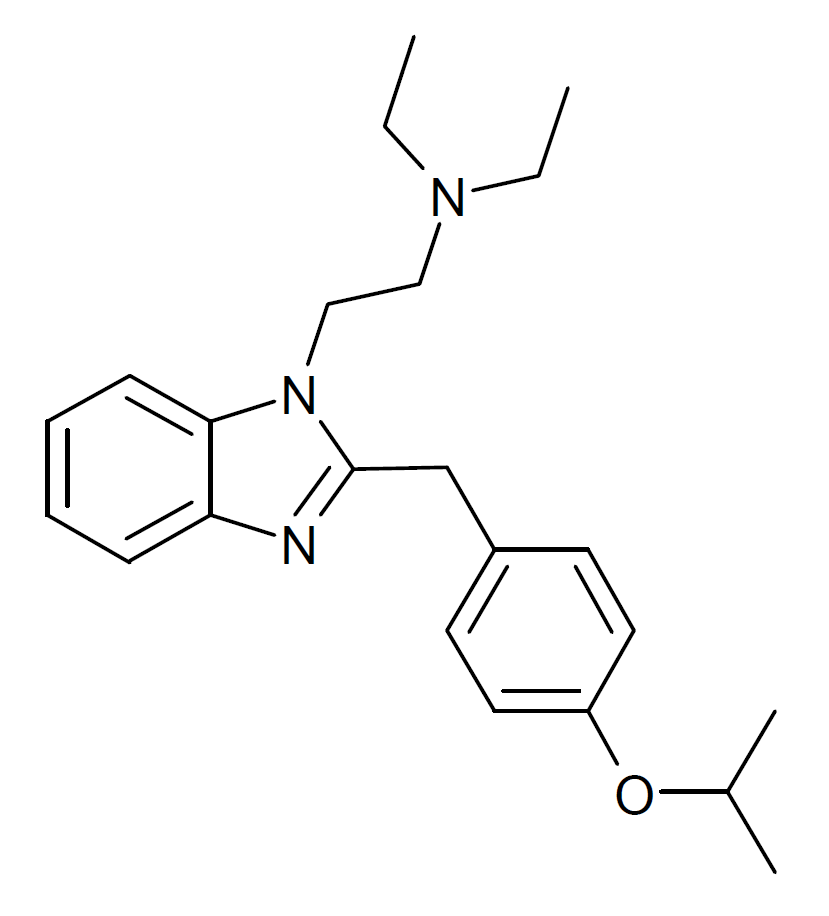

Identifiers
- IUPAC name: 2-[(4-isopropoxyphenyl)methyl]-1-(2-diethylaminoethyl)benzimidazole
- CAS Number: 2732926-27-9
- PubChem CID: 162623708
- ChemSpider: 129433097
- UNII: 4BT3F5A8T6

Chemical and physical data
- Formula: C_{23}H_{31}N_{3}O
- Molar mass: 365.521 g·mol^{−1}
- 3D model (JSmol): Interactive image
- SMILES: CCN(CC)CCN1C2=CC=CC=C2N=C1CC3=CC=C(C=C3)OC(C)C
- InChI: InChI=1S/C23H31N3O/c1-5-25(6-2)15-16-26-22-10-8-7-9-21(22)24-23(26)17-19-11-13-20(14-12-19)27-18(3)4/h7-14,18H,5-6,15-17H2,1-4H3; Key:MXCQZQAWFBUAJT-UHFFFAOYSA-N

Isotodesnitazene is a benzimidazole derivative which has potent opioid effects, having approximately 75x the potency of morphine. While isotodesnitazene itself appears to have been only rarely sold as a designer drug, numerous closely related compounds such as metodesnitazene, etodesnitazene, protodesnitazene, butodesnitazene, isotonitazene, isotonitazepyne and isotocyanozene have all been sold on the illicit market, so the pharmacological and analytical properties of isotodesnitazene have also been studied in the expectation that it may similarly become prominent at some point.

== See also ==
- Etonitazene
- List of benzimidazole opioids
