= N-Desethylprotonitazene =

Chemical compound

Clinical data
- Routes of administration: Oral, intransal, vaporized

Legal status
- Legal status: DE: Anlage II (Authorized trade only, not prescriptible)

Identifiers
- IUPAC name: N-Ethyl-2-(5-nitro-2-(4-propoxybenzyl)-1H-benzo[d]imidazol-1-yl)ethan-1-amine
- PubChem CID: 168310594

Chemical and physical data
- Formula: C_{21}H_{26}N_{4}O_{3}
- Molar mass: 382.464 g·mol^{−1}
- 3D model (JSmol): Interactive image
- SMILES: CCCOC1=CC=C(CC2=NC3=CC([N+]([O-])=O)=CC=C3N2CCNCC)C=C1
- InChI: InChI=1S/C21H26N4O3/c1-3-13-28-18-8-5-16(6-9-18)14-21-23-19-15-17(25(26)27)7-10-20(19)24(21)12-11-22-4-2/h5-10,15,22H,3-4,11-14H2,1-2H3; Key:NPHUSRHIDKYNDO-UHFFFAOYSA-N

N-Desethylprotonitazene is a benzimidazole opioid with potent analgesic effects which has been sold as a designer drug. It was first identified in 2024 as an active metabolite of the closely related compound protonitazene, and was found to have less potency than it while still being more potent than fentanyl.

It was discovered in a drug sample from Chicago in June 2025.

== See also ==
- Etonitazene
- Etodesnitazene
- Metonitazene
- N-Desethylisotonitazene
- N-Desethyletonitazene
