= Ethyleneoxynitazene =

Chemical compound

Tetrahydrofuranitazene

Identifiers
- IUPAC name: 2-(2-((2,3-dihydrobenzofuran-5-yl)methyl)-5-nitro-1H-benzo[d]imidazol-1-yl)-N,N-diethylethan-1-amine
- PubChem CID: 168310596

Chemical and physical data
- Formula: C_{22}H_{26}N_{4}O_{3}
- Molar mass: 394.475 g·mol^{−1}
- 3D model (JSmol): Interactive image
- SMILES: CCN(CC)CCN1C(CC2=CC=C(OCC3)C3=C2)=NC4=CC([N+]([O-])=O)=CC=C14
- InChI: InChI=1S/C22H26N4O3/c1-3-24(4-2)10-11-25-20-7-6-18(26(27)28)15-19(20)23-22(25)14-16-5-8-21-17(13-16)9-12-29-21/h5-8,13,15H,3-4,9-12,14H2,1-2H3; Key:IPSJQZUMCSELFZ-UHFFFAOYSA-N

Ethyleneoxynitazene (tetrahydrofuranitazene) is a benzimidazole derivative which has been sold as a designer drug over the internet and has opioid effects, though with lower potency than etonitazene itself It is an analogue of etonitazene where the 4-ethoxy group attached to the benzyl ring has been cyclised round to the 3-position to form a 2,3-dihydrobenzofuran ring system. It was first reported in Estonia in February 2023, subsequently in the UK in late 2023 and in China July 1st.

== See also ==
- Etonitazepyne
- Etomethazene
- Isotonitazene
- Methylenedioxynitazene
- List of benzimidazole opioids
- Substituted benzofuran
