= Isotonitazepyne =

Chemical compound

Identifiers
- IUPAC name: 5-nitro-2-[4-(2-propoxy)benzyl]-1-[2-(pyrrolidin-1-yl)ethyl]-1H-benzo[d]imidazole
- CAS Number: 3053113-12-2
- PubChem CID: 168322631
- ChemSpider: 128918598
- UNII: ERF4K35UV5

Chemical and physical data
- Formula: C_{23}H_{28}N_{4}O_{3}
- Molar mass: 408.502 g·mol^{−1}
- 3D model (JSmol): Interactive image
- SMILES: CC(C)OC1=CC=C(C=C1)CC2=NC3=C(N2CCN4CCCC4)C=CC(=C3)[N+](=O)[O-]
- InChI: InChI=1S/C23H28N4O3/c1-17(2)30-20-8-5-18(6-9-20)15-23-24-21-16-19(27(28)29)7-10-22(21)26(23)14-13-25-11-3-4-12-25/h5-10,16-17H,3-4,11-15H2,1-2H3; Key:VRKDSDBBRNHHCR-UHFFFAOYSA-N

Isotonitazepyne (N-pyrrolidino-isotonitazene, NPI) is a benzimidazole derivative with potent opioid effects, which has been sold as a designer drug over the internet. Its in vitro potency is approximately 1000 times that of morphine. One sample of counterfeit oxycodone pills were found to contain between 3.3 and 3.5 mg of NPI per pill and no oxycodone.

== Timeline of detections ==
NPI was first identified in the UK in August 2024 by WEDINOS as samples W054816 and W057074, then the full chemical characterisation and first literature reported sample was provided by CanTEST in Australia in September 2024,. NPI was later detected in the Netherlands in May 2025, and in Finland in early 2025.

== Legal status ==
This section is not exhaustive and does not include information for all countries with laws covering isotonitazepyne.

=== USA ===
==== Virginia ====
It is specifically listed as an illegal drug in the US state of Virginia.

=== United Kingdom ===
Since 15 January 2025 it is covered by the UK's generic definition on 2-benzyl benzimidazole derived opioids because it contains the backbone with only the following modifications:

- The nitrogen of the ethanamine (and no other atoms of the side chain) is included in a cyclic structure.
- The phenyl ring of the benzyl system is substituted by an alkoxy group containing three carbon atoms.
- The 5- position of the benzimidazole system is substituted by a nitro group.

== See also ==
- Isotonitazene
- Metonitazene
- Etomethazene
- Etonitazepipne
- List of benzimidazole opioids
