= N-Desethylisotonitazene =

Chemical compound

Clinical data
- Routes of administration: Oral, intransal, vaporized

Legal status
- Legal status: DE: Anlage II (Authorized trade only, not prescriptible); UK: Under Psychoactive Substances Act

Identifiers
- IUPAC name: N-Ethyl-2-[5-nitro-2-[(4-propoxyphenyl)methyl]benzimidazol-1-yl]ethanamine
- CAS Number: 2732926-24-6
- PubChem CID: 162623899
- UNII: T7LMM4S8UR
- CompTox Dashboard (EPA): DTXSID901342232

Chemical and physical data
- Formula: C_{21}H_{26}N_{4}O_{3}
- Molar mass: 382.464 g·mol^{−1}
- 3D model (JSmol): Interactive image
- SMILES: CCNCCN1C2=C(C=C(C=C2)[N+](=O)[O-])N=C1CC3=CC=C(C=C3)OC(C)C
- InChI: InChI=1S/C21H26N4O3/c1-4-22-11-12-24-20-10-7-17(25(26)27)14-19(20)23-21(24)13-16-5-8-18(9-6-16)28-15(2)3/h5-10,14-15,22H,4,11-13H2,1-3H3; Key:HHBRZWRJZICFRP-UHFFFAOYSA-N

N-Desethylisotonitazene (norisotonitazene) is a benzimidazole opioid with potent analgesic effects which has been sold as a designer drug. It was first identified in 2023 as an active metabolite of the closely related compound isotonitazene, and was found to have similar potency. It is one of the strongest benzimidazole opioids discovered, with an analgesic strength 20 times stronger than fentanyl.

Starting in 2023, it has become an increasingly widespread drug of abuse in its own right, linked to numerous overdose cases, and may be considered an analog of the schedule 1 drug metonitazene. In October 2023, the DEA published an intent to temporarily schedule etonitazepipne and N-desethylisotonitazene. As of April 2024, it is not yet controlled in the United States.

== See also ==
- Etonitazene
- Etodesnitazene
- Metonitazene
- N-Desethyletonitazene
