= Etoetonitazene =

Chemical compound

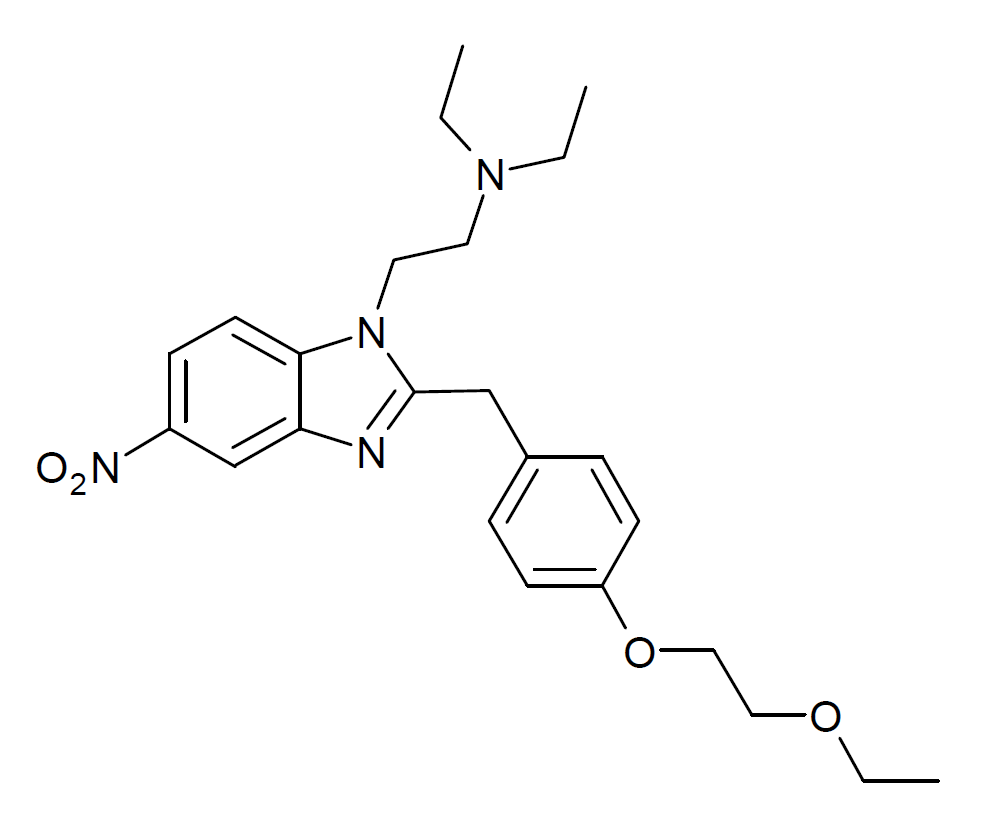

Identifiers
- IUPAC name: 2-[2-[[4-(2-ethoxyethoxy)phenyl]methyl]-5-nitrobenzimidazol-1-yl]-N,N-diethylethanamine
- CAS Number: 806642-21-7
- PubChem CID: 162623504
- ChemSpider: 129433156
- UNII: 7UM76V2RG4

Chemical and physical data
- Formula: C_{24}H_{32}N_{4}O_{4}
- Molar mass: 440.544 g·mol^{−1}
- 3D model (JSmol): Interactive image
- SMILES: CCN(CC)CCN1C2=C(C=C(C=C2)[N+](=O)[O-])N=C1CC3=CC=C(C=C3)OCCOCC
- InChI: InChI=1S/C24H32N4O4/c1-4-26(5-2)13-14-27-23-12-9-20(28(29)30)18-22(23)25-24(27)17-19-7-10-21(11-8-19)32-16-15-31-6-3/h7-12,18H,4-6,13-17H2,1-3H3; Key:NWEAJFXJKVCITM-UHFFFAOYSA-N

Etoetonitazene is a benzimidazole derivative with opioid effects, first developed in the 1950s as part of the research that led to better-known compounds such as etonitazene. It is an analogue of etonitazene where the ethoxy sidechain has been extended to ethoxyethoxy. It is less potent than other benzimidazole class opioids, but is still a potent mu opioid receptor agonist with around 50x the potency of morphine, and has been sold as a designer drug since around 2022.

== See also ==
- Butonitazene
- Isotonitazene
- Methylenedioxynitazene
- List of benzimidazole opioids
