= Methylenedioxynitazene =

Chemical compound

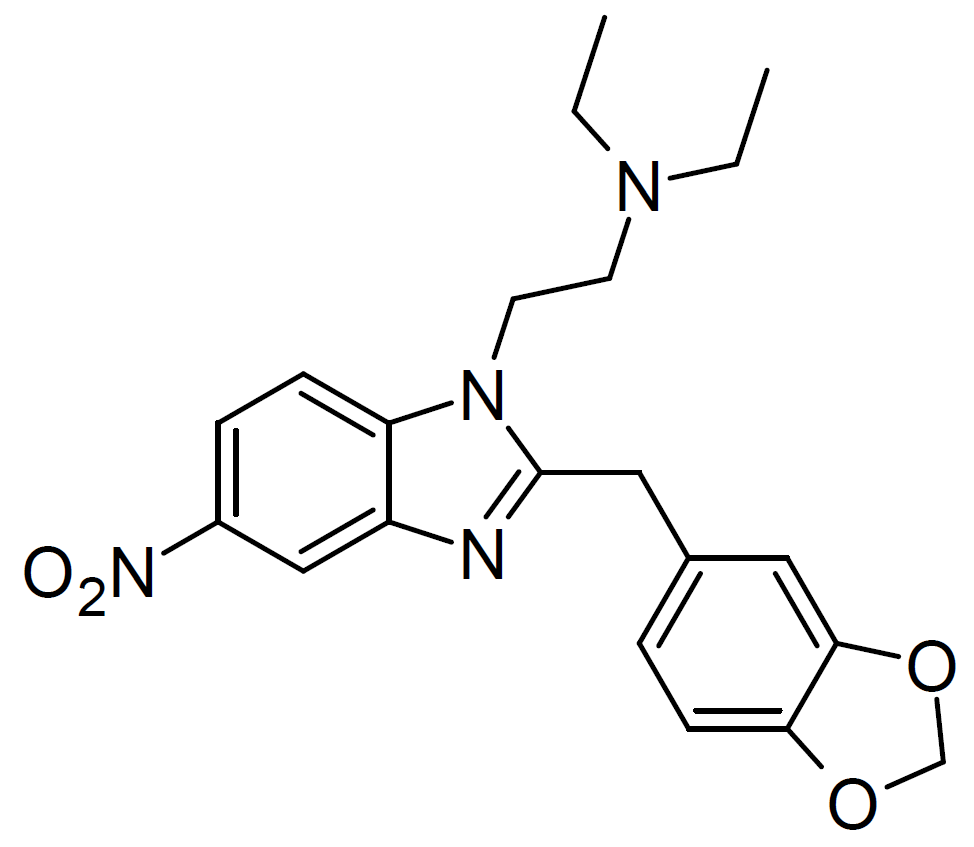

Identifiers
- IUPAC name: 2-(2-((1,3-benzodioxol-5-yl)methyl)-5-nitro-1H-benzo[d]imidazol-1-yl)-N,N-diethylethan-1-amine
- CAS Number: 3085641-38-6

Chemical and physical data
- Formula: C_{21}H_{24}N_{4}O_{4}
- Molar mass: 396.447 g·mol^{−1}
- 3D model (JSmol): Interactive image
- SMILES: CCN(CC)CCn4c(Cc2ccc1OCOc1c2)nc3cc([N+]([O-])=O)ccc34
- InChI: InChI=InChI=1S/C21H24N4O4/c1-3-23(4-2)9-10-24-18-7-6-16(25(26)27)13-17(18)22-21(24)12-15-5-8-19-20(11-15)29-14-28-19/h5-8,11,13H,3-4,9-10,12,14H2,1-2H3; Key:RRRJUZFZCVIDSM-UHFFFAOYSA-N

Methylenedioxynitazene (3',4'-Methylenedioxynitazene) is a benzimidazole derivative which has been sold as a designer drug over the internet and presumably has opioid effects. It is an analogue of etonitazene where the benzyl ring is substituted with a 3,4-methylenedioxy ring system rather than an ethoxy group. It was first reported in the UK in early 2024.

== See also ==
- Etoetonitazene
- Etonitazepyne
- Isotonitazene
- Tetrahydrofuranitazene
- List of benzimidazole opioids
