= Cannabis in Sierra Leone =

Cannabis in Sierra Leone is illegal, but is widely cultivated and consumed in the country, and exported to neighboring countries and to Europe. Cannabis is known locally as diamba.

== History ==
Cannabis is believed to have become commonly cultivated in Sierra Leone well before it became widespread in West Africa. Midwives used it as anaesthesia for childbirth, and fishermen used it to deal with their difficult labors. An 1851 journal article reported that cannabis had been "long in use" in the interior of Sierra Leone, and claimed that cannabis seeds were brought to the colony by "Congoes captured by one of our cruisers." Sierra Leonean sailors and stevedores played a role in disseminating cannabis regionally, spreading the use of the drug to Ghana and Gambia.

Cannabis was first banned in Sierra Leone in 1920, during the country's British colonial period; cannabis was included in that year as an addendum to the nation's 1913 Opium Act.

== Cultivation ==
The 2011 International Narcotics Control Strategy Report noted that cannabis is widely cultivated in Sierra Leone, to the degree that the national government was concerned that cannabis may be crowding out subsistence farming and threatening food security.

== Popularity ==
A doctor stated to Sierra Leone's Truth and Reconciliation Committee in 2003: "Cannabis sativa is so commonly used or abused in Sierra Leone... that I don't think people consider it a crime any more to use it... As you can see, it is grown nearly everywhere in Sierra Leone today. You can get it anytime, anywhere, either for free or for a low fee."

== Kush ==
In the early 2020s, a drug called Kush began to emerge in younger people in Sierra Leone causing societal issues. It is not to be confused with the synonymous marijuana strain. It first appeared in the mid to late 2010s, but has grown in popularity. The composition was initially unclear, but has been described as a synthetic cannabinoid-like drug that is made from a combination of different chemicals and plants. It may contain opioids, cannabis, disinfectants and allegedly even ground human bones sourced from local graveyards.

Early anecdotal reports suggested the active components to be opioids such as fentanyl and tramadol, but subsequent laboratory analysis of kush samples has shown it to be a plant base of marshmallow, mixed with synthetic cannabinoids and/or nitazene based synthetic opioids. Some samples contained just synthetic cannabinoids, some samples contained just nitazenes, and some samples contained both types of drug. The main cannabinoid found was MDMB-4en-PINACA and in one sample also AB-CHMINACA, while the main opioids found were either protonitazene or protonitazepyne, or less commonly metonitazene. None of the samples tested contained tramadol, fentanyl, or material consistent with ground up human bones.

It is produced and distributed by criminal gangs. Kush has led to reports of self-harm and violence. It can cause the users to enter a catatonic, zombie-like state. Medical personnel in Freetown reported up to 90% of the male admissions to the central psychiatric ward were related to Kush use. In 2024, it was reported to cause a dozen deaths per week.
