= C23H30N4O3 =

The molecular formula C_{23}H_{30}N_{4}O_{3} (molar mass: 410.518 g/mol) may refer to:

- Isotonitazene
- Protonitazene
- α'-Methyletonitazene
