= Butodesnitazene =

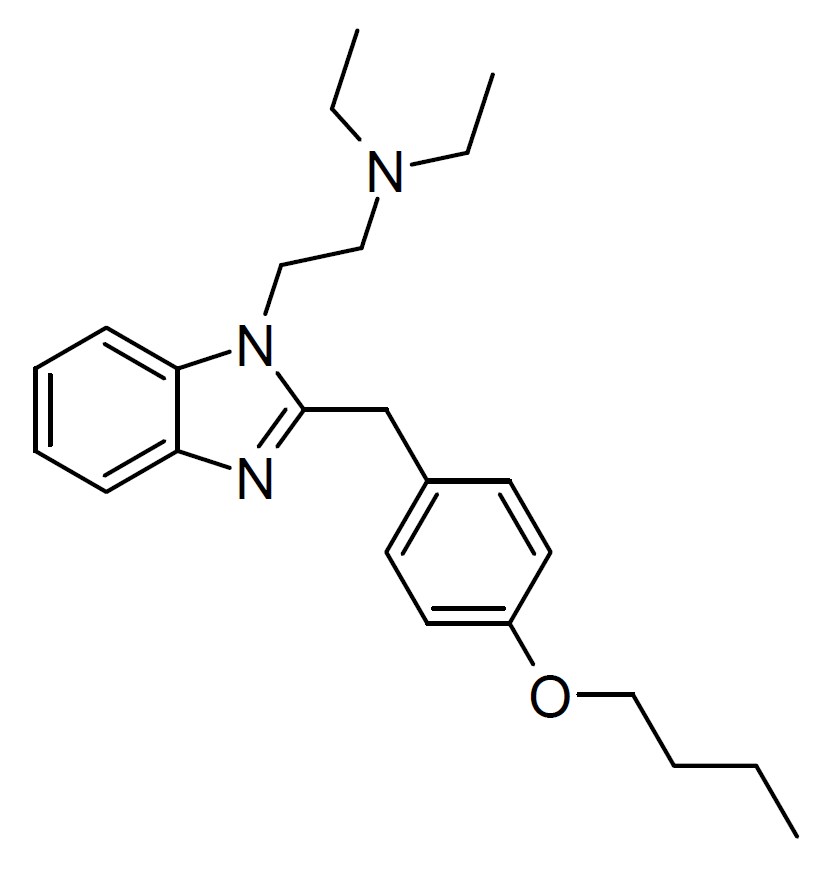

Identifiers
- IUPAC name: 2-[(4-Butoxyphenyl)methyl]-1-(2-diethylaminoethyl)benzimidazole

Chemical and physical data
- Formula: C_{24}H_{33}N_{3}O
- Molar mass: 379.548 g·mol^{−1}
- 3D model (JSmol): Interactive image
- SMILES: CCN(CC)CCn1c(nc2ccccc12)Cc1ccc(OCCCC)cc1
- InChI: InChI=InChI=1S/C24H33N3O/c1-4-7-18-28-21-14-12-20(13-15-21)19-24-25-22-10-8-9-11-23(22)27(24)17-16-26(5-2)6-3/h8-15H,4-7,16-19H2,1-3H3; Key:NOCZAWHIDDFBFO-UHFFFAOYSA-N

Butodesnitazene is a benzimidazole derivative with opioid effects, which has been sold as a designer drug. It was identified by drug checking services in New Zealand in 2025, having been sold on the black market misrepresented as heroin. Its pharmacological properties have not been studied, although based on the known structure-activity relationships of the benzimidazole opioids, it is expected to have comparatively low potency.

== See also ==
- Butonitazene
- Etodesnitazene
- Isotodesnitazene
- Metodesnitazene
- Protodesnitazene
