= Etocyanozene =

Chemical compound

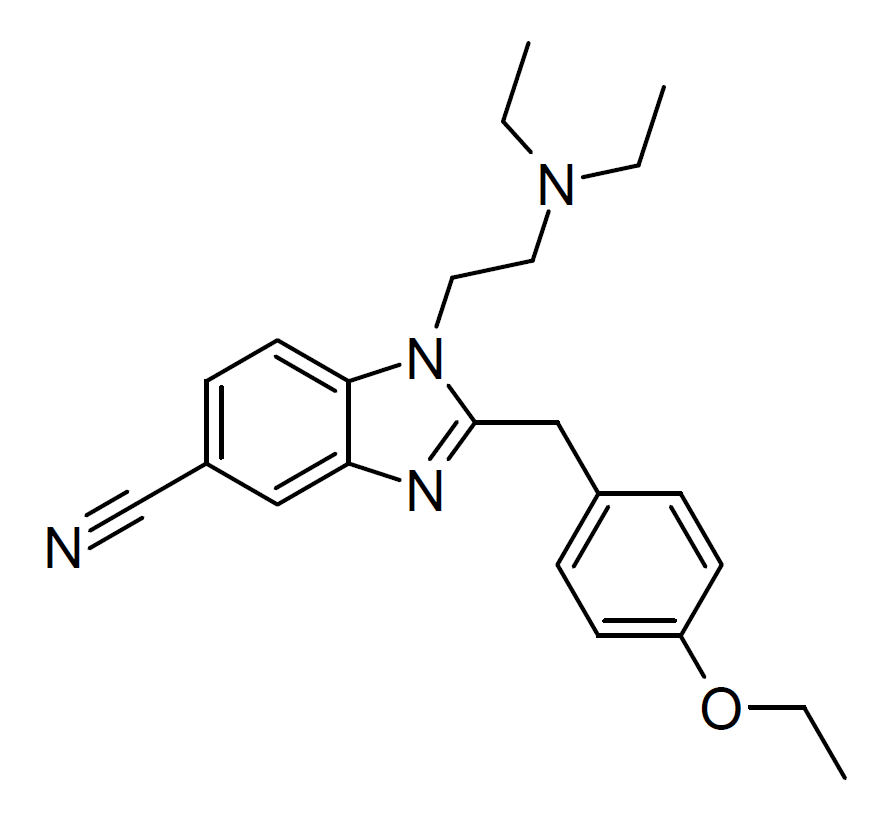

Identifiers
- IUPAC name: 1-[2-(diethylamino)ethyl]-2-[(4-ethoxyphenyl)methyl]benzimidazole-5-carbonitrile
- CAS Number: 15419-87-1
- PubChem CID: 27269
- ChemSpider: 25380

Chemical and physical data
- Formula: C_{23}H_{28}N_{4}O
- Molar mass: 376.504 g·mol^{−1}
- 3D model (JSmol): Interactive image
- SMILES: CCN(CC)CCN1C2=C(C=C(C=C2)C#N)N=C1CC3=CC=C(C=C3)OCC
- InChI: InChI=1S/C23H28N4O/c1-4-26(5-2)13-14-27-22-12-9-19(17-24)15-21(22)25-23(27)16-18-7-10-20(11-8-18)28-6-3/h7-12,15H,4-6,13-14,16H2,1-3H3; Key:SMNJGNKSTXLJSY-UHFFFAOYSA-N

Etocyanozene (etocyanazene, 5-cyano-etodesnitazene) is a benzimidazole opioid 'desnitazene' derivative with opioid effects. It was first developed in the 1950s as part of the research that led to better-known compounds such as etonitazene. It is an analogue of etonitazene where the 5-nitro (NO_{2}) group has been replaced by a nitrile (C≡N) group. It is described as having "reduced but still significant" potency compared to etonitazene itself. It was made illegal in Germany in July 2021.

== See also ==
- Etoacetazene
- Etodesnitazene
- Etomethazene
- Isotocyanozene
- MCHB-1
- List of benzimidazole opioids
