= Protodesnitazene =

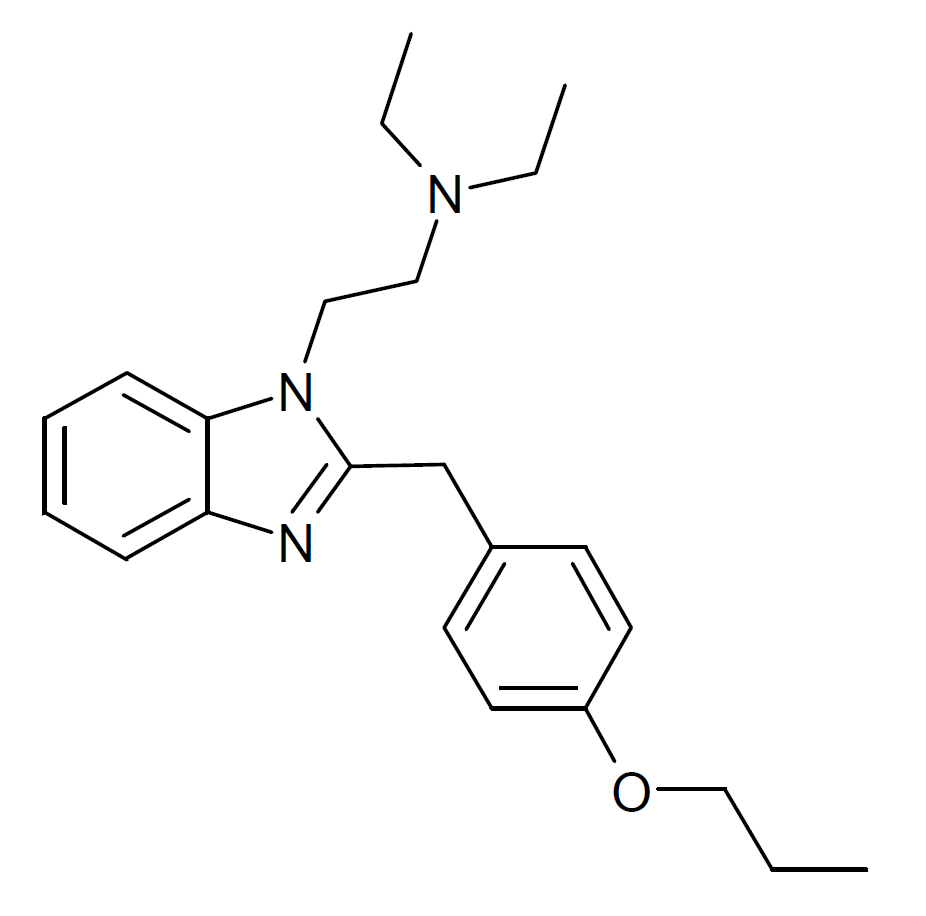

Identifiers
- IUPAC name: N,N-diethyl-2-[2-[(4-propoxyphenyl)methyl]benzimidazol-1-yl]ethanamine
- CAS Number: 805212-21-9
- PubChem CID: 157010653
- ChemSpider: 129433206
- UNII: 3U89F8KB95

Chemical and physical data
- Formula: C_{23}H_{31}N_{3}O
- Molar mass: 365.521 g·mol^{−1}
- 3D model (JSmol): Interactive image
- SMILES: CCCOC1=CC=C(C=C1)CC2=NC3=CC=CC=C3N2CCN(CC)CC
- InChI: InChI=1S/C23H31N3O/c1-4-17-27-20-13-11-19(12-14-20)18-23-24-21-9-7-8-10-22(21)26(23)16-15-25(5-2)6-3/h7-14H,4-6,15-18H2,1-3H3; Key:CEHFMRGBRNNSCM-UHFFFAOYSA-N

Protodesnitazene is a benzimidazole derivative which has been sold as a designer drug, and has potent opioid effects. It has been identified in Canada, Australia, the United Kingdom and Finland, first appearing in early 2025.

== See also ==
- Butodesnitazene
- Etodesnitazene
- Etomethazene
- Metodesnitazene
- Protonitazene
- List of benzimidazole opioids
