= Menitazene =

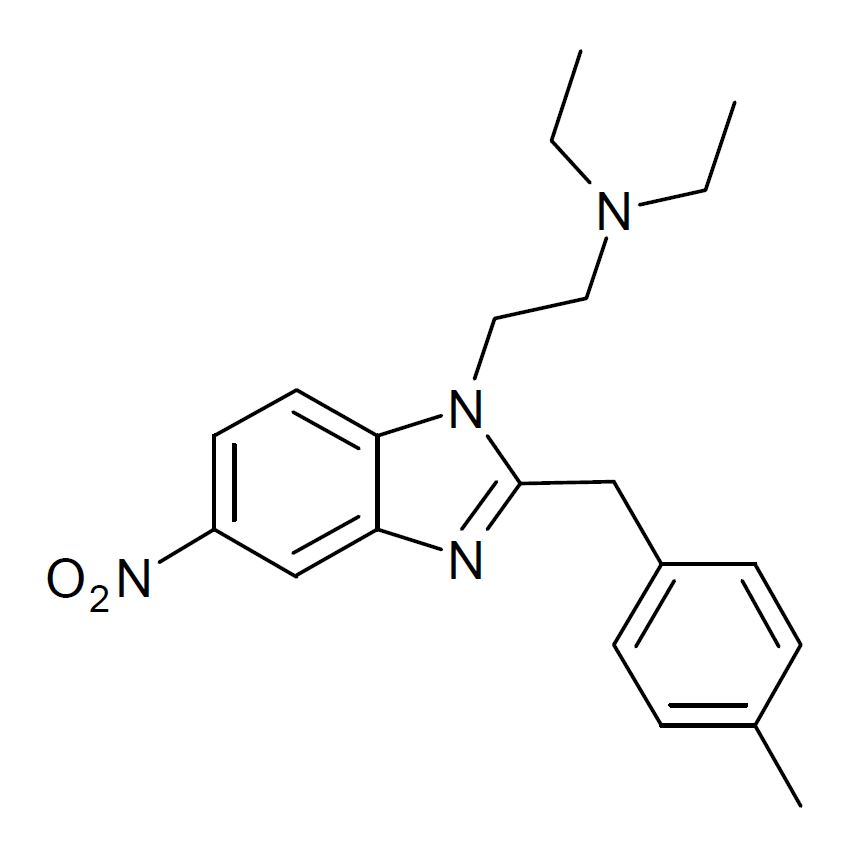

Identifiers
- IUPAC name: N,N-diethyl-2-[2-[(4-methylphenyl)methyl]-5-nitrobenzimidazol-1-yl]ethanamine
- CAS Number: 95282-00-1
- PubChem CID: 162623683
- ChemSpider: 128917868
- UNII: WR262T3N9P

Chemical and physical data
- Formula: C_{21}H_{26}N_{4}O_{2}
- Molar mass: 366.465 g·mol^{−1}
- 3D model (JSmol): Interactive image
- SMILES: CCN(CC)CCN1C2=C(C=C(C=C2)[N+](=O)[O-])N=C1CC3=CC=C(C=C3)C
- InChI: InChI=1S/C21H26N4O2/c1-4-23(5-2)12-13-24-20-11-10-18(25(26)27)15-19(20)22-21(24)14-17-8-6-16(3)7-9-17/h6-11,15H,4-5,12-14H2,1-3H3; Key:XGHTZJUKJYZDSW-UHFFFAOYSA-N

Menitazene (methylnitazene) is a benzimidazole derivative which has opioid effects and has been sold as a designer drug. It is considerably less potent than most of the "nitazene" group of opioids which have been sold on the illicit market, but still has around ten times the potency of morphine.

== See also ==
- Clonitazene
- Metonitazene
- Propylnitazene
- List of benzimidazole opioids
