= Α'-Methyletonitazene =

α'-Methyletonitazene
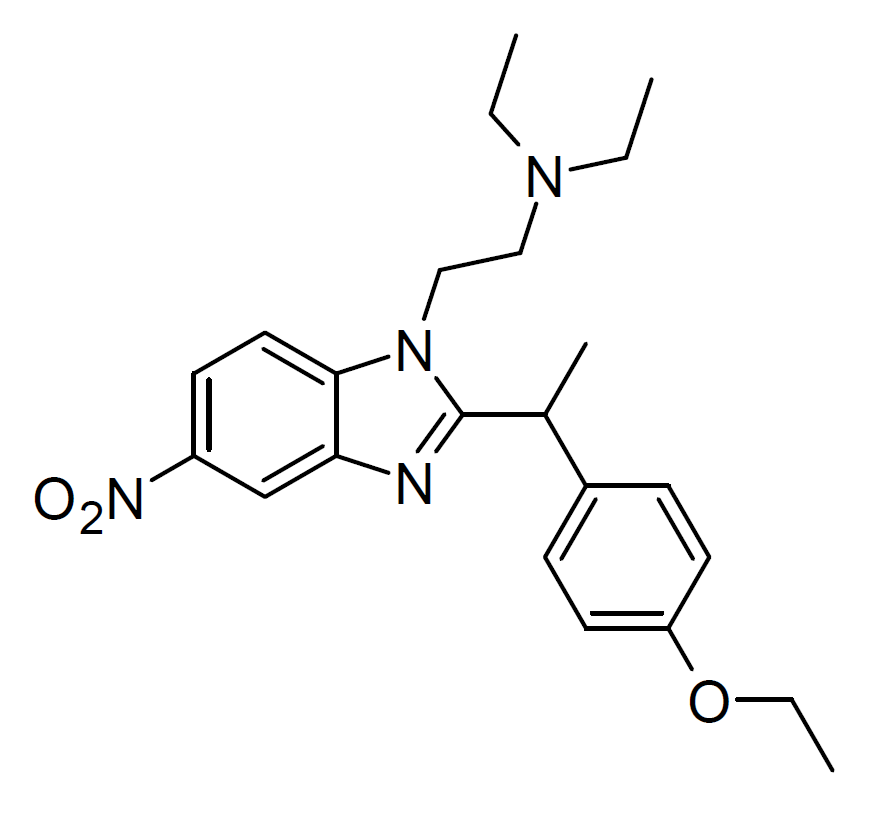

Identifiers
- IUPAC name: N,N-diethyl-2-{2-[1-(4-ethoxyphenyl)ethyl]-5-nitro-1H-1,3-benzimidazol-1-yl}ethan-1-amine

Chemical and physical data
- Formula: C_{23}H_{30}N_{4}O_{3}
- Molar mass: 410.518 g·mol^{−1}
- 3D model (JSmol): Interactive image
- SMILES: CC(c1nc2cc(ccc2n1CCN(CC)CC)[N+](=O)[O-])c1ccc(OCC)cc1
- InChI: InChI=1S/C23H30N4O3/c1-5-25(6-2)14-15-26-22-13-10-19(27(28)29)16-21(22)24-23(26)17(4)18-8-11-20(12-9-18)30-7-3/h8-13,16-17H,5-7,14-15H2,1-4H3; Key:DCJZWHORRZCIKH-UHFFFAOYSA-N

α'-Methyletonitazene is a benzimidazole derivative which is an opioid designer drug. It was the most potent compound identified in a series of etonitazene analogues tested for structure-activity relationship studies on this emerging class of designer drugs, though was still slightly less potent than etonitazene itself.

== See also ==
- Etonitazepyne
- Isotonitazene
- List of benzimidazole opioids
