= Flunitazene =

Designer drug with opioid effects

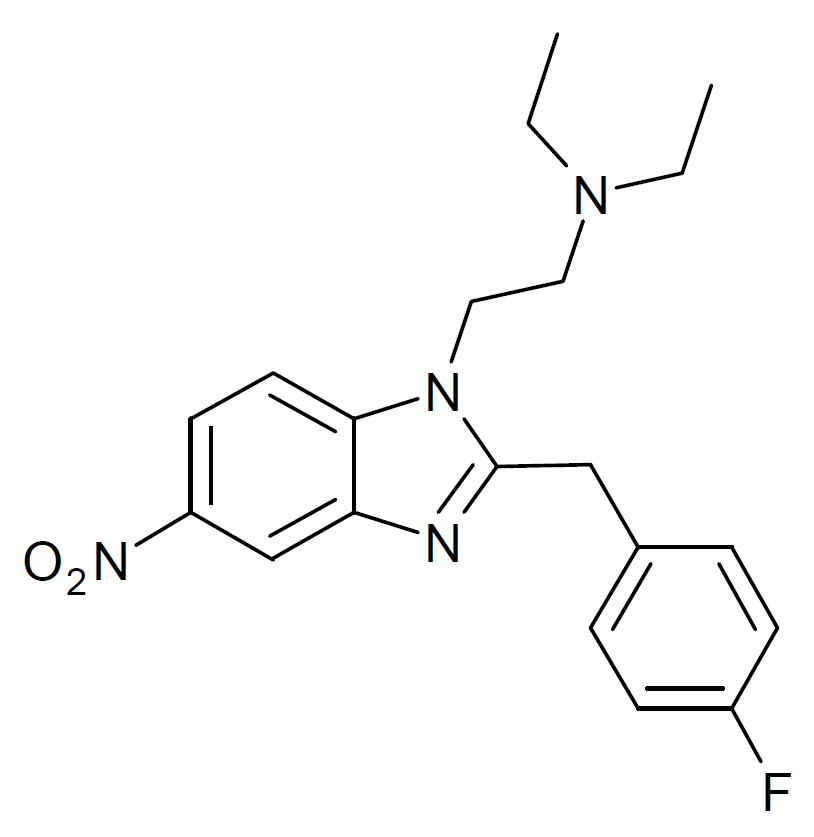

Legal status
- Legal status: US: Schedule I

Identifiers
- IUPAC name: N,N-diethyl-2-[2-[(4-fluorophenyl)methyl]-5-nitrobenzimidazol-1-yl]ethanamine
- CAS Number: 2249-36-7
- PubChem CID: 156588967
- ChemSpider: 129433227
- UNII: LQS4YF6P6L
- ChEBI: CHEBI:234366

Chemical and physical data
- Formula: C_{20}H_{23}FN_{4}O_{2}
- Molar mass: 370.428 g·mol^{−1}
- 3D model (JSmol): Interactive image
- SMILES: CCN(CC)CCN1C2=C(C=C(C=C2)[N+](=O)[O-])N=C1CC3=CC=C(C=C3)F
- InChI: InChI=1S/C20H23FN4O2/c1-3-23(4-2)11-12-24-19-10-9-17(25(26)27)14-18(19)22-20(24)13-15-5-7-16(21)8-6-15/h5-10,14H,3-4,11-13H2,1-2H3; Key:ZTWHIDCAGRMKTC-UHFFFAOYSA-N

Flunitazene (Fluonitazene) is a benzimidazole derivative with opioid effects, first developed in the 1950s as part of the research that led to better-known compounds such as etonitazene. It is one of the least potent derivatives from this class to have appeared as a designer drug, with only around the same potency as morphine, but nevertheless has been sold since around 2020, and has been linked to numerous drug overdose cases.

== See also ==
- Clonitazene
- Isotonitazene
- List of benzimidazole opioids
