= C21H26N4O3 =

The molecular formula C_{21}H_{26}N_{4}O_{3} (molar mass: 382.464 g/mol) may refer to:

- N-Desethylprotonitazene
- N-Desethylisotonitazene, a designer drug with opiod effects
- Metonitazene, an analgesic compound
