= Kush (drug) =

Recreational drug

Kush is a synthetic cannabinoid-like drug. Its first use was first reported around 2018–2019, and it became increasingly prevalent in Sierra Leone from 2021 onwards, particularly among young people.

== Composition ==
The composition of Kush was initially unclear, but it was described as a synthetic cannabinoid-like drug that is made from a combination of different chemicals and plants. Early anecdotal reports suggested the active components to be opioids such as fentanyl and tramadol, possibly mixed with other drugs such as methamphetamine, along with chemicals such as acetone and formaldehyde, "rat poison", and allegedly even ground-up human bones sourced from graveyards. However, subsequent laboratory analysis of Kush samples has shown none of these ingredients to be present, aside from acetone and formaldehyde which are indeed used in the manufacturing process.

Instead, Kush samples were found to consist of a plant base of marshmallow, mixed with synthetic cannabinoids and/or nitazene based synthetic opioids. Some samples contained just synthetic cannabinoids, some samples contained just nitazenes, and some samples contained both types of drug. The main cannabinoid found was MDMB-4en-PINACA and in one sample also AB-CHMINACA, while the main opioids found were either protonitazene or protonitazepyne, or less commonly metonitazene.

Interviews with arrested traffickers and producers of Kush revealed that in some cases, the synthetic cannabinoids were manufactured domestically inside Sierra Leone, from imported "kits" containing tail-less precursor chemicals (similar to MDMB-5Br-INACA) which were supplied along with the appropriate precursor to add the tail to the 1-position NH, so all that had to be sourced locally were readily available chemical reagents to catalyse the reaction. The crude reaction product was then mixed directly into plant material without further purification, resulting in significant contamination with synthetic byproducts and solvent residues, believed to be responsible for some batches having strong chemical odor. Some producers of Kush did report also incorporating tramadol diverted from medical sources into batches of Kush, but none of the samples that were analysed were found to contain tramadol.

== Characteristics ==
Kush is produced and distributed by criminal gangs. Kush has led to reports of self-harm, sexual assault and violence. It can cause the users to enter a catatonic, zombie-like state. Medical personnel in Freetown reported up to 90% of the male admissions to the central psychiatric ward were related to Kush use. In 2024, it was reported to cause a dozen deaths per week in Freetown alone.

Kush is unusual in that it commonly contains both potent synthetic cannabinoids and potent synthetic opioids, combined in the same product. It appears that for the first few years Kush was simply a synthetic cannabis product similar to those previously sold in numerous countries overseas, but from around 2022 onwards, nitazene class opioids started to be used instead of, or alongside, the synthetic cannabinoid active ingredients, resulting in an upsurge in both addiction and overdose deaths. In illicit drug markets in Europe and North America, synthetic cannabinoids and synthetic opioids have been largely separate phenomena, with synthetic cannabis products marketed to cannabis users rarely if ever containing opioids.

Synthetic opioids have primarily been marketed as "street heroin" or fake prescription opioid pills presented as "oxycontin", "vicodin" etc., and have been marketed to existing opioid users. The emergence of Kush thus represents the first example of a widely used drug product containing both types of ingredient, and is especially troubling as it was initially marketed to opioid-naive cannabis users in a region with some of the highest prevalence of recreational cannabis use in the world.

The pharmacological effects of synthetic cannabinoids and synthetic opioids are powerfully synergistic in some aspects such as sedation and potential for acute overdose, but they are not interchangeable and do not substitute for each other in dependent individuals. Habitual users of Kush can thus develop a dependence on both opioids and cannabinoids simultaneously, and if they consume a batch which contains only one of these ingredients they can become highly intoxicated yet still exhibit withdrawal syndrome and cravings for the other component that is missing. These features have caused Kush addiction to be especially challenging to manage and treat.

== Geographical distribution ==
While Kush initially emerged in Sierra Leone and is still most commonly encountered there, it has subsequently spread across West Africa, and by 2024 use of Kush had become widespread in Liberia, Guinea, Guinea-Bissau and the Gambia, and had been reported to a lesser extent in Senegal, Ghana, Nigeria and Ivory Coast. Similar products containing a mixture of nitazene opioids and MDMB-4en-PINACA have also been found in Brazil, first appearing in around 2022–2023.
