= C20H24N4O3 =

The molecular formula C_{20}H_{24}N_{4}O_{3} (molar mass: 368.437 g/mol) may refer to:

- N-Desethyletonitazene
- N,N-Dimethyletonitazene
