= C24H32N4O3 =

The molecular formula C_{24}H_{32}N_{4}O_{3} (molar mass: 424.55 g/mol) may refer to:

- Butonitazene
- Secbutonitazene
