= C22H26N4O3 =

The molecular formula C_{22}H_{26}N_{4}O_{3} (molar mass: 394.48 g/mol) may refer to:

- Ethyleneoxynitazene
- Etonitazepyne
