= Methionitazene =

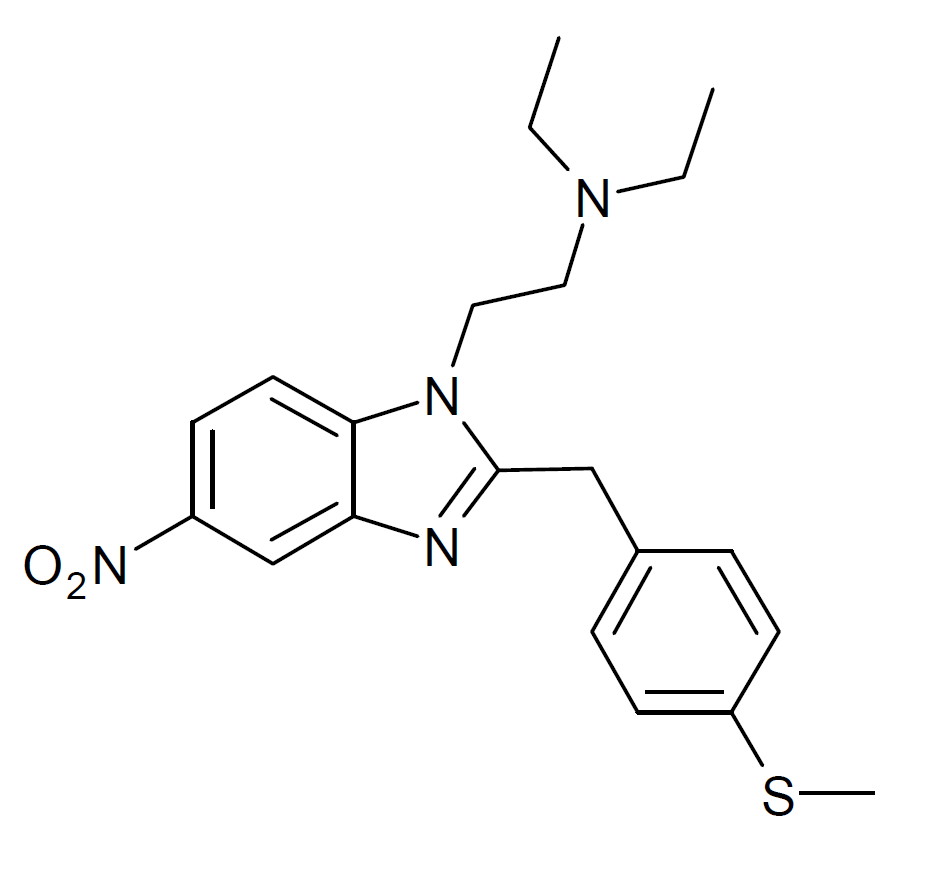

Identifiers
- IUPAC name: N,N-diethyl-2-[2-[(4-methylsulfanylphenyl)methyl]-5-nitrobenzimidazol-1-yl]ethanamine
- CAS Number: 102471-37-4
- PubChem CID: 162623790
- ChemSpider: 129433071
- UNII: JW27AV47BF

Chemical and physical data
- Formula: C_{21}H_{26}N_{4}O_{2}S
- Molar mass: 398.53 g·mol^{−1}
- 3D model (JSmol): Interactive image
- SMILES: CCN(CC)CCN1C2=C(C=C(C=C2)[N+](=O)[O-])N=C1CC3=CC=C(C=C3)SC
- InChI: InChI=1S/C21H26N4O2S/c1-4-23(5-2)12-13-24-20-11-8-17(25(26)27)15-19(20)22-21(24)14-16-6-9-18(28-3)10-7-16/h6-11,15H,4-5,12-14H2,1-3H3; Key:ODVCNMQMXRKHGM-UHFFFAOYSA-N

Methionitazene (methylthionitazene) is a benzimidazole derivative which is an opioid designer drug. It was invented in the late 1950s as part of the original research into the "nitazene" group of opioids by CIBA in Switzerland, but as with all compounds from this group was never developed for legitimate medical uses. In early studies on mice, it was found to be around half the potency of the methoxy analogue metonitazene with around 50 times the analgesic potency of morphine, and significantly more potent than the ethylthio homologue, but more recent research using modern techniques found methionitazene and metonitazene to have a similar EC_{50} in vitro despite the methoxy compound having a stronger binding affinity at the mu opioid receptor.

== See also ==
- List of benzimidazole opioids
