= Etoacetazene =

Chemical compound

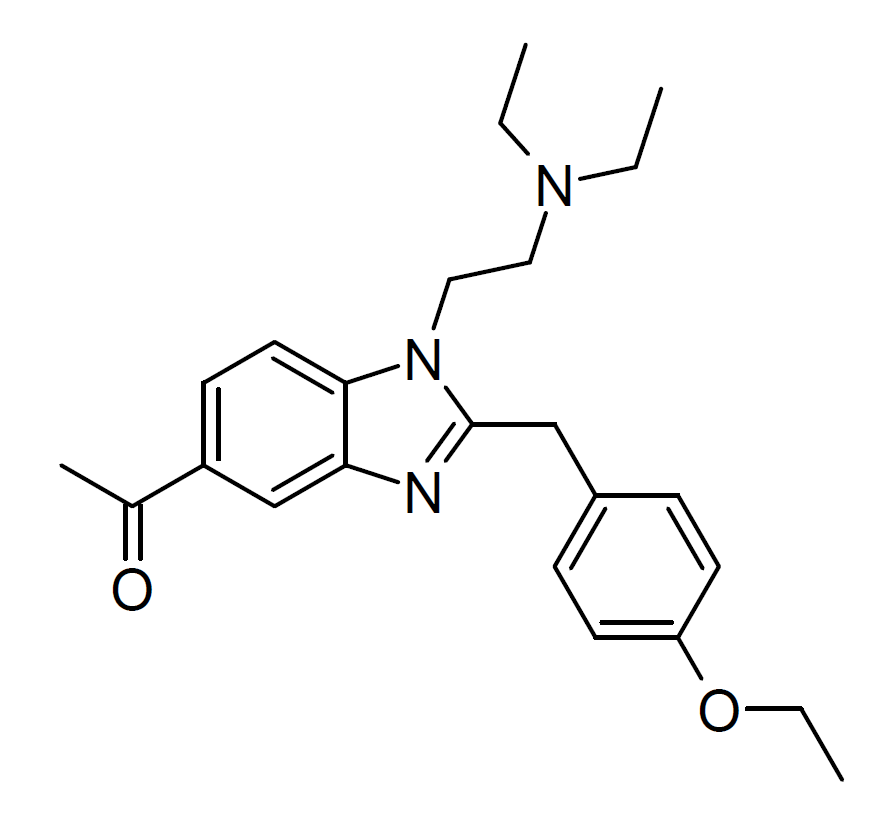

Identifiers
- IUPAC name: 1-[1-[2-(diethylamino)ethyl]-2-[(4-ethoxyphenyl)methyl]benzimidazol-5-yl]ethanone
- CAS Number: 13406-60-5
- PubChem CID: 25957
- ChemSpider: 24182
- ChEMBL: ChEMBL4468889
- CompTox Dashboard (EPA): DTXSID10158480

Chemical and physical data
- Formula: C_{24}H_{31}N_{3}O_{2}
- Molar mass: 393.531 g·mol^{−1}
- 3D model (JSmol): Interactive image
- SMILES: CCN(CC)CCN1C2=C(C=C(C=C2)C(=O)C)N=C1CC3=CC=C(C=C3)OCC
- InChI: InChI=1S/C24H31N3O2/c1-5-26(6-2)14-15-27-23-13-10-20(18(4)28)17-22(23)25-24(27)16-19-8-11-21(12-9-19)29-7-3/h8-13,17H,5-7,14-16H2,1-4H3; Key:CFGBPNSLTKLAKK-UHFFFAOYSA-N

Etoacetazene (Etonitazene 5-acetyl analogue, 5-acetyldesnitroetonitazene) is a benzimidazole derivative with opioid effects, first developed in the 1950s as part of the research that led to better-known compounds such as etonitazene. It is an analogue of etonitazene where the 5-nitro (NO_{2}) group has been replaced by an acetyl (COCH_{3}) group. It is described as having "reduced but still significant" potency compared to etonitazene itself. This compound was also tested as part of a series of cannabinoid receptor 2 agonists, and was found to be active though with fairly low potency of 960 nM at CB_{2}, and negligible activity at CB_{1}.

== See also ==
- Etocyanazene
- Etodesnitazene
- Etomethazene
- MCHB-1
- List of benzimidazole opioids
