= Etomethazene =

Chemical compound

Identifiers
- IUPAC name: 2-[(4-ethoxyphenyl)methyl]-N,N-diethyl-5-methyl-1H-benzimidazole-1-ethanamine
- CAS Number: 95293-25-7
- PubChem CID: 168310446
- ChemSpider: 128918644
- UNII: K2MJV9DE7T

Chemical and physical data
- Formula: C_{23}H_{31}N_{3}O
- Molar mass: 365.521 g·mol^{−1}
- 3D model (JSmol): Interactive image
- SMILES: CCOc3ccc(Cc2nc1cc(C)ccc1n2CCN(CC)CC)cc3
- InChI: InChI=1S/C23H31N3O/c1-5-25(6-2)14-15-26-22-13-8-18(4)16-21(22)24-23(26)17-19-9-11-20(12-10-19)27-7-3/h8-13,16H,5-7,14-15,17H2,1-4H3; Key:ZARKNPABJGEAOQ-UHFFFAOYSA-N

Etomethazene (5-methyldesnitroetonitazene, 5-methyl etodesnitazene, Eto) is a benzimidazole derivative with opioid effects which has been sold as a designer drug over the internet since 2022, first being definitively identified in Sweden in January 2023. It is an analogue of etonitazene where the nitro (NO_{2}) group has been replaced by a methyl (CH_{3}) group. It is less potent than etonitazene itself but still has around twice the potency of fentanyl. Etomethazene has a relatively short duration of action of about 120 min.

== See also ==
- Etoacetazene
- Etocyanazene
- Etodesnitazene
- Etonitazepyne
- Isotonitazene
- Metonitazene
- List of benzimidazole opioids
