= Butonitazene =

Chemical compound

Legal status
- Legal status: BR: Class F1 (Prohibited narcotics); DE: Anlage II (Authorized trade only, not prescriptible); UK: Under Psychoactive Substances Act; US: Schedule I

Identifiers
- IUPAC name: 2-[(4-Butoxyphenyl)methyl]-5-nitro-1-(2-diethylaminoethyl)benzimidazole
- CAS Number: 95810-54-1
- PubChem CID: 156588955
- ChemSpider: 97091820
- UNII: C4CE9FVR7N
- ChEBI: CHEBI:234364

Chemical and physical data
- Formula: C_{24}H_{32}N_{4}O_{3}
- Molar mass: 424.545 g·mol^{−1}
- 3D model (JSmol): Interactive image
- SMILES: CCCCOC1=CC=C(C=C1)CC2=NC3=C(N2CCN(CC)CC)C=CC(=C3)[N+](=O)[O-]
- InChI: InChI=1S/C24H32N4O3/c1-4-7-16-31-21-11-8-19(9-12-21)17-24-25-22-18-20(28(29)30)10-13-23(22)27(24)15-14-26(5-2)6-3/h8-13,18H,4-7,14-17H2,1-3H3; Key:UZZPOLCDCVWLAZ-UHFFFAOYSA-N

Butonitazene is a benzimidazole derivative with opioid effects, which has been sold over the internet as a designer drug. It has relatively low potency compared to many related compounds, and has generally been encountered as a component of mixtures with other substances rather than in its pure form. However, it is still several times the potency of morphine and has been implicated in several cases of drug overdose. Butonitazene is a Schedule I drug in the US, along with several related compounds.

== See also ==
- Butodesnitazene
- Etonitazene
- Isotonitazene
- Metonitazene
- Protonitazene
- Secbutonitazene
