= Secbutonitazene =

Chemical compound

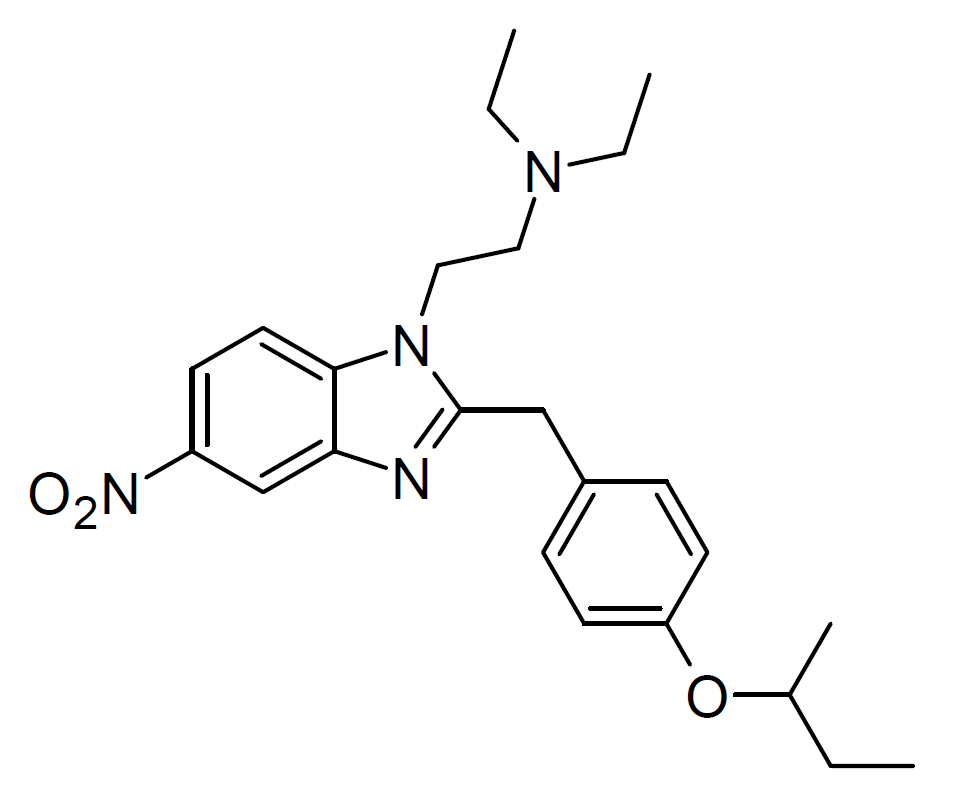

Identifiers
- IUPAC name: 2-{[4-(but-2-yl)oxyphenyl]methyl}-5-nitro-1-(2-pyrrolidin-1-ylethyl)benzimidazole
- CAS Number: 96587-76-7
- PubChem CID: 168322285

Chemical and physical data
- Formula: C_{24}H_{32}N_{4}O_{3}
- Molar mass: 424.545 g·mol^{−1}
- 3D model (JSmol): Interactive image
- SMILES: CCC(C)OC1=CC=C(C=C1)CC2=NC3=C(N2CCN(CC)CC)C=CC(=C3)[N+](=O)[O-]
- InChI: InChI=1S/C24H32N4O3/c1-5-18(4)31-21-11-8-19(9-12-21)16-24-25-22-17-20(28(29)30)10-13-23(22)27(24)15-14-26(6-2)7-3/h8-13,17-18H,5-7,14-16H2,1-4H3; Key:NOIMENQCHUDEKZ-UHFFFAOYSA-N

Secbutonitazene is a benzimidazole derivative which has been sold as a designer drug. It has opioid effects similar to related compounds, having slightly lower potency than metonitazene in vitro, but still more potent than fentanyl.

== See also ==
- Butonitazene
- Isotonitazene
- Protonitazene
- List of benzimidazole opioids
