= Propylnitazene =

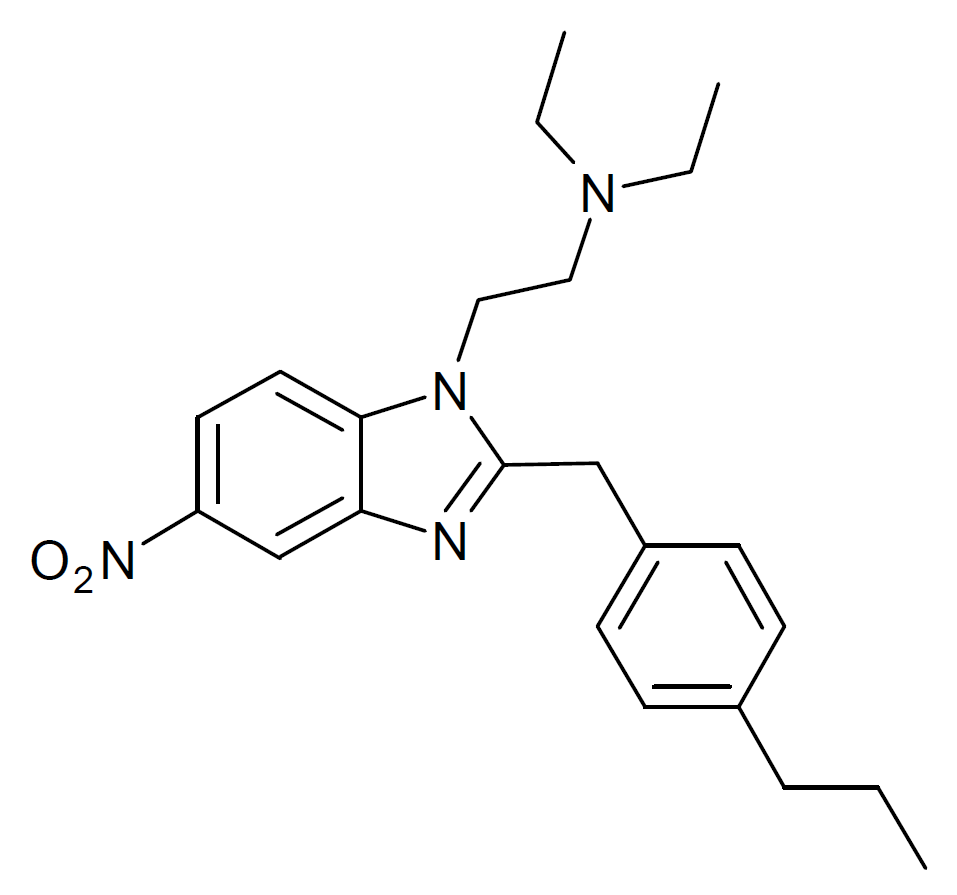

Identifiers
- IUPAC name: N,N-diethyl-2-[5-nitro-2-[(4-propylphenyl)methyl]benzimidazol-1-yl]ethanamine
- CAS Number: 700342-00-3
- PubChem CID: 162623877
- ChemSpider: 129433049
- UNII: TN458A7BPE

Chemical and physical data
- Formula: C_{23}H_{30}N_{4}O_{2}
- Molar mass: 394.519 g·mol^{−1}
- 3D model (JSmol): Interactive image
- SMILES: CCCC1=CC=C(C=C1)CC2=NC3=C(N2CCN(CC)CC)C=CC(=C3)[N+](=O)[O-]
- InChI: InChI=1S/C23H30N4O2/c1-4-7-18-8-10-19(11-9-18)16-23-24-21-17-20(27(28)29)12-13-22(21)26(23)15-14-25(5-2)6-3/h8-13,17H,4-7,14-16H2,1-3H3; Key:CCXASIRNRBHKGD-UHFFFAOYSA-N

Propylnitazene (PPZ) is a benzimidazole derivative which has opioid effects and has been sold as a designer drug. It is less potent than many of the "nitazene" group of opioids which have been sold on the illicit market, but is nevertheless a potent opioid drug with around fifty times the potency of morphine.

== See also ==
- Menitazene
- Protonitazene
- List of benzimidazole opioids
