= C23H22N2O =

The molecular formula C_{23}H_{22}N_{2}O (molar mass: 342.434 g/mol, exact mass: 342.1732 u) may refer to:

- BIM-018
- THJ-018 (SGT-17)
