= Etonitazepipne =

Benzimidazole derivative

Legal status
- Legal status: DE: NpSG (Industrial and scientific use only); UK: Under Psychoactive Substances Act

Identifiers
- IUPAC name: 2-[(4-Ethoxyphenyl)methyl]-5-nitro-1-(2-piperidin-1-ylethyl)benzimidazole
- CAS Number: 734496-28-7
- PubChem CID: 162623834
- ChemSpider: 128910072
- UNII: 7AF6EZ8PMY
- CompTox Dashboard (EPA): DTXSID401337650

Chemical and physical data
- Formula: C_{23}H_{28}N_{4}O_{3}
- Molar mass: 408.502 g·mol^{−1}
- 3D model (JSmol): Interactive image
- SMILES: CCOC1=CC=C(C=C1)CC2=NC3=C(N2CCN4CCCCC4)C=CC(=C3)[N+](=O)[O-]
- InChI: InChI=1S/C23H28N4O3/c1-2-30-20-9-6-18(7-10-20)16-23-24-21-17-19(27(28)29)8-11-22(21)26(23)15-14-25-12-4-3-5-13-25/h6-11,17H,2-5,12-16H2,1H3; Key:UMGXRAISFRUVKD-UHFFFAOYSA-N

Etonitazepipne (N-piperidino etonitazene) is a benzimidazole derivative with opioid effects around 100 times more potent than morphine, which has been sold over the internet as a designer drug.

== See also ==
- Etazene
- Etonitazepyne
- Isotonitazene
- Metonitazene
- Protonitazepyne
- List of benzimidazole opioids
