= N-Desethyletonitazene =

Chemical compound

Legal status
- Legal status: BR: Class F1 (Prohibited narcotics)

Identifiers
- IUPAC name: 2-[2-[(4-ethoxyphenyl)methyl]-5-nitrobenzimidazol-1-yl]-N-ethylethanamine
- CAS Number: 2732926-26-8
- PubChem CID: 162623580
- ChemSpider: 103835274
- UNII: QRN9B8Z285
- CompTox Dashboard (EPA): DTXSID201342217

Chemical and physical data
- Formula: C_{20}H_{24}N_{4}O_{3}
- Molar mass: 368.437 g·mol^{−1}
- 3D model (JSmol): Interactive image
- SMILES: CCNCCN1C2=C(C=C(C=C2)[N+](=O)[O-])N=C1CC3=CC=C(C=C3)OCC
- InChI: InChI=1S/C20H24N4O3/c1-3-21-11-12-23-19-10-7-16(24(25)26)14-18(19)22-20(23)13-15-5-8-17(9-6-15)27-4-2/h5-10,14,21H,3-4,11-13H2,1-2H3; Key:RESPFUMJVJRUMB-UHFFFAOYSA-N

N-Desethyletonitazene (NDE, Noretonitazene) is a benzimidazole derivative with potent opioid effects which has been sold as a designer drug. It is better known as an active metabolite of the related compound etonitazene, but has similar activity to the parent compound and has sometimes appeared as a drug of abuse in its own right, first being identified in New Zealand in 2024.

== See also ==
- N-Desethylfluornitrazene (DFNZ)
- N-Desethylisotonitazene
- Etodesnitazene
- Metonitazene
