= Emerging Drugs Network of Australia =

The Emerging Drugs Network of Australia (EDNA) is a collaborative multi-agency project to detect new psychoactive substances (NPS) across Australia and identify their clinical effects and associated harms. It is also designed to support localised drug-related early warning systems and to inform policy and decision-making processes. The project involves sharing of information between emergency department (ED) physicians, toxicologists, and state-specific forensic laboratories across the country. This allows emerging trends to be discovered, and for specific treatment measures to be developed based on objective data.

The EDNA started from research conducted at Royal Perth Hospital in collaboration with ChemCentre, initiated after a large number of patients were hospitalised after consuming a drug, which they thought was ecstasy, on New Year's Eve 2013. In 2016, two patients in the intensive care unit were found, through analysis conducted by ChemCentre forensic scientists, to have consumed a toxic synthetic drug NBOMe. A quick public health response, including a warning by Western Australian police and pictures of the capsules, is thought to have prevented serious illnesses and deaths by deterring some people from taking the drug, according to a report by Royal Perth Hospital emergency doctors David McCutcheon and Jessamine Soderstrom presented to the New South Wales Coroners Court's 2019 inquest into the drug-related deaths at music festivals.

In 2020 the program received $3.7 million in federal funding (NHMRC Ideas Grant) over five years.

== Aims ==
EDNA has three major aims:

1. To establish a common scope of analysis with high sensitivity to identify new and emerging NPS and highly toxic psychoactive substances,
2. To determine clinical patterns of toxicity associated with the illicit drugs and NPS involved in ED presentations, and how these relate to patient outcomes,
3. To support local early warning responses by sharing clinical and toxicological information across key agencies to inform public health and harm reduction policy.

== Methods ==
As of February 2026, 16 emergency departments across six states in Australia contribute to the EDNA Registry. Across each contributing state, patients presenting with severe and/or unusual clinical features consistent with recreational illicit drug or new psychoactive substance toxicity, and/or patients presenting as part of a suspected cluster of illicit drug poisonings, are identified for inclusion. Further information about eligibility criteria can be found in the published methodology paper.

Samples submitted to laboratories are tested for a broad range of substances, including synthetic cathinones, cannabinoids, synthetic opioids and other NPS. Most NPS can only be detected using specialised analytical instrumentation provided by a national network of forensic laboratories. Methods such as Liquid Chromatography Triple Quadrupole Mass Spectrometry (LCMS-QQQ), Liquid Chromatography Quadrupole Time of Flight Mass Spectrometry (LCMS-QTOF) and Gas Chromatography–Triple Quadrupole Mass Spectrometry (GCMS-QQQ), provide the capability to detect low dose–high potency drugs.

== Key Findings ==
- Exposure to "Nitazenes", detected in EDs, are mostly unintentional.
- Although novel benzodiazepine-type substances were the most common NPS detected in EDs in 2022-2023, exposure to multiple substances, including NPS and other conventional illicit drugs was very common.
- Initial results from Western Australia were published in 2023, highlighting the predominance of methylamphetamine and novel benzodiazepines within ED presentations suspected of severe or unusual illicit intoxication.
- NPS are often underreported in ED settings, likely due to unintentional exposure of such drugs.

All formal outputs published by any EDNA Investigator, including the Quarterly and Annual Reports can be found at the EDNA Google Scholar Page

Data collected from EDNA is also distributed to international data collections, including the UNODC Current NPS Threats Reports.
