= Metodesnitazene =

Chemical compound

Legal status
- Legal status: UK: Under Psychoactive Substances Act; US: Schedule I

Identifiers
- IUPAC name: N,N-diethyl-2-[2-[(4-methoxyphenyl)methyl]benzimidazol-1-yl]ethanamine
- CAS Number: 14030-77-4 1071546-40-1 (HCl)
- PubChem CID: 26412
- UNII: TTR2RT8GBY
- CompTox Dashboard (EPA): DTXSID80161305

Chemical and physical data
- Formula: C_{21}H_{27}N_{3}O
- Molar mass: 337.467 g·mol^{−1}
- 3D model (JSmol): Interactive image
- SMILES: CCN(CC)CCN1C2=CC=CC=C2N=C1CC3=CC=C(C=C3)OC
- InChI: InChI=1S/C21H27N3O/c1-4-23(5-2)14-15-24-20-9-7-6-8-19(20)22-21(24)16-17-10-12-18(25-3)13-11-17/h6-13H,4-5,14-16H2,1-3H3; Key:SFNKTTXBZXVGOH-UHFFFAOYSA-N

Metodesnitazene (also known as Metazene) is a benzimidazole derivative with opioid effects, though unlike related compounds such as metonitazene and etodesnitazene which are quite potent, metodesnitazene is only around the same potency as morphine in animal studies. It is illegal in both the US and UK.

== See also ==
- Etonitazepyne
- Isotonitazene
- List of benzimidazole opioids
