= BIM-018 =

Chemical compound

Legal status
- Legal status: CA: Schedule II

Identifiers
- IUPAC name: 2-(naphthalene-1-carbonyl)-1-pentyl-1H-1,3-benzodiazole
- CAS Number: 2316839-70-8
- PubChem CID: 124519300
- ChemSpider: 29763750
- UNII: 2FNW3VE8P9
- CompTox Dashboard (EPA): DTXSID901017182

Chemical and physical data
- Formula: C_{23}H_{22}N_{2}O
- Molar mass: 342.442 g·mol^{−1}
- 3D model (JSmol): Interactive image
- SMILES: CCCCCn1c2ccccc2nc1C(=O)c1cccc2c1cccc2
- InChI: InChI=1S/C23H22N2O/c1-2-3-8-16-25-21-15-7-6-14-20(21)24-23(25)22(26)19-13-9-11-17-10-4-5-12-18(17)19/h4-7,9-15H,2-3,8,16H2,1H3; Key:ZJWSSWFQIOEVCU-UHFFFAOYSA-N

BIM-018 is a synthetic cannabinoid that is the benzimidazole analog of JWH-018. It is presumed to be a potent agonist of the CB_{2} receptor and has been sold online as a designer drug.

Related benzimidazole derivatives have been reported to be highly selective agonists for the CB_{2} receptor.

== See also ==
- AM-2201
- AZD-1940
- AZ-11713908
- FUBIMINA
- MCHB-1
- THJ-018
- THJ-2201
