= Isotocyanozene =

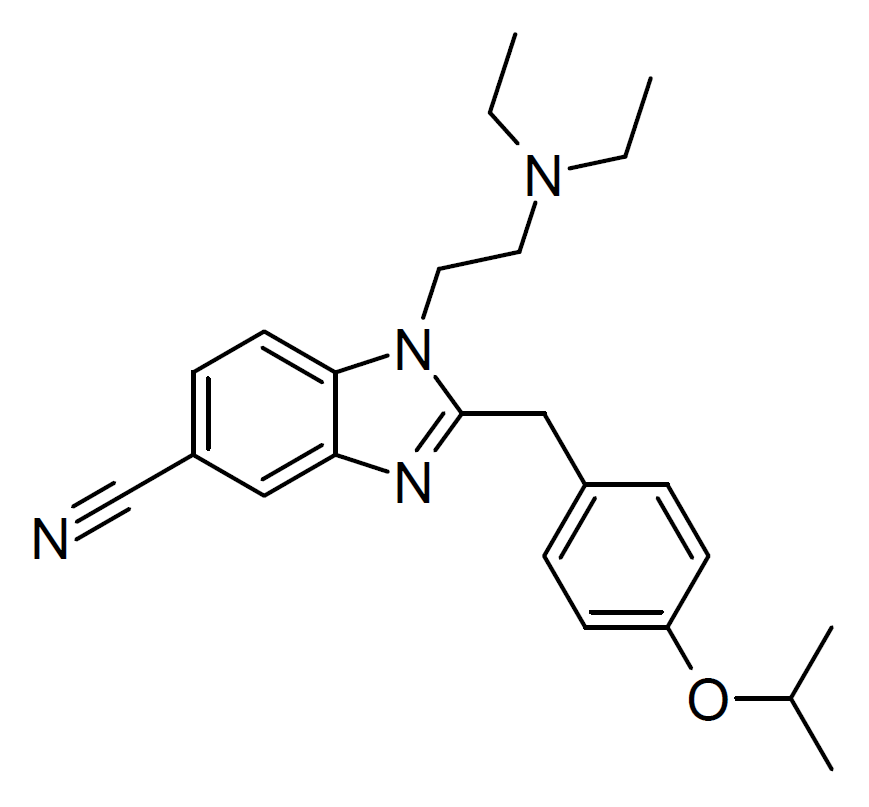

Identifiers
- IUPAC name: 1-[2-(diethylamino)ethyl]-2-[(4-prop-2-yloxyphenyl)methyl]benzimidazole-5-carbonitrile

Chemical and physical data
- Formula: C_{24}H_{30}N_{4}O
- Molar mass: 390.531 g·mol^{−1}
- 3D model (JSmol): Interactive image
- SMILES: CC(C)Oc1ccc(cc1)Cc1nc2cc(ccc2n1CCN(CC)CC)C#N
- InChI: InChI=InChI=1S/C24H30N4O/c1-5-27(6-2)13-14-28-23-12-9-20(17-25)15-22(23)26-24(28)16-19-7-10-21(11-8-19)29-18(3)4/h7-12,15,18H,5-6,13-14,16H2,1-4H3; Key:PCHKHUKJPIKAGU-UHFFFAOYSA-N

Isotocyanozene (5-cyano-isotodesnitazene) is a benzimidazole opioid analogue of isotonitazene which has been sold as a designer drug. It was first characterised by the drug checking service CanTEST, in September 2025 as an expected 'opioid' sample, and then later as an expected 'benzodiazepine' sample. Its μ-opioid in vitro activity is somewhat lower than that of fentanyl, but it still shows significant opioid activity. Following identification in human biological samples, isotocyanozene has been described to have opioid effects.

== See also ==
- Etomethazene
- Isotonitazene
- List of benzimidazole opioids
