= MCHB-1 =

Chemical compound

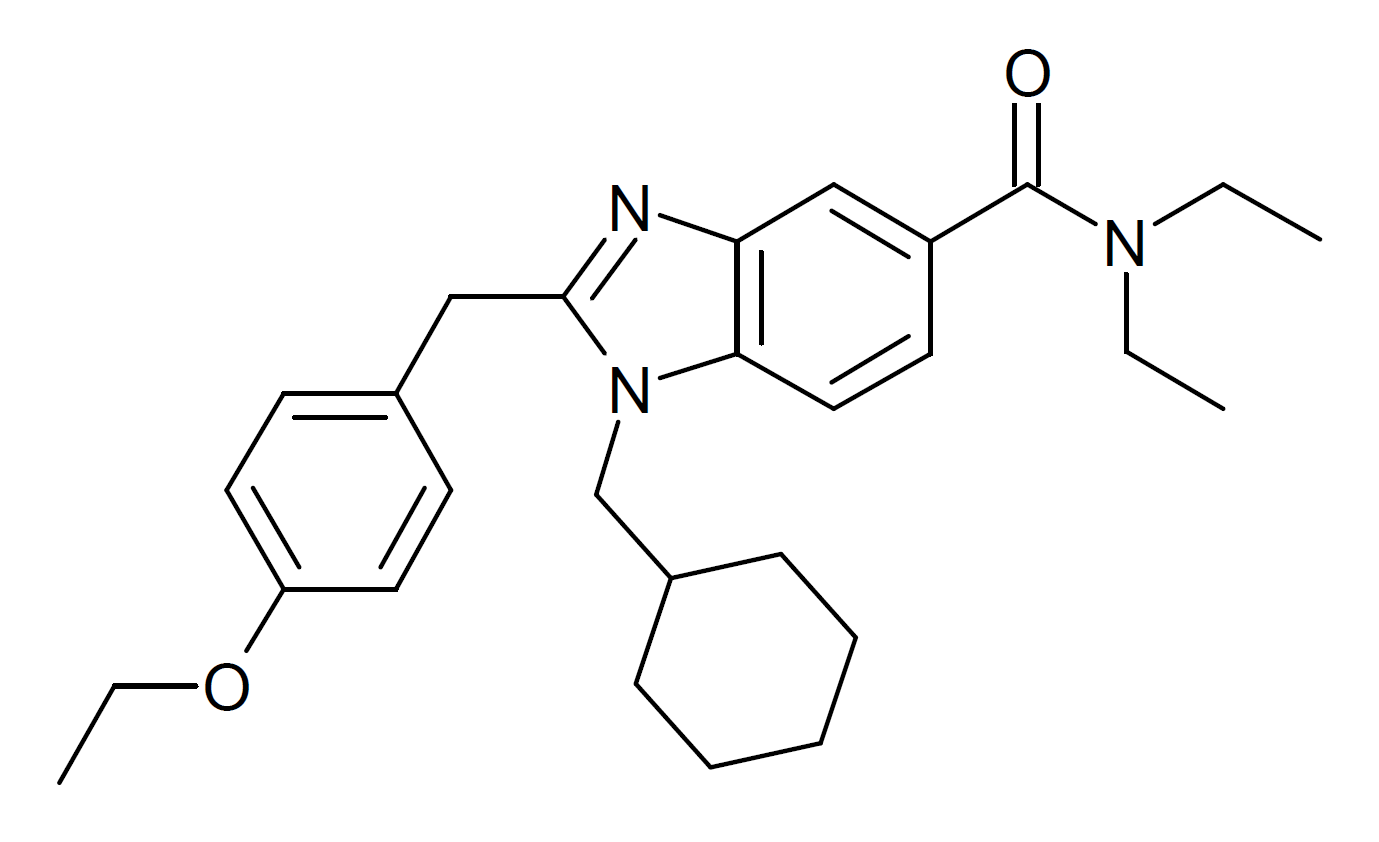

Identifiers
- IUPAC name: 2-(4-ethoxybenzyl)-1-(cyclohexylmethyl)-N,N-diethyl-1H-benzo[d]imidazole-5-carboxamide
- CAS Number: 1046140-32-2
- PubChem CID: 44561533
- ChemSpider: 23330111
- UNII: W8QNY2T4YC
- ChEMBL: ChEMBL470965
- CompTox Dashboard (EPA): DTXSID501336524

Chemical and physical data
- Formula: C_{28}H_{37}N_{3}O_{2}
- Molar mass: 447.623 g·mol^{−1}
- 3D model (JSmol): Interactive image
- SMILES: CCN(CC)C(=O)C1=CC2=C(C=C1)N(C(=N2)CC3=CC=C(C=C3)OCC)CC4CCCCC4
- InChI: InChI=1S/C28H37N3O2/c1-4-30(5-2)28(32)23-14-17-26-25(19-23)29-27(31(26)20-22-10-8-7-9-11-22)18-21-12-15-24(16-13-21)33-6-3/h12-17,19,22H,4-11,18,20H2,1-3H3; Key:WRVZBXHTUOPQJS-UHFFFAOYSA-N

MCHB-1 is a benzimidazole derived drug which was researched as an analgesic but never developed for medical use. It acts as a potent agonist of the CB_{2} receptor, with an EC_{50} of 0.52nM at CB_{2}, and ~30x selectivity over CB_{1} (Ki of 110nM at CB_{1} vs 3.7nM at CB_{2}). It has been sold online as a designer drug, first being identified in Germany in December 2013.

== See also ==
- AZD1940
- AZ-11713908
- BIM-018
- Etazen
- Etoacetazene
