= N,N-Dimethyletonitazene =

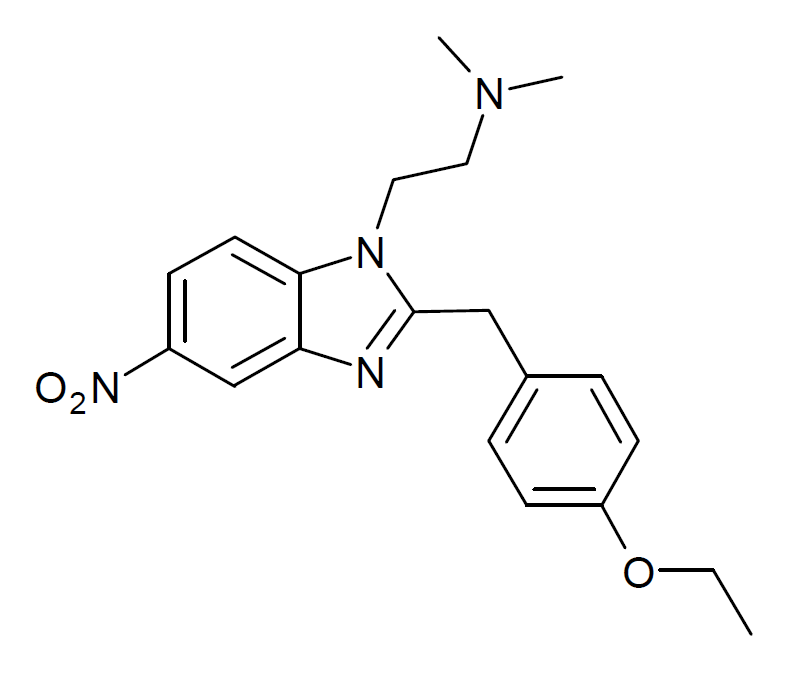

Identifiers
- IUPAC name: 2-[2-[(4-ethoxyphenyl)methyl]-5-nitrobenzimidazol-1-yl]-N,N-dimethylethanamine
- CAS Number: 714190-52-0
- PubChem CID: 67089584
- UNII: K9WBE24PY7

Chemical and physical data
- Formula: C_{20}H_{24}N_{4}O_{3}
- Molar mass: 368.437 g·mol^{−1}
- 3D model (JSmol): Interactive image
- SMILES: CCOC1=CC=C(C=C1)CC2=NC3=C(N2CCN(C)C)C=CC(=C3)[N+](=O)[O-]
- InChI: InChI=1S/C20H24N4O3/c1-4-27-17-8-5-15(6-9-17)13-20-21-18-14-16(24(25)26)7-10-19(18)23(20)12-11-22(2)3/h5-10,14H,4,11-13H2,1-3H3; Key:MYLQWWDDZNZULX-UHFFFAOYSA-N

N,N-Dimethyletonitazene is an opioid analgesic drug which has been sold as a designer drug, first detected in Latvia in May 2024, and subsequently identified in China. It is far less potent than etonitazene, but still has a potency some 20x that of morphine.
