= Clonitazene =

Opioid analgesic

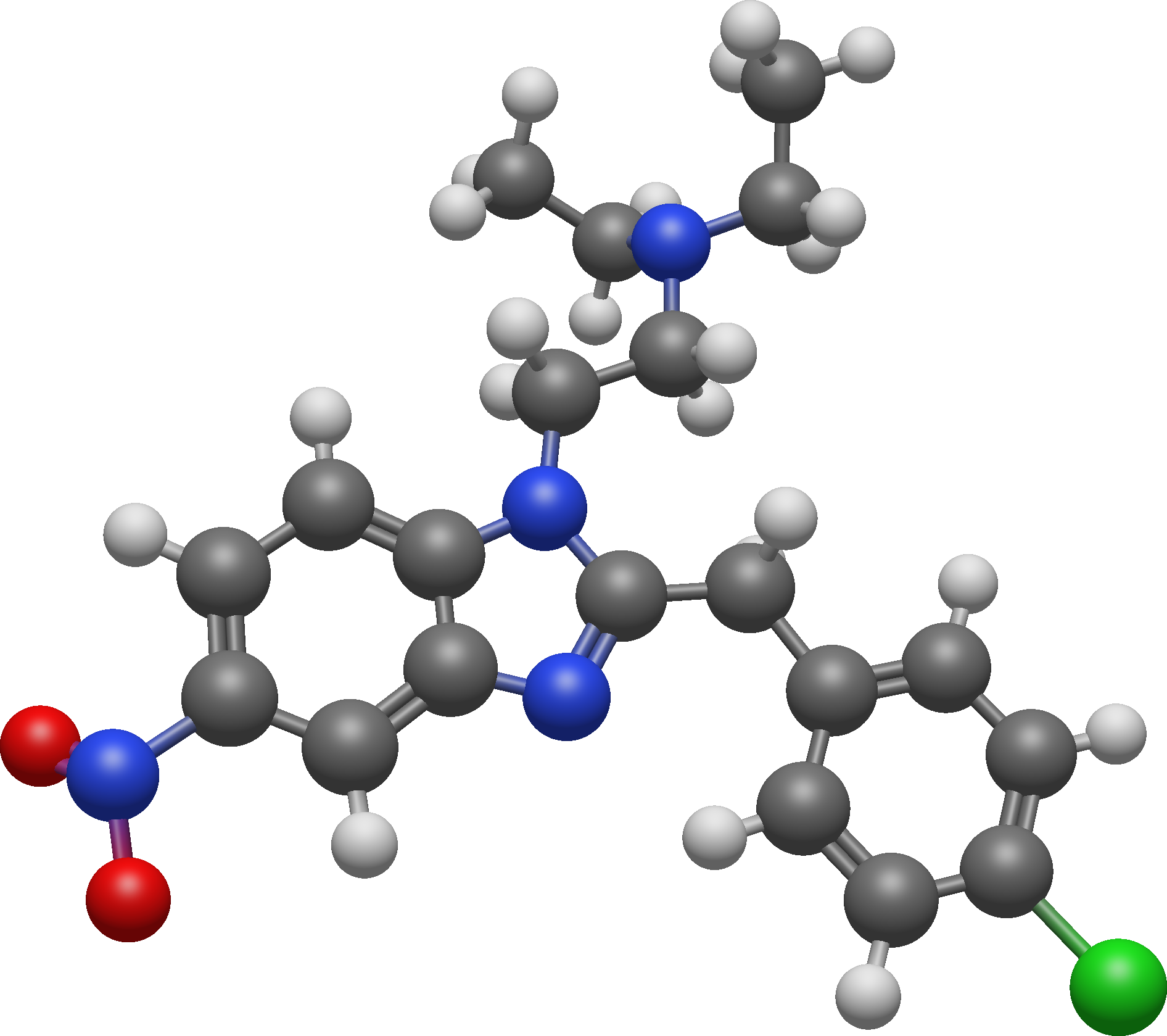

Clinical data
- Other names: Clonitazene
- ATC code: none

Legal status
- Legal status: BR: Class A1 (Narcotic drugs); CA: Schedule I; DE: Anlage I (Authorized scientific use only); UK: Class A; US: Schedule I

Identifiers
- IUPAC name: 2-[2-[(4-Chlorophenyl)methyl]-5-nitrobenzimidazol-1-yl]-N,N-diethylethanamine
- CAS Number: 3861-76-5
- PubChem CID: 62528
- DrugBank: DB01523
- ChemSpider: 56301
- UNII: S90R21A2V2
- KEGG: D12668
- ChEMBL: ChEMBL2104616
- CompTox Dashboard (EPA): DTXSID90191931

Chemical and physical data
- Formula: C_{20}H_{23}ClN_{4}O_{2}
- Molar mass: 386.88 g·mol^{−1}
- 3D model (JSmol): Interactive image
- SMILES: [O-][N+](=O)c3ccc1c(nc(n1CCN(CC)CC)Cc2ccc(Cl)cc2)c3
- InChI: InChI=1S/C20H23ClN4O2/c1-3-23(4-2)11-12-24-19-10-9-17(25(26)27)14-18(19)22-20(24)13-15-5-7-16(21)8-6-15/h5-10,14H,3-4,11-13H2,1-2H3; Key:GPZLDQAEBHTMPG-UHFFFAOYSA-N

Clonitazene is an opioid analgesic of approximately three times the potency of morphine. It is in the nitazene family of benzimidazoles related to etonitazene, an opioid of significantly higher potency. Clonitazene is not currently marketed. It is a controlled substance; in the United States it is a Schedule I Narcotic controlled substance with a DEA ACSCN of 9612 and an established manufacturing quota of 25 grams for 2022.

== See also ==
- Flunitazene
