= Protonitazene =

Chemical compound

Legal status
- Legal status: BR: Class F1 (Prohibited narcotics); DE: Anlage II (Authorized trade only, not prescriptible); UK: Under Psychoactive Substances Act; US: Schedule I

Identifiers
- IUPAC name: N,N-diethyl-2-[5-nitro-2-[(4-propoxyphenyl)methyl]benzimidazol-1-yl]ethanamine
- CAS Number: 95958-84-2
- PubChem CID: 156589001
- UNII: 4A6RZQ7M2V
- KEGG: C22683
- ChEBI: CHEBI:234363
- CompTox Dashboard (EPA): DTXSID301342658

Chemical and physical data
- Formula: C_{23}H_{30}N_{4}O_{3}
- Molar mass: 410.518 g·mol^{−1}
- 3D model (JSmol): Interactive image
- SMILES: CCCOC1=CC=C(C=C1)CC2=NC3=C(N2CCN(CC)CC)C=CC(=C3)[N+](=O)[O-]
- InChI: InChI=1S/C23H30N4O3/c1-4-15-30-20-10-7-18(8-11-20)16-23-24-21-17-19(27(28)29)9-12-22(21)26(23)14-13-25(5-2)6-3/h7-12,17H,4-6,13-16H2,1-3H3; Key:SJHUJFHOXYDSJY-UHFFFAOYSA-N

Protonitazene is a benzimidazole derivative with potent opioid effects which has been sold over the internet as a designer drug since 2019, and has been identified in various European countries, as well as Canada, the US and Australia. It has been linked to numerous cases of drug overdose, and is a Schedule I drug in the US.

It was developed by a Swiss pharmaceutical company in the 1950s as an alternative to morphine, but was never adopted due to severe side effects.

== See also ==
- Etonitazene
- Isotonitazene
- Metonitazene
- Propylnitazene
- Secbutonitazene
