= Etodesnitazene =

Chemical compound

Desnitroetonitazene

Legal status
- Legal status: BR: Class F1 (Prohibited narcotics); DE: Anlage II (Authorized trade only, not prescriptible); UK: Class A; US: Schedule I

Identifiers
- IUPAC name: 2-[2-[(4-Ethoxyphenyl)methyl]benzimidazol-1-yl]-N,N-diethylethanamine
- CAS Number: 14030-76-3
- PubChem CID: 149797386
- ChemSpider: 128909207
- UNII: H7YW5L26CS
- KEGG: C22827
- ChEBI: CHEBI:234368
- CompTox Dashboard (EPA): DTXSID601336496

Chemical and physical data
- Formula: C_{22}H_{29}N_{3}O
- Molar mass: 351.494 g·mol^{−1}
- 3D model (JSmol): Interactive image
- SMILES: CCN(CC)CCN1C2=CC=CC=C2N=C1CC3=CC=C(C=C3)OCC
- InChI: InChI=1S/C22H29N3O/c1-4-24(5-2)15-16-25-21-10-8-7-9-20(21)23-22(25)17-18-11-13-19(14-12-18)26-6-3/h7-14H,4-6,15-17H2,1-3H3; Key:BMLPNUNXHUGDOI-UHFFFAOYSA-N

Etodesnitazene (also known as desnitroetonitazene, etazen, etazene, and etazone) is a benzimidazole-derived opioid analgesic drug, which was originally developed in the late 1950s alongside etonitazene and a range of related derivatives. It is many times less potent than etonitazene itself, but still 70 times more potent than morphine in animal studies. Corresponding analogues where the N,N-diethyl group is replaced by piperidine or pyrrolidine rings also retain significant activity (10 times and 20 times morphine, respectively). Etodesnitazene has been sold as a designer drug, first being identified in both Poland and Finland in March 2020.

== Legal Status ==
=== United Kingdom ===
Since 15 January 2025 it is covered by the UK's generic definition on 2-benzyl benzimidazole derived opioids because it contains the 2-(2-benzyl-benzimidazol-1-yl)ethanamine backbone with only the following modification:

- The phenyl ring of the benzyl system is substituted by an alkoxy group containing two carbon atoms.

== See also ==
- Brorphine
- Etonitazepyne
- Etoacetazene
- Etocyanazene
- Etomethazene
- Isotonitazene
- Metonitazene
- Metodesnitazene
- Protodesnitazene
- MCHB-1
- List of benzimidazole opioids
