= Etonitazepyne =

Chemical compound

Legal status
- Legal status: BR: Class F1 (Prohibited narcotics); DE: Anlage II (Authorized trade only, not prescriptible); UK: Under Psychoactive Substances Act; US: Schedule I

Identifiers
- IUPAC name: 2-[(4-Ethoxyphenyl)methyl]-5-nitro-1-(2-pyrrolidin-1-ylethyl)benzimidazole
- CAS Number: 2785346-75-8
- PubChem CID: 155804760
- ChemSpider: 103835282
- UNII: 8HY67JQ9ZH
- KEGG: C22701
- CompTox Dashboard (EPA): DTXSID401336921

Chemical and physical data
- Formula: C_{22}H_{26}N_{4}O_{3}
- Molar mass: 394.475 g·mol^{−1}
- 3D model (JSmol): Interactive image
- SMILES: [O-][N+](=O)c1cc2nc(Cc3ccc(OCC)cc3)n(CCN3CCCC3)c2cc1
- InChI: InChI=1S/C22H26N4O3/c1-2-29-19-8-5-17(6-9-19)15-22-23-20-16-18(26(27)28)7-10-21(20)25(22)14-13-24-11-3-4-12-24/h5-10,16H,2-4,11-15H2,1H3; Key:LQZWZCJCEPUKCJ-UHFFFAOYSA-N

Etonitazepyne (N-pyrrolidino etonitazene) is a benzimidazole derivative with potent opioid effects which has been sold over the internet as a designer drug and linked to numerous cases of overdose.

== See also ==
- Etazene
- Etonitazene
- Etonitazepipne
- Isotonitazene
- Metonitazene
- Protonitazepyne
