= Isotonitazene =

Chemical compound

Clinical data
- Routes of administration: By mouth, nasal spray, e-vape

Legal status
- Legal status: BR: Class F1 (Prohibited narcotics); DE: Anlage II (Authorized trade only, not prescriptible); UK: Under Psychoactive Substances Act; US: Schedule I; Illegal in Belgium, Finland and Sweden

Identifiers
- IUPAC name: N,N-diethyl-2-[2-[(4-isopropoxyphenyl)methyl]-5-nitro-benzimidazol-1-yl]ethanamine
- CAS Number: 14188-81-9
- PubChem CID: 145721979
- ChemSpider: 73962294
- UNII: ZFY1ZBQ8AV
- KEGG: C22725
- ChEBI: CHEBI:234360
- CompTox Dashboard (EPA): DTXSID201126188

Chemical and physical data
- Formula: C_{23}H_{30}N_{4}O_{3}
- Molar mass: 410.518 g·mol^{−1}
- 3D model (JSmol): Interactive image
- SMILES: CCN(CCn1c(Cc2ccc(cc2)OC(C)C)nc2c1ccc(c2)N(=O)=O)CC
- InChI: InChI=1S/C23H30N4O3/c1-5-25(6-2)13-14-26-22-12-9-19(27(28)29)16-21(22)24-23(26)15-18-7-10-20(11-8-18)30-17(3)4/h7-12,16-17H,5-6,13-15H2,1-4H3; Key:OIOQREYBGDAYGT-UHFFFAOYSA-N

Isotonitazene is a synthetic opioid analgesic drug from the nitazene class and structural homolog of etonitazene, which has been sold as a designer drug. It has only around half the potency of etonitazene in animal studies, but it is likely even less potent in humans as was seen with etonitazene (1000 times as potent as morphine in animal models yet only 60 times as potent in humans). Isotonitazene (obtained from an online vendor) was fully characterized in November 2019 in a paper where the authors performed a full analytical structure elucidation in addition to determination of the potency at the μ-opioid receptor using a biological functional assay in vitro. While isotonitazene was not compared directly to morphine in this assay, it was found to be around 2.5 times more potent than hydromorphone and slightly more potent than fentanyl.

== Side effects ==
Side effects of benzimidazole derived opioids are likely to be similar to those of fentanyl, which include itching, nausea and potentially serious respiratory depression, which can be life-threatening.

Isotonitazene has been detected in multiple fatalities in Europe since March 2019 and in the U.S. since August 2019, as reported by NPS Discovery, the Center for Forensic Science Research and Education, and NMS Labs.

== Legal status ==
The US Drug Enforcement Administration issued a notice of intent to publish a temporary order to schedule isotonitazene in Schedule I of the Controlled Substances Act, which came into effect on 20 August 2020.

== See also ==
- Clonitazene
- Etonitazene
- Etonitazepyne
- Etazen
- MCHB-1
- Metonitazene
- Protonitazene
- Secbutonitazene
