= Etonitazene =

Chemical compound

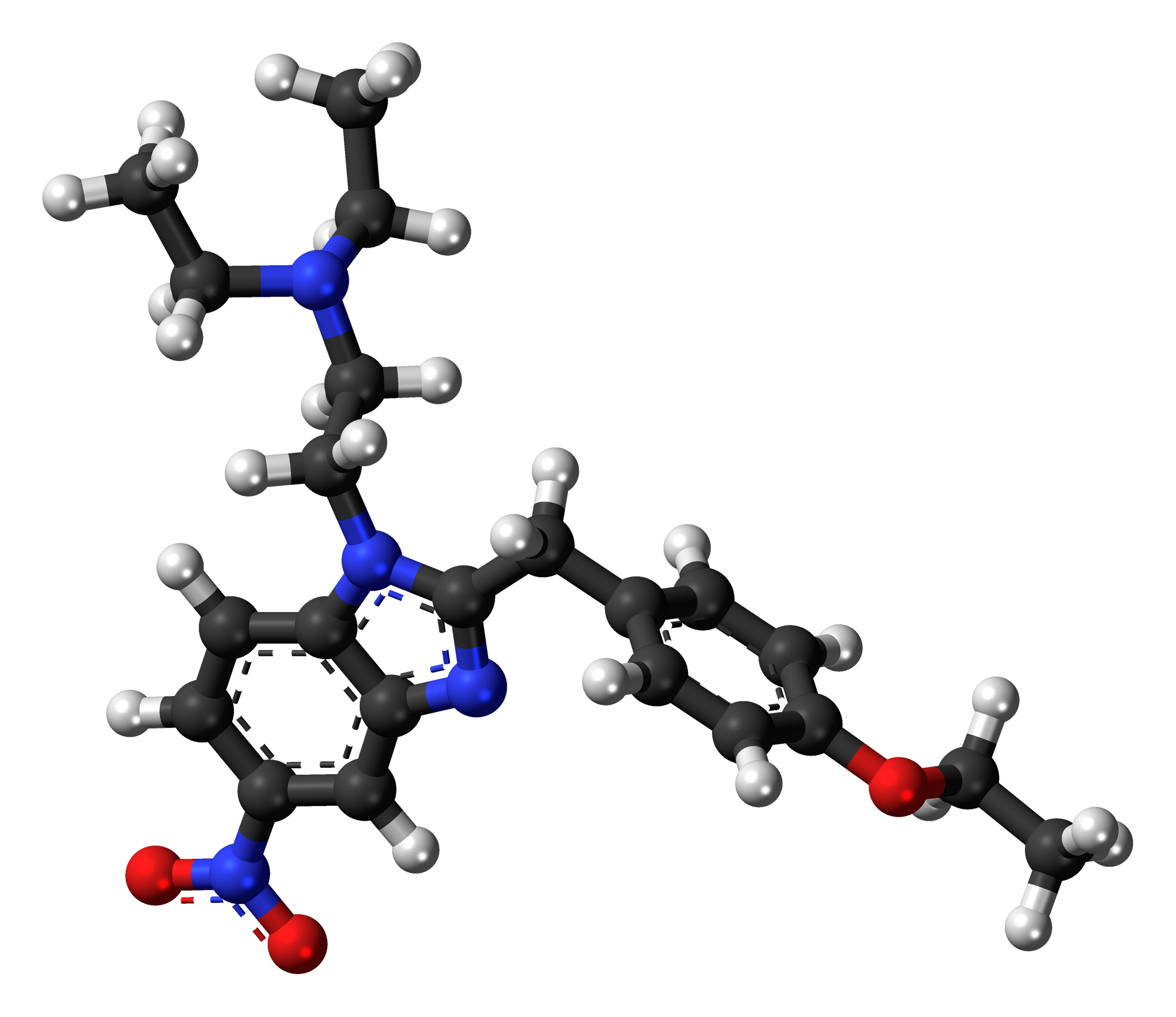

Clinical data
- ATC code: none

Legal status
- Legal status: BR: Class A1 (Narcotic drugs); CA: Schedule I; DE: Anlage I (Authorized scientific use only); UK: Class A; US: Schedule I

Identifiers
- IUPAC name: 2-(p-Ethoxybenzyl)-1-diethylaminoethyl-5-nitrobenzimidazole
- CAS Number: 911-65-9
- PubChem CID: 13493
- IUPHAR/BPS: 1624
- DrugBank: DB01462
- ChemSpider: 12908
- UNII: 9U3GT3353T
- KEGG: D12669
- ChEBI: CHEBI:234361
- ChEMBL: ChEMBL312040
- CompTox Dashboard (EPA): DTXSID6048919
- ECHA InfoCard: 100.011.827

Chemical and physical data
- Formula: C_{22}H_{28}N_{4}O_{3}
- Molar mass: 396.491 g·mol^{−1}
- 3D model (JSmol): Interactive image
- SMILES: CCOC1=CC=C(CC2=NC3=C(N2CCN(CC)CC)C=CC(N(=O)=O)=C3)C=C1
- InChI: InChI=1S/C22H28N4O3/c1-4-24(5-2)13-14-25-21-12-9-18(26(27)28)16-20(21)23-22(25)15-17-7-10-19(11-8-17)29-6-3/h7-12,16H,4-6,13-15H2,1-3H3; Key:PXDBZSCGSQSKST-UHFFFAOYSA-N

Etonitazene, also known as EA-4941 or CS-4640, is a benzimidazole opioid, first reported in 1957, that has been shown to have approximately 1,000 to 1,500 times the potency of morphine in animals.

Because it is characterized by a strong dependency potential and a tendency to produce profound respiratory depression, it is not used in humans. It is, however, useful in animal models for addiction studies, particularly those requiring the animals to drink or ingest the agent, because it is not as bitter as opiate salts like morphine sulfate.

== Legal Status ==
=== United Kingdom ===
Until 2024, Etonitazene is one of just two nitazenes that was banned in the UK since 1971, the other being clonitazene, as these were included in UN conventions.

Nitazenes were not seen in the UK drug market until they began to appear in heroin in the early 2020s. In 2024 Etonitazene was moved to Schedule 1 alongside 14 other nitazenes being added to the UK Misuse of Drugs Act.

United States

In the USA, Etonitazene is a Schedule I controlled substance.

== Analogs ==
A number of analogues are known, with the only other well-known compound to come out of the original 1950s research being clonitazene, which is much weaker than etonitazene (around 3x morphine). More recently since around late 2018 a number of designer analogues have started to appear on illicit markets around the world, with the most prominent compounds being metonitazene, isotonitazene and etazene, though others have continued to appear.

Of these analogues, only etonitazene and clonitazene are explicitly listed under UN conventions and so are controlled throughout the world. In the United States Etonitazene is a Schedule I narcotic controlled substance with a DEA ACSCN of 9624 and a 25 gram (7/8 oz) manufacturing quota as of 2022.

== Illicit production ==
Illicit production and sale of etonitazene has been limited. Identified on the Moscow illegal drug market in 1998, it was primarily smoked in laced cigarettes. In Ogden, Utah, a chemist at Morton Thiokol synthesized the compound for his own use. The drug was produced in Russia in 1996 and sold as 'Chinese Dwarf'. The drug resulted in an unconfirmed number of deaths due to its uncertain potency.

Etonitazene appears to have a steep dose-response curve, and unpredictable pharmacokinetics especially when injected, in a similar manner to some other potent opioids such as dextromoramide, which may cause etonitazene to be especially hazardous when compared to opioids of similar potency such as fentanyl.

== Synthesis ==
Etonitazene and related nitazene opioids were discovered in the late 1950s, by a team of Swiss researchers working at the pharmaceutical firm CIBA (now Novartis). One of the first compounds investigated by the Swiss team was 1-(β-diethylaminoethyl)-2-benzylbenzimidazole, which was found to possess 10% of the analgesic activity of morphine when tested in rodent bioassays.

This finding encouraged the group to begin a comprehensive systematic study of 2-benzylbenzimidazoles and to establish the structure-activity relationship of this new family of analgesics. Two general synthetic methods were developed for the preparation of these compounds.

The first method involved the condensation of o-phenylenediamine with para-ethoxy-phenylacetonitrile to form a 2-benzylbenzimidazole. The benzimidazole is then alkylated with the desired 1-chloro-2-dialkylaminoethane, forming the final product. This particular procedure was most useful for the preparation of benzimidazoles that lacked substituents on the benzene rings. A diagram of this method is displayed below.

The most versatile synthesis developed by the Swiss team first involved alkylation of 2,4-dinitrochlorobenzene with 1-amino-2-diethylaminoethane to form N-(β-diethylaminoethyl)-2,4-dinitroaniline (also known as N′-(2,4-dinitrophenyl)-N,N-diethyl-ethane-1,2-diamine). The 2-nitro substituent on the 2,4-dinitroaniline compound is then selectively reduced to the corresponding primary amine by utilizing ammonium sulfide as the reducing agent.

The ammonium sulfide can be formed in situ by the addition of concentrated aqueous ammonium hydroxide followed by saturation of the solution with hydrogen sulfide gas. The intermediate formed by the selective reduction of the 2-nitro substituent, 2-(β-diethylaminoethylamino)-5-nitroaniline, is then reacted with the hydrochloride salt of the imino ethyl ether of 4-ethoxyphenylacetonitrile (a.k.a. p-ethoxybenzyl cyanide).

The imino ether, 2-(4-ethoxyphenyl)-acetimidic acid ethyl ester hydrochloride, is prepared by dissolving the 4-substituted benzyl cyanide in a mixture of anhydrous ethanol and chloroform and then saturating this solution with dry hydrogen chloride gas. The reaction between the 2-(β-dialkylaminoalkylamine)-5-nitroaniline and the HCl salt of the imino ethyl ether results in the formation of etonitazene. This procedure is particularly useful in the preparation of the 4-, 5-, 6-, and 7-nitrobenzimidazoles.

Varying the choice of the substituted phenylacetic acid imino ether affords compounds with a diversity of substituents on the benzene ring at the 2- position. A diagram of this particular synthesis as it applies to the preparation of etonitazene is shown below.

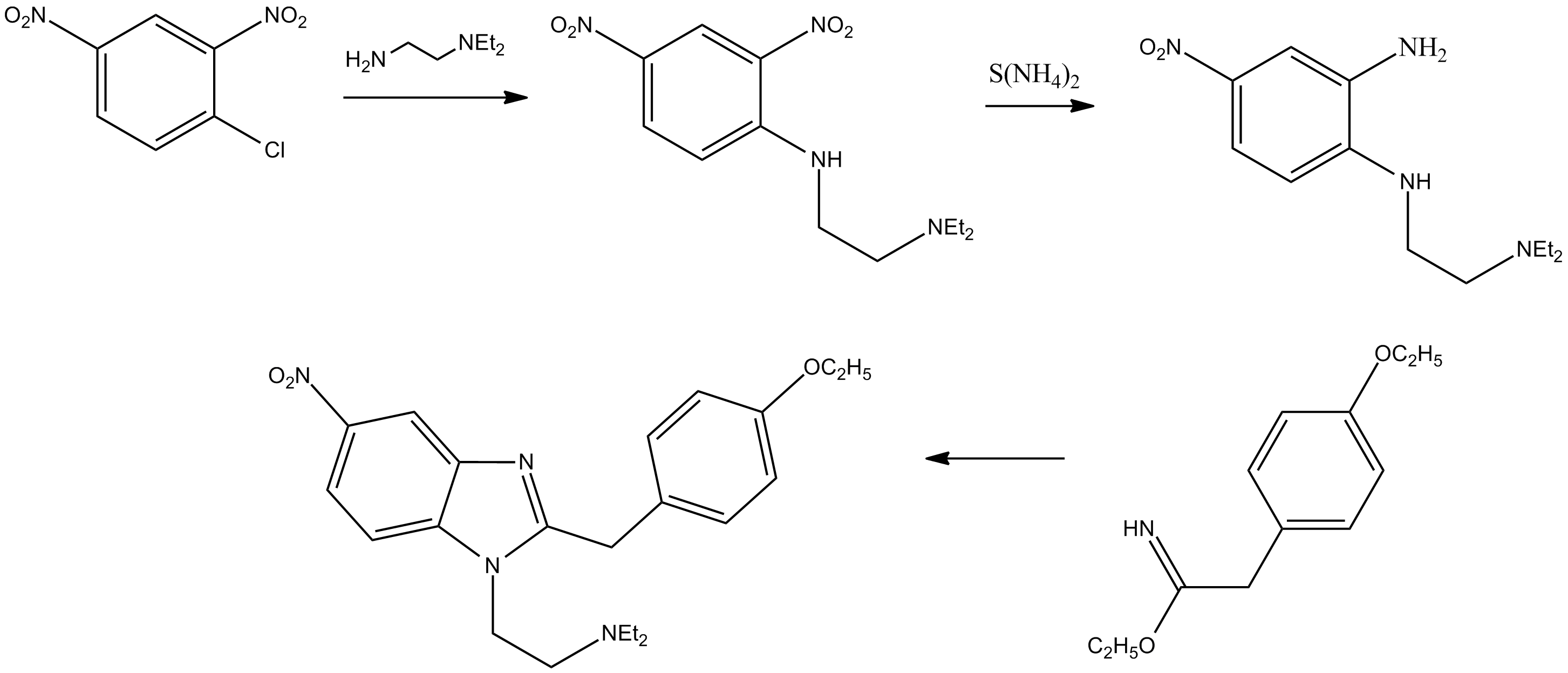

A particularly novel, high-yielding synthesis of etonitazene was developed by FI Carroll and MC Coleman in the mid-1970s The authors were tasked with the preparation of large quantities of etonitazene, but found the conventional synthesis to be inadequate. The problem with the conventional synthesis was the lability of the imino ether reactant, 2-(4-ethoxyphenyl)-acetimidic acid ethyl ester (prepared by reacting 4-ethoxyphenylacetonitrile with ethanolic HCl). The imino ether necessitated the use of anhydrous reaction conditions and was inconvenient to prepare in large quantities. This led the authors to experiment with the use of a coupling reagent, EEDQ (N-ethoxycarbonyl-2-ethoxy-1,2-dihydroquinoline), in order to promote the condensation of 2-(2-diethylaminoethylamino)-5-nitroaniline with 4-ethoxyphenylacetic acid. The authors discovered that when this condensation was performed in the presence of 2 or more molar equivalents of EEDQ (added portionwise in 3 steps) in THF at 50 °C for 192 hours (8 days), a near quantitative yield (100%) of etonitazene was obtained. In addition to the impressive improvement in yield over the conventional procedure, the work up procedure was greatly simplified since quinoline, carbon dioxide, and ethanol were the only by-products formed. A diagram of this procedure is shown below.

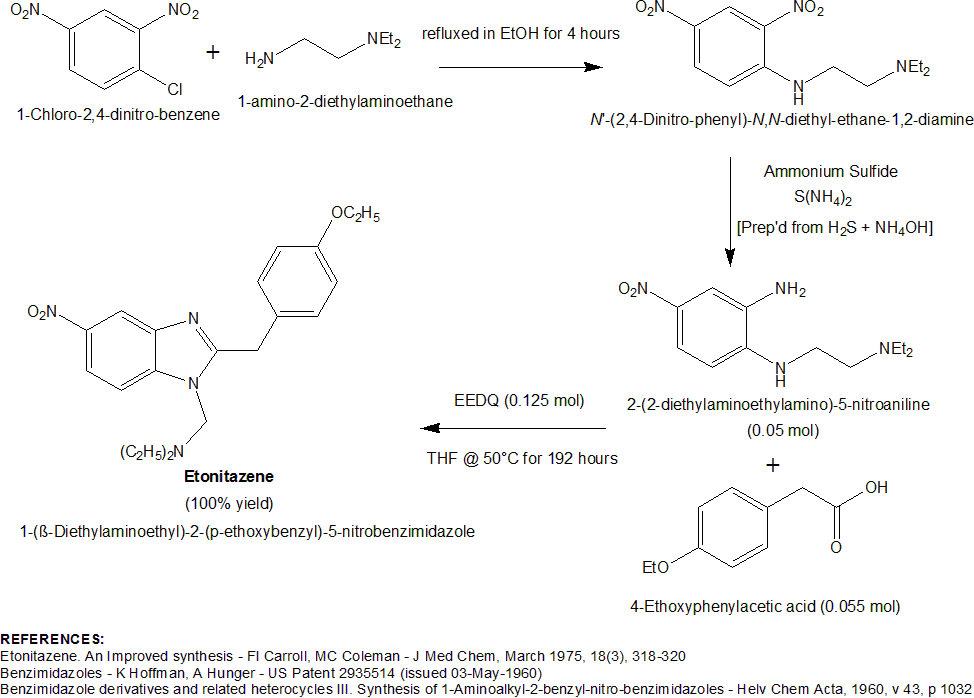

== See also ==
- Etazen (Etodesnitazene, a similar structure without the nitro group)
