= Metonitazene =

Chemical compound (analgesic drug)

Legal status
- Legal status: BR: Class F1 (Prohibited narcotics); DE: Anlage II (Authorized trade only, not prescriptible); UK: Class A; US: Schedule I; Illegal in Sweden

Identifiers
- IUPAC name: 2-[2-(4-Methoxybenzyl)-5-nitro-1H-benzimidazol-1-yl]-N,N-diethylethanamine
- CAS Number: 14680-51-4
- PubChem CID: 53316366
- ChemSpider: 81407756
- UNII: A7FF4K4CWB
- KEGG: C22727
- ChEBI: CHEBI:234362
- CompTox Dashboard (EPA): DTXSID901336445

Chemical and physical data
- Formula: C_{21}H_{26}N_{4}O_{3}
- Molar mass: 382.464 g·mol^{−1}
- 3D model (JSmol): Interactive image
- SMILES: CCN(CC)CCN1C2=C(C=C(C=C2)[N+](=O)[O-])N=C1CC3=CC=C(C=C3)OC
- InChI: InChI=1S/C21H26N4O3/c1-4-23(5-2)12-13-24-20-11-8-17(25(26)27)15-19(20)22-21(24)14-16-6-9-18(28-3)10-7-16/h6-11,15H,4-5,12-14H2,1-3H3; Key:HNGZTLMRQTVPBH-UHFFFAOYSA-N

Metonitazene is an analgesic compound related to etonitazene, which was first reported in 1957, and has been shown to have approximately 100 times the potency of morphine by central routes of administration, but if used orally it has been shown to have approximately 10 times the potency of morphine.

Its effects are similar to other opioids such as fentanyl and heroin, including analgesia, euphoria, and sleepiness. Adverse effects include vomiting, and respiratory depression that can potentially be fatal. Because of high dependency potential and dangerous adverse effects it has never been introduced into pharmacotherapy. It is instead commonly used in the illicit manufacture of counterfeit oxycodone opioid pills.

== Legal status ==
In the United States, metonitazene is a Schedule I controlled substance under the Controlled Substances Act.

Metonitazene is not controlled under the 1971 Convention on Psychotropic Substances; however, in many countries possession or intent to sell for human consumption might be prosecuted under several analog acts.

Metonitazene became a Class A drug in the UK on 20th March 2024.

== See also ==
- AH-7921
- Etonitazepyne
- Isotonitazene
- MT-45
- Piperidylthiambutene
- U-47700
