= Benzimidazole =

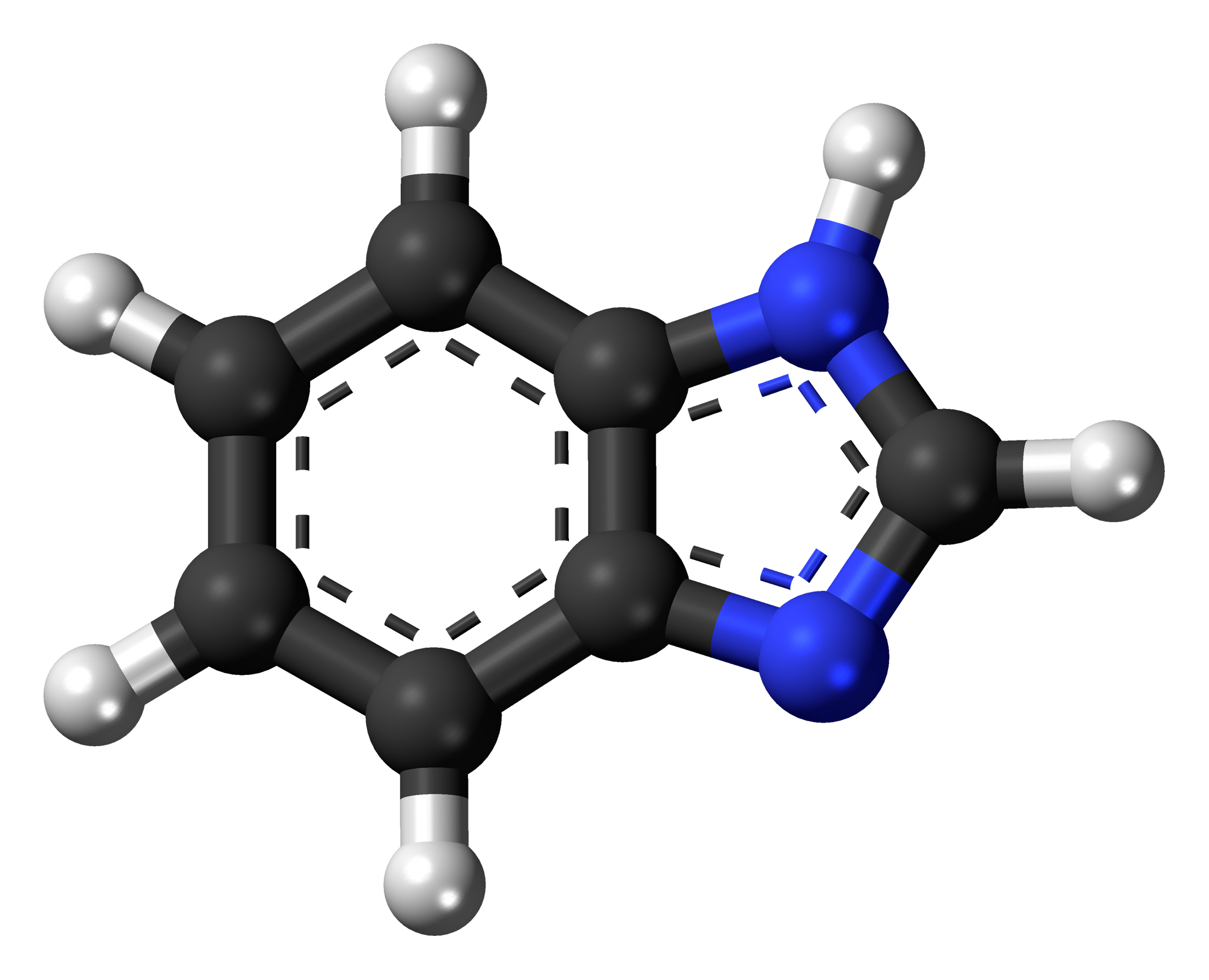

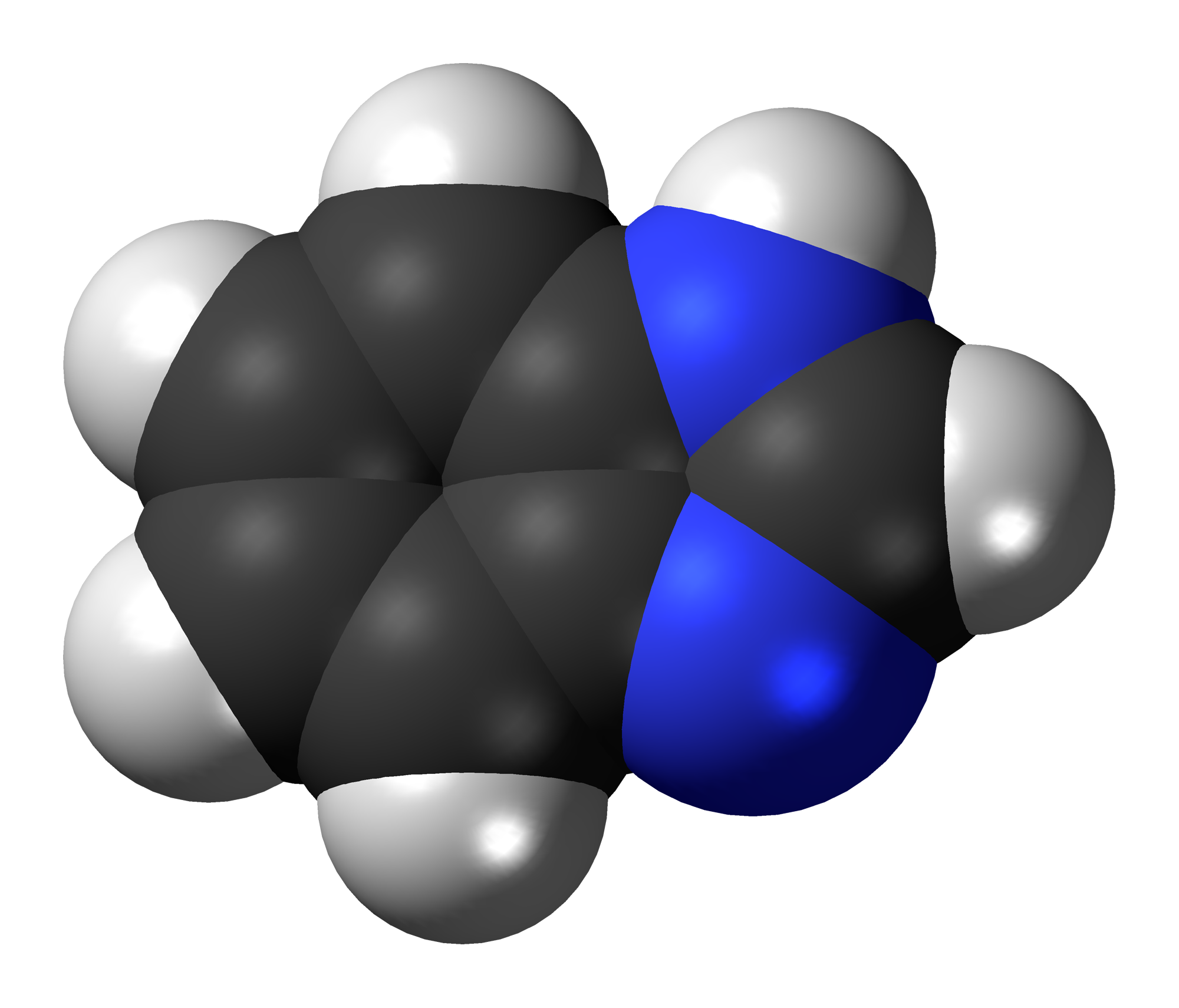

Names
- Preferred IUPAC name 1H-1,3-Benzimidazole
- Other names 1H-Benzo[d]imidazole

Identifiers
CAS Number	51-17-2
3D model (JSmol)	Interactive image
Beilstein Reference	109682
ChEBI	CHEBI:41275
ChEMBL	ChEMBL306226
ChemSpider	5593
DrugBank	DB02962
ECHA InfoCard	100.000.075
EC Number	200-081-4
Gmelin Reference	3106
KEGG	C02009
PubChem CID	5798
UNII	E24GX49LD8
CompTox Dashboard (EPA)	DTXSID8024573
- InChI: InChI=1S/C7H6N2/c1-2-4-7-6(3-1)8-5-9-7/h1-5H,(H,8,9) Key: HYZJCKYKOHLVJF-UHFFFAOYSA-N; InChI=1/C7H6N2/c1-2-4-7-6(3-1)8-5-9-7/h1-5H,(H,8,9) Key: HYZJCKYKOHLVJF-UHFFFAOYAX
- SMILES: c1ccc2c(c1)[nH]cn2

Properties
Chemical formula	C_{7}H_{6}N_{2}
Molar mass	118.139 g·mol^{−1}
Melting point	170 to 172 °C (338 to 342 °F; 443 to 445 K)
Acidity (pK_{a})	12.8 (for benzimidazole) and 5.6 (for the conjugate acid)

Hazards
- GHS labelling
Pictograms	(GHS07: Exclamation mark)
Signal word	Warning
Hazard statements	H302, H315, H319, H335
Precautionary statements	P261, P264, P270, P271, P280, P301+P312, P302+P352, P304+P340, P305+P351+P338, P312, P321, P330, P332+P313, P337+P313, P362, P403+P233, P405, P501
Safety data sheet (SDS)	External MSDS
- Except where otherwise noted, data are given for materials in their standard state (at 25 °C [77 °F], 100 kPa). verify (what is ?) Infobox references

Benzimidazole is a heterocyclic aromatic organic compound. This bicyclic compound may be viewed as fused rings of the aromatic compounds benzene and imidazole. It is a white solid that appears in form of tabular crystals.

== Preparation ==
Benzimidazole was discovered during research on vitamin B_{12}. The benzimidazole nucleus was found to be a stable platform on which drugs could be developed. Benzimidazole is produced by condensation of o-phenylenediamine with formic acid, or the equivalent trimethyl orthoformate:

C_{6}H_{4}(NH_{2})_{2} + HC(OCH_{3})_{3} → C_{6}H_{4}N(NH)CH + 3 CH_{3}OH

2-Substituted derivatives are obtained when the condensation is conducted with aldehydes in place of formic acid, followed by oxidation.

== Reactions ==
Benzimidazole is a base:

C_{6}H_{4}N(NH)CH + H^{+} → [C_{6}H_{4}(NH)_{2}CH]^{+}

It can also be deprotonated with stronger bases:

C_{6}H_{4}N(NH)CH + LiH → Li [C_{6}H_{4}N_{2}CH] + H_{2}

The imine can be alkylated and also serves as a ligand in coordination chemistry. The most prominent benzimidazole complex features N-ribosyl-dimethylbenzimidazole, as found in vitamin B_{12}.

N,N'-Dialkylbenzimidazolium salts are precursors to certain N-heterocyclic carbenes.

== Applications ==
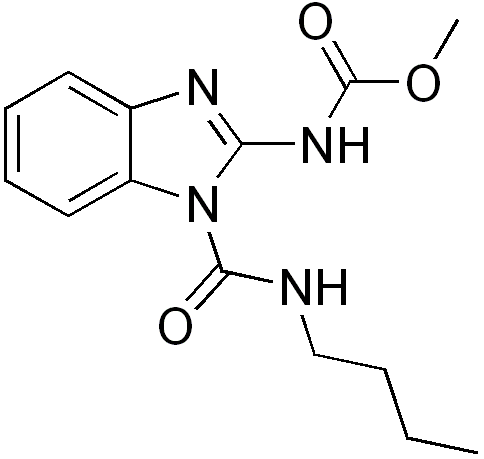
Benomyl is a fungicide with a benzimidazole core

Benzimidazole derivatives are among the most frequently used ring systems for small molecule drugs listed by the United States Food and Drug Administration. Many pharmaceutical agents belong to the benzimidazole class of compounds. For example:

- Angiotensin II receptor blockers such as azilsartan, candesartan, and telmisartan.
- Anthelmintic agents such as albendazole, ciclobendazole, fenbendazole, flubendazole, mebendazole, oxfendazole, oxibendazole, triclabendazole, and thiabendazole. These drugs work by binding tubulin, a vital part of the cytoskeleton and mitotic spindle. Benzimidazoles are selectively toxic towards parasitic nematodes, selectively binding and depolymerising their tubulins.
- Antihistamines such as astemizole, bilastine, clemizole, emedastine, mizolastine, and oxatomide.
- Benzimidazole fungicides such as benomyl, carbendazim, fuberidazole, and thiabendazole. These drugs selectively bind to and depolymerise fungal tubulin.
- Benzimidazole opioids such as bezitramide, brorphine, clonitazene, etodesnitazene, etonitazene, etonitazepipne, etonitazepyne, isotonitazene, metodesnitazene, and metonitazene.
- Proton-pump inhibitors such as dexlansoprazole, esomeprazole, ilaprazole, lansoprazole, omeprazole, pantoprazole, rabeprazole, and tenatoprazole.
- Typical antipsychotics such as benperidol, clopimozide, droperidol, neflumozide, and oxiperomide, and pimozide.
- Other notable pharmaceutical agents which contain a benzimidazole group include abemaciclib, bendamustine, dabigatran, daridorexant, and glasdegib.

In printed circuit board manufacturing, benzimidazole can be used as an organic solderability preservative.

Certain benzimidazoles are used as precursors to synthesize benzimidazoliums by reducing the carbon-nitrogen double bond. These have been shown to act as hydride donors.

Several dyes are derived from benzimidazoles.

Heterogeneous ferrocene-based electrocatalysts have been investigated for the electrochemical synthesis of benzimidazole derivatives.

== See also ==
- Benzimidazoline
- Polybenzimidazole, a high performance fiber
