= Benzimidazole opioids =

Class of synthetic opioids

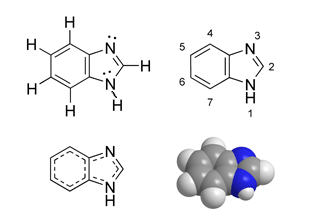
Benzimidazole core structure

Benzimidazole opioids are a class of synthetic opioids that contain a benzimidazole core structure. The pain-relieving properties of these substances were discovered in the mid-1950s by the Swiss company Ciba AG. The most important subgroup are the nitazene opioids, which since 2019 have become increasingly widespread as narcotics in North America and Europe, as well as West Africa. Some other benzimidazole-containing opioids are classified separately under the orphine subgroup. There is currently no medical usage due to the high potencies of certain analogs.

== History ==
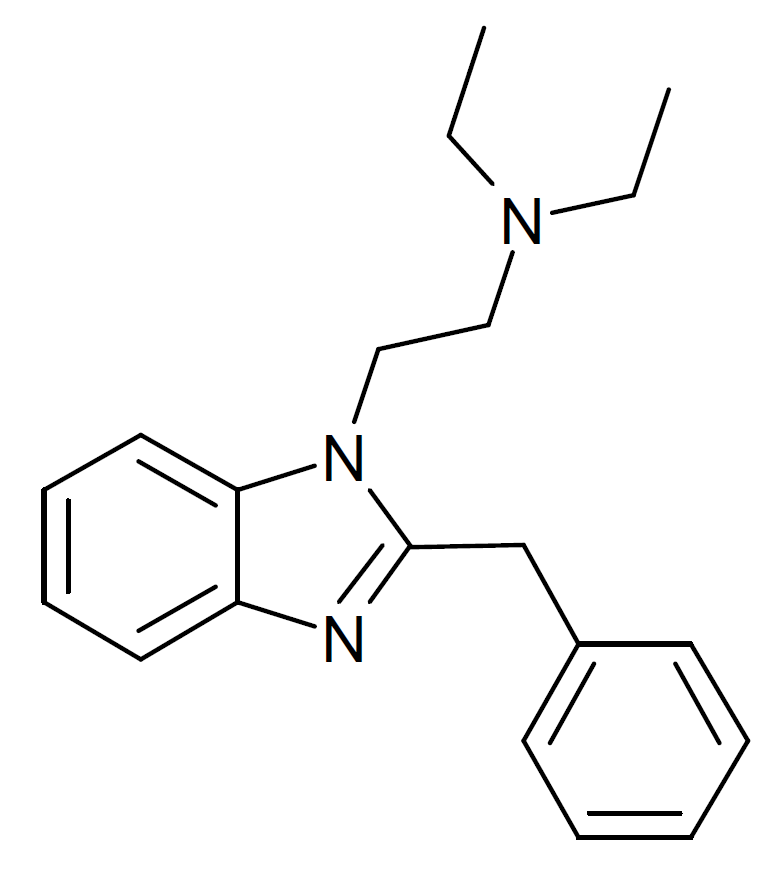
Desnitazene

In 1957, the pharmaceutical research department of Ciba AG published the discovery of the (low) analgesic effect of 1-(β-diethylaminoethyl)-2-benzylbenzimidazole (desnitazene). Shortly afterwards, the nitazenes were discovered in structure-activity relationship studies.

== Mechanism of action ==
Benzimidazole opioids are μ-opioid receptor agonists, similar to other synthetic opioids, and may exhibit significantly higher potencies than that of morphine. However, the potency of a given benzimidazole opioid can vary greatly depending on its structure: isotonitazene is estimated to be hundreds of times more potent than fentanyl while butonitazene is estimated to be less potent than morphine. Furthermore, some benzimidazole opioids have also been developed to target other pathways, such as the inhibition of nitric oxide synthase.

== See also ==
- 25-NB
- Arylcyclohexylamine
- Kush (drug)
- List of aminorex analogues
- List of benzodiazepines
- List of fentanyl analogues
- List of orphine opioids
- List of phenyltropanes
- Utopioid
