= MGM-16 =

Chemical compound

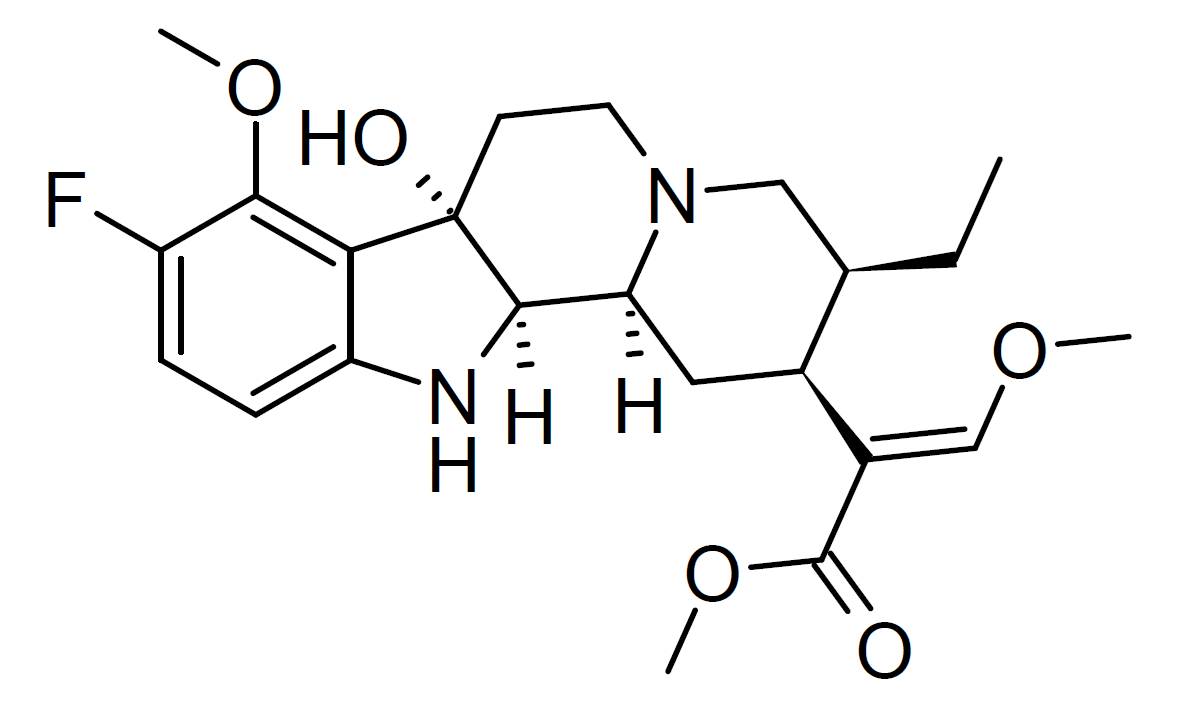

Clinical data
- Drug class: Opioid
- ATC code: None

Legal status
- Legal status: US: Schedule I

Identifiers
- IUPAC name: methyl (E)-2-[(2S,3S,7aS,12aR,12bS)-3-ethyl-9-fluoro-7a-hydroxy-8-methoxy-2,3,4,6,7,12,12a,12b-octahydro-1H-indolo[2,3-a]quinolizin-2-yl]-3-methoxyprop-2-enoate
- CAS Number: 1158901-40-6
- PubChem CID: 168277847
- ChEMBL: ChEMBL5178271

Chemical and physical data
- Formula: C_{23}H_{31}FN_{2}O_{5}
- Molar mass: 434.508 g·mol^{−1}
- 3D model (JSmol): Interactive image
- SMILES: CC[C@@H]1CN2CC[C@]3([C@@H]([C@@H]2C[C@@H]1/C(=C\OC)/C(=O)OC)NC4=C3C(=C(C=C4)F)OC)O
- InChI: InChI=1S/C23H31FN2O5/c1-5-13-11-26-9-8-23(28)19-17(7-6-16(24)20(19)30-3)25-21(23)18(26)10-14(13)15(12-29-2)22(27)31-4/h6-7,12-14,18,21,25,28H,5,8-11H2,1-4H3/b15-12+/t13-,14+,18+,21-,23+/m1/s1; Key:DKMVCOVCNPWGTO-CMWCKQEVSA-N

MGM-16 is an opioid drug which is a synthetic derivative of mitragynine, a natural product derived from the Southeast Asian tree kratom. It is the 9-fluoro derivative of another semi-synthetic mitragynine derivative MGM-15, and is a comparatively potent opioid analgesic with approximately 240 times the potency of morphine. While several semi-synthetic derivatives of mitragynine such as 7-hydroxymitragynine and MGM-15 were widely sold in the United States as unscheduled designer drug alternatives to illicit opioids from around 2023–2026, it is unclear whether MGM-16 has appeared on the market to any significant extent. Nevertheless, on 2 July 2026, the DEA published a notice of intent to schedule three 7-hydroxymitragynine-related substances (mitragynine pseudoindoxyl, MGM-15, and MGM-16) under Schedule I of the Controlled Substances Act. As of August 5th, 2026 MGM-16 has been placed in Schedule I through an emergency temporary scheduling order, making unauthorized possession, manufacture, and distribution illegal under federal law.

== See also ==
- 7-Acetoxymitragynine
