= C23H30N2O4 =

The molecular formula C_{23}H_{30}N_{2}O_{4} (molar mass : 398.49 g/mol) may refer to:

- Conopharyngine
- Desacetoxyvindoline
- Mitragynine, an indole alkaloid
- Pholcodine
- Speciociliatine
