= KNT-127 =

Opioid

Names
- IUPAC name (1R,14S,15R)-25-Methyl-4,25-diazahexacyclo[13.7.3.0^{1,14}.0^{3,12}.0^{5,10}.0^{17,22}]pentacosa-3,5,7,9,11,17(22),18,20-octaene-14,20-diol

Identifiers
CAS Number	1256921-89-7
3D model (JSmol)	Interactive image
ChEMBL	ChEMBL1270282
ChemSpider	26362663
PubChem CID	52942137
- InChI: InChI=1S/C24H24N2O2/c1-26-9-8-23-14-21-17(10-16-4-2-3-5-20(16)25-21)13-24(23,28)22(26)11-15-6-7-18(27)12-19(15)23/h2-7,10,12,22,27-28H,8-9,11,13-14H2,1H3/t22-,23-,24-/m1/s1 Key: NFXFNBIPWUYEIM-WXFUMESZSA-N
- SMILES: CN1CC[C@]23CC4=NC5=CC=CC=C5C=C4C[C@]2([C@H]1CC6=C3C=C(C=C6)O)O

Properties
Chemical formula	C_{24}H_{24}N_{2}O_{2}
Molar mass	372.468 g·mol^{−1}
- Except where otherwise noted, data are given for materials in their standard state (at 25 °C [77 °F], 100 kPa). Infobox references

KNT-127 is an opioid drug selective for the delta opioid receptors. It might be used as an analgesic and anxiolytic.

== Potential uses ==
KNT-127 can be used as an analgesic. In mice, it was able to reverse inflammatory hyperalgesia.

Multiple tests have shown KNT-127 to be able to reduce anxiety, in a similar way to muscimol, a GABA_{A} agonist.

== Tolerance ==
Chronic administration of KNT-127 created cross-tolerance to the analgesic effects of SNC-80, another opioid.
