= C24H28N2O3 =

The molecular formula C_{24}H_{28}N_{2}O_{3} (molar mass: 392.49 g/mol, exact mass: 392.2100 u) may refer to:

- ADL-5747
- ADL-5859
- Indacaterol
- Ivacaftor
- Naftopidil
