= AZD-7268 =

Abandoned antidepressant drug

Clinical data
- Other names: AZD7268; AZ12488024; AZ-12488024
- Routes of administration: Oral
- Drug class: δ-Opioid receptor agonist

Identifiers
- IUPAC name: N-(2-hydroxyethyl)-N-methyl-4-[quinolin-8-yl-[1-(1,3-thiazol-4-ylmethyl)piperidin-4-ylidene]methyl]benzamide
- CAS Number: 1018988-00-5
- PubChem CID: 24772484
- IUPHAR/BPS: 7824
- ChemSpider: 28490710
- UNII: 958Y70F3HQ
- ChEMBL: ChEMBL1946618
- ECHA InfoCard: 100.205.777

Chemical and physical data
- Formula: C_{29}H_{30}N_{4}O_{2}S
- Molar mass: 498.65 g·mol^{−1}
- 3D model (JSmol): Interactive image
- SMILES: CN(CCO)C(=O)C1=CC=C(C=C1)C(=C2CCN(CC2)CC3=CSC=N3)C4=CC=CC5=C4N=CC=C5
- InChI: InChI=1S/C29H30N4O2S/c1-32(16-17-34)29(35)24-9-7-21(8-10-24)27(26-6-2-4-23-5-3-13-30-28(23)26)22-11-14-33(15-12-22)18-25-19-36-20-31-25/h2-10,13,19-20,34H,11-12,14-18H2,1H3; Key:ZJKUETLEJYCOBO-UHFFFAOYSA-N

AZD-7268 is a δ-opioid receptor agonist which was under development for the treatment of major depressive disorder but was never marketed. It is taken by mouth.

The affinity (K_{i}) of AZD-7268 for the δ-opioid receptor was reported to be 2.7 nM and its selectivity for this receptor over the μ-opioid receptor was reported to be 2,000-fold. No animal studies of AZD-7268 appear to have been published. In addition to putative antidepressant effects, AZD-7268 might have anxiolytic effects. Structurally, AZD-7268 was derived from SNC-80.

Dose-limiting side effects of AZD-7268 in clinical trials included syncope (fainting), hypotension (low blood pressure), and dizziness.

AZD-7268 was first described by 2007. Its development was discontinued in 2010. It reached phase 2 clinical trials prior to the discontinuation of its development. No reason was given for the discontinuation of its development. However, the drug was found to be ineffective for major depressive disorder in a phase 2 clinical trial of 231 participants comparing it with placebo and escitalopram. The drug was under development by AstraZeneca.

== See also ==
- AZD-2327
