= AZD-2327 =

Abandoned antidepressant drug

Clinical data
- Other names: AZD 2327; AZD2327
- Routes of administration: Oral
- Drug class: δ-Opioid receptor agonist

Identifiers
- IUPAC name: 4-[(R)-(3-aminophenyl)-[4-[(4-fluorophenyl)methyl]piperazin-1-yl]methyl]-N,N-diethylbenzamide
- CAS Number: 875647-81-7 1197281-62-1 (hemifumarate)
- PubChem CID: 11525765
- ChemSpider: 9700551
- UNII: 3Q7J827527
- ECHA InfoCard: 100.170.827

Chemical and physical data
- Formula: C_{29}H_{35}FN_{4}O
- Molar mass: 474.624 g·mol^{−1}
- 3D model (JSmol): Interactive image
- SMILES: CCN(CC)C(=O)C1=CC=C(C=C1)[C@H](C2=CC(=CC=C2)N)N3CCN(CC3)CC4=CC=C(C=C4)F
- InChI: InChI=1S/C29H35FN4O/c1-3-33(4-2)29(35)24-12-10-23(11-13-24)28(25-6-5-7-27(31)20-25)34-18-16-32(17-19-34)21-22-8-14-26(30)15-9-22/h5-15,20,28H,3-4,16-19,21,31H2,1-2H3/t28-/m1/s1; Key:XGFLMBBZEPJGHY-MUUNZHRXSA-N

AZD-2327 is a δ-opioid receptor agonist which was under development for the treatment of depressive disorders and anxiety disorders but was never marketed. It is taken by mouth.

== Pharmacology ==
The drug showed antidepressant-like and anxiolytic-like effects as well as locomotor-stimulating effects in animal models. It had reduced induction of seizures and locomotor hyperactivity compared to other δ-opioid receptor agonists. The doses required for stimulant-like activity were 3- to 10-fold greater than the doses that produced antidepressant- and anxiolytic-like effects. The drug appears to have a very low misuse potential based on animal studies. In addition to its δ-opioid receptor agonist activity, AZD-2327 has been reported to act as a cytochrome P450 CYP3A4 inhibitor.

It has been found to inhibit the release of norepinephrine caused by anxiety and was able to do so as much as the benzodiazepine diazepam. However, AZD-2327 could be advantageous to benzodiazepines because these drugs often cause rapid tolerance and dependence. In contrast to benzodiazepines, AZD-2327 may have less or no potential for tolerance in terms of its anxiolytic-like effects.

== History ==
AZD-2327 was first described by 2004 and was first described in the scientific literature in 2009. The development of AZD-2327 was discontinued in 2010. It reached phase 2 clinical trials for both depressive disorders and anxiety disorders prior to its discontinuation. No reason was given for the discontinuation of its development. However, the drug was found to be ineffective for major depressive disorder in a phase 2 clinical trial. AZD-2327 was developed by AstraZeneca.

== See also ==
- AZD-7268
- BW373U86
- DPI-287
- DPI-3290
