= DAMGO =

Synthetic opioid peptide

Names
- IUPAC name (2S)-2-[[2-[[(2R)-2-[[(2S)-2-Amino-3-(4-hydroxyphenyl)propanoyl]amino]propanoyl]amino]acetyl]-methylamino]-N-(2-hydroxyethyl)-3-phenylpropanamide
- Other names Ala^{2}-MePhe^{4}-Glyol^{5}-Enkephalin, DAGO, DAMGE

Identifiers
CAS Number	78123-71-4
3D model (JSmol)	Interactive image
ChEMBL	ChEMBL38874
ChemSpider	4575423
IUPHAR/BPS	1647
PubChem CID	5462471
UNII	2YM5VT3MNR
CompTox Dashboard (EPA)	DTXSID30228775
- InChI: InChI=1S/C26H35N5O6/c1-17(30-25(36)21(27)14-19-8-10-20(33)11-9-19)24(35)29-16-23(34)31(2)22(26(37)28-12-13-32)15-18-6-4-3-5-7-18/h3-11,17,21-22,32-33H,12-16,27H2,1-2H3,(H,28,37)(H,29,35)(H,30,36)/t17-,21+,22+/m1/s1 Key: HPZJMUBDEAMBFI-WTNAPCKOSA-N; InChI=1/C26H35N5O6/c1-17(30-25(36)21(27)14-19-8-10-20(33)11-9-19)24(35)29-16-23(34)31(2)22(26(37)28-12-13-32)15-18-6-4-3-5-7-18/h3-11,17,21-22,32-33H,12-16,27H2,1-2H3,(H,28,37)(H,29,35)(H,30,36)/t17-,21+,22+/m1/s1 Key: HPZJMUBDEAMBFI-WTNAPCKOBV
- SMILES: C[C@@H](NC([C@@H](N)CC1=CC=C(O)C=C1)=O)C(NCC(N([C@H](C(NCCO)=O)CC2=CC=CC=C2)C)=O)=O

Properties
Chemical formula	C_{26}H_{35}N_{5}O_{6}
Molar mass	513.595 g·mol^{−1}
- Except where otherwise noted, data are given for materials in their standard state (at 25 °C [77 °F], 100 kPa). verify (what is ?) Infobox references

DAMGO ([D-Ala^{2}, N-MePhe^{4}, Gly-ol]-enkephalin) is a synthetic opioid peptide with high μ-opioid receptor specificity. It was synthesized as a biologically stable analog of δ-opioid receptor-preferring endogenous opioids, leu- and met-enkephalin. Structures of DAMGO bound to the μ opioid receptor reveal a very similar binding pose to morphinans.

Its structure is H-Tyr-D-Ala-Gly-N-MePhe-Gly-ol.

DAMGO has been used in experimental settings for the possibility of alleviating or reducing opiate tolerance for patients under the treatment of an opioid. Such treatment on rats, adding DAMGO to morphine administration, showed that after seven days morphine had as much of an effect at the same dosage as the first day when administered together with DAMGO to the rats, whereas a separate control group of rats that were administered the same dosage of morphine over the course of the same week, but without DAMGO, displayed an increased tolerance and lessened analgesic efficacy toward the end of that week.

== See also ==
- DADLE
- DALDA
- DPDPE
- KGOP01
- Morphiceptin
