= C23H28N2O =

The molecular formula C_{23}H_{28}N_{2}O (molar mass: 348.48 g/mol) may refer to:

- ARM390
- CUMYL-PICA (SGT-56)
- Cyclopropylfentanyl
- Iferanserin (VEN-309)
- NMP-7
