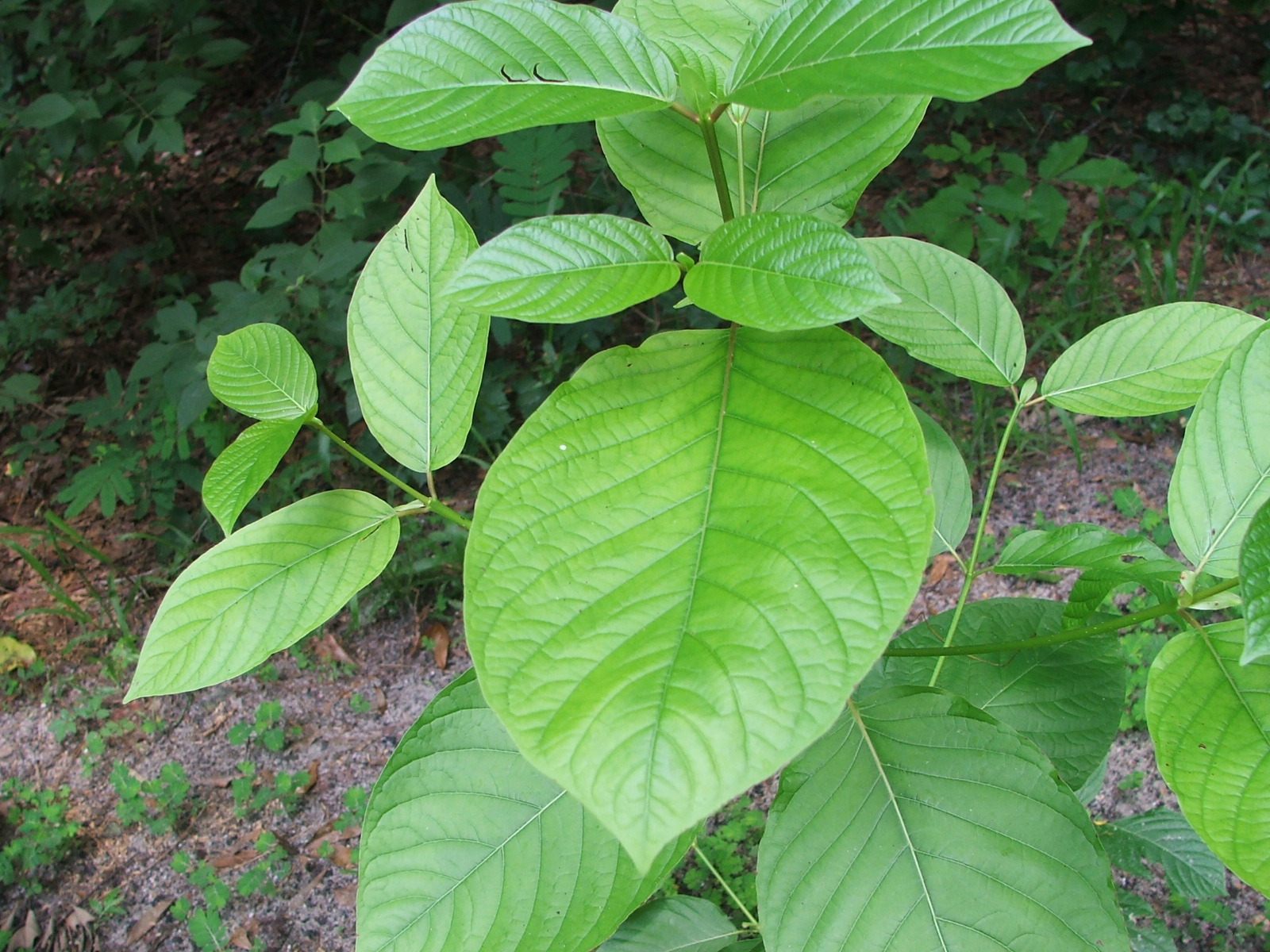

Conservation status
- Least Concern (IUCN 3.1)

Scientific classification
- Kingdom: Plantae
- Clade: Tracheophytes
- Clade: Angiosperms
- Clade: Eudicots
- Clade: Asterids
- Order: Gentianales
- Family: Rubiaceae
- Genus: Mitragyna
- Species: M. speciosa

Binomial name
- Mitragyna speciosa (Korth.) Havil.

Synonyms
- Nauclea korthalsii Steud. nom. inval.; Nauclea luzoniensis Blanco; Nauclea speciosa (Korth.) Miq.; Stephegyne speciosa Korth.

= Mitragyna speciosa =

Species of plant

Mitragyna speciosa is a tropical evergreen tree of the Rubiaceae family native to Southeast Asia. It is indigenous to Cambodia, Thailand, Indonesia, Malaysia, Myanmar, and Papua New Guinea, where its dark green, glossy leaves, known as kratom, have been used in herbal medicine since at least the 19th century. They have also historically been consumed via chewing, smoking, and as a tea. Kratom contains multiple alkaloids (primarily, mitragynine and to a lesser extent, 7-hydroxymitragynine) that bind to opioid receptors, mostly as a partial agonist of the μ-opioid receptor. Kratom can also be subjectively stimulating to some, though this is likely not achieved through typical stimulant mechanisms (such as reuptake inhibition or release of monoamines), nor is this a universal effect.

The efficacy and safety of kratom consumption are unclear. In 2019, the United States Food and Drug Administration (FDA) stated that there is no evidence that kratom is safe or effective as a medication for treating any condition. Kratom has been used for managing chronic pain, for treating opioid withdrawal symptoms, or for recreational purposes. It is under preliminary research for possible antipsychotic and antidepressant properties. Kratom use has not been shown to positively affect mental health.

Anecdotal reports describe increased alertness, physical energy, talkativeness, sociability, sedation, changes in mood, and pain relief following kratom use at various doses. Common side effects include appetite loss, erectile dysfunction, nausea and constipation. More severe side-effects may include respiratory depression (decreased breathing), seizure, psychosis, elevated heart rate and blood pressure, trouble sleeping, and liver injury. Addiction is a possible risk with regular use: when use is stopped, withdrawal symptoms may occur. Serious toxicity is relatively rare and generally appears at high doses or when kratom is used with other substances. A small number of deaths have been connected to the use of kratom, most commonly when mixed with other substances.

As of 2018, kratom is a controlled substance in 16 countries. Some countries, like Indonesia and Thailand, have recently moved toward regulated legal production for medical use. There is growing international concern about a possible threat to public health from kratom use. In some jurisdictions its sale and importation have been restricted, and several public health authorities have raised alerts.

== Description ==
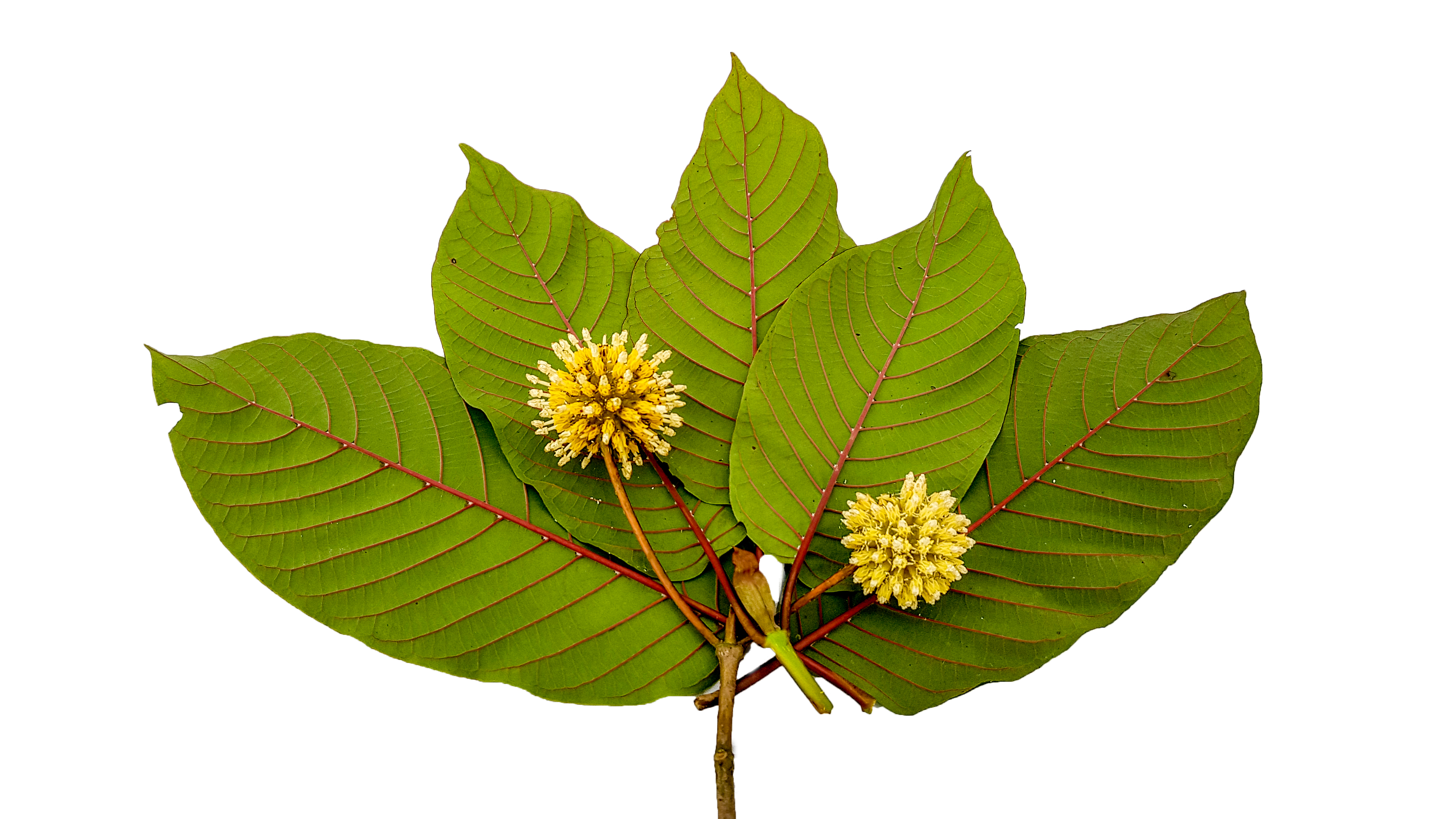
Kratom flowers and foliage

Mitragyna speciosa is an evergreen tree in the genus Mitragyna that can grow to a height of 25 m (82 ft). Its trunk may grow to a 0.9 m (3 ft) diameter. The trunk is generally straight, and the outer bark is smooth and grey. The leaves, ovate-acuminate in shape and opposite in growth pattern, are dark green, glossy on their upper surfaces, and can grow to over 14–20 cm (5.5–7.9 in) long and 7–12 cm (2.8–4.7 in) wide. They have 12 to 17 pairs of veins. The spherical inflorescences, which are deep yellow, grow in clusters of three at the ends of the branches. The calyx-tube is 2 mm (0.08 in) long and has five lobes; the corolla-tube is 2.5–3 millimetres (0.098–0.12 in) long.

Mitragyna speciosa is indigenous to Thailand, Indonesia, Malaysia, Myanmar, and Papua New Guinea. It was first formally described by the Dutch colonial botanist Pieter Korthals in 1839, who named it Stephegyne speciosa; it was renamed and reclassified several times before George Darby Haviland provided the final name and classification in 1859.

== Uses of the leaves ==
Kratom
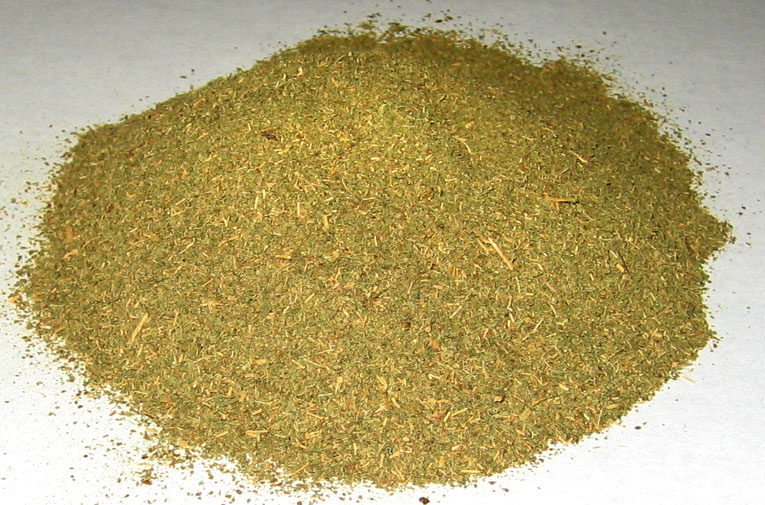
- Powder produced from unspecified tissues of the plant
- Part(s) of plant: Leaves
- Geographic origin: Southeast Asia
- Active ingredients: Mitragynine; 7-hydroxymitragynine; Other alkaloids; Raubasine; and more than 40 other compounds
- Main producers: Indonesia; Thailand
- Main consumers: Worldwide (No. 1: Thailand)
- Legal status: AU: S9 - Prohibited substance; BR: Class E (Controlled plants); CA: Unscheduled (Not authorized for sale or use), legal for religious use, such as incense; US: Unscheduled (Drug of concern), subject to import bans; UN: Unscheduled; Illegal in Malaysia, Myanmar, Indonesia

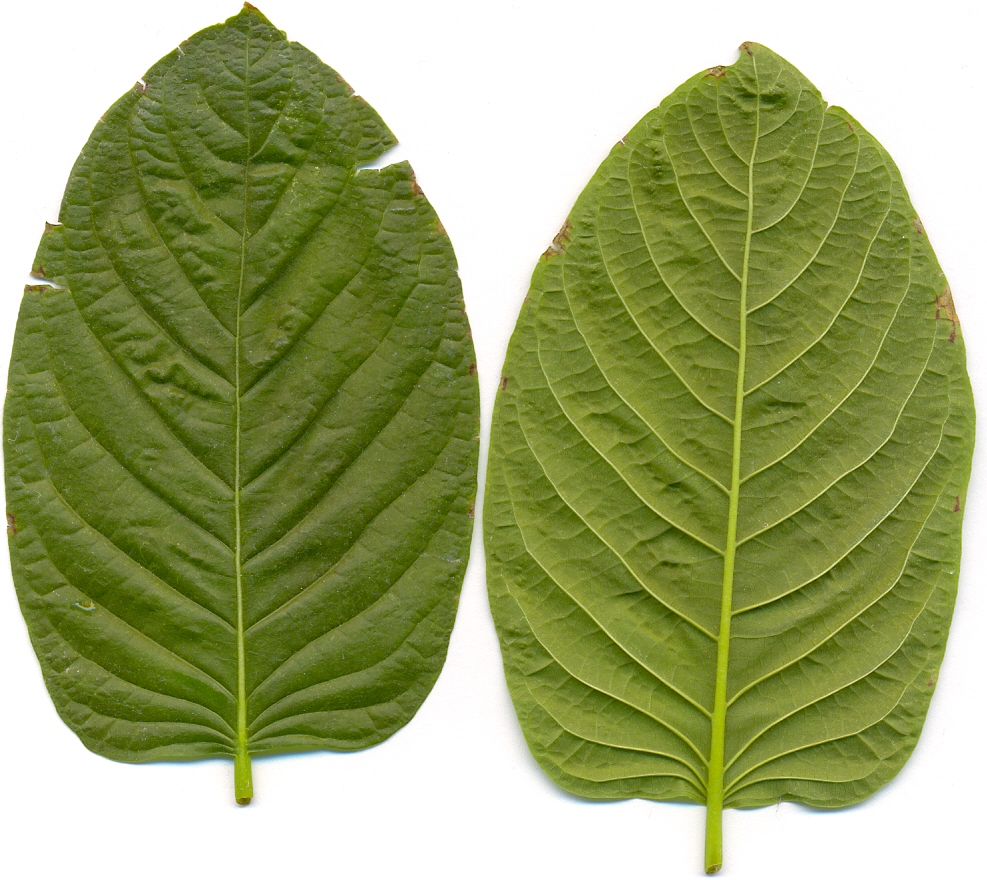
Kratom leaves

Kratom has been studied in vitro and in animals, but no clinical trials have been conducted in the United States. The U.S. Drug Enforcement Administration (DEA) stated in 2013 that there is no legitimate medical use for kratom, and in 2019, the U.S. Food and Drug Administration (FDA) said that there is no evidence that kratom is safe or effective for treating any condition, and that there are no approved clinical uses for kratom.

Kratom is commonly ingested by chewing, as a tea, powdered in capsules or pills, or extracted for use in liquids. Kratom is rarely smoked. Different varieties of kratom contain different relative proportions of alkaloids such as mitragynine.

=== Traditional use ===
In cultures where the plant grows, kratom has been used in traditional medicine. The leaves are chewed to relieve musculoskeletal pain and increase energy, appetite, and sexual desire in ways similar to khat and coca. The leaves, or extracts from them, are used to heal wounds and as a local anesthetic. Extracts and leaves have been used to treat coughs, diarrhea, and intestinal infections. They are also used as intestinal deworming agents in Thailand.

Kratom is often used by workers in laborious or monotonous occupations to stave off exhaustion and as a mood-enhancer and painkiller. In Thailand, kratom was "used as a snack to receive guests and was part of the ritual worship of ancestors and gods". The herb is bitter and is generally combined with a sweetener.

=== Opioid withdrawal ===
Because the withdrawal effects of kratom are often reported to be less severe than those associated with traditional opioids, some people use kratom in the attempt to manage opioid use disorder. As of 2018, there have been no formal trials to study the efficacy or safety of kratom to treat opioid addiction. Stanciu et al. conducted a review of all literature and found insufficient evidence for any conclusions concerning whether kratom is harmful or whether it can serve as harm reduction for those with opioid addiction. While some literature reviews claim that kratom has less potential for dependence or overdose than traditional opioids, other reviews note that kratom withdrawal itself can still be quite severe.

Data on how widely it is used worldwide are lacking, as it is not detected by typical drug screening tests. Rates of kratom use appear to be increasing among those who have been self-managing chronic pain with opioids purchased without a prescription and are cycling (but not quitting) their opioid use.

In 1836, kratom was reported to have been used as an opium substitute in Malaysia. Kratom was also used as an opium substitute in Thailand in the 19th century.

=== Recreational use ===
At low doses, kratom produces euphoric effects comparable to those of coca. At higher doses, kratom produces opioid-like effects. The onset of effects typically begins within five to ten minutes and lasts for two to five hours. Some anecdotal reports describe increased work capacity, alertness, talkativeness, sociability, increased sexual desire, positive mood, and euphoria following the consumption of kratom.

According to the U.S. DEA and a 2020 survey, kratom is used to alleviate pain, anxiety, depression, or opioid withdrawal.

In Thailand, a 2007 survey found that the lifetime, past year, and past 30 days kratom consumption rates were 2.32%, 0.81% and 0.57%, respectively, among respondents aged 12–65 years, and that kratom was the most widely used recreational drug in Thailand.

Kratom may be mixed with other psychoactive drugs, such as caffeine and codeine. Starting in the 2010s, a tea-based cocktail known as "4×100" became popular among some young people across Southeast Asia and especially in Thailand. It is a mix of kratom leaves, cough syrup, Coca-Cola, and ice. Around 2011, people who consumed the cocktail were often viewed more negatively than users of traditional kratom, but not as negatively as users of heroin. As of 2012, use of the cocktail was a severe problem among youth in three provinces along the border of Malaysia and southern Thailand.

In the U.S., as of 2015, kratom was available in outlets such as head shops and over the Internet; the prevalence of its U.S. use was unknown at the time. In the United States, kratom use increased rapidly between 2011 and 2017. By 2020, it was estimated that 15 million people worldwide use kratom.

== Adverse effects ==
Mitragyna speciosa may cause many adverse effects, and in November 2017 the FDA issued a public health advisory for the drug. The side effects of kratom appear to be dose-dependent and are more common with doses that exceed 8 g. While the incidence of adverse effects in people who use kratom is unknown, a 2019 review of 935 kratom exposures reported to U.S. poison control centers over a seven-year period listed the following signs and symptoms: agitation (18.6%), tachycardia (16.9%), drowsiness (13.6%), vomiting (11.2%), confusion (8.1%), seizures (6.1%), withdrawal symptoms (6.1%), hallucinations (4.8%), respiratory depression (2.8%), coma (2.3%), and cardiac or respiratory arrest (0.6%). The study also reported two deaths and four cases of neonatal abstinence syndrome. A different 2019 review listed as common side effects: decreased appetite, weight loss, erectile dysfunction, insomnia, sweating, hyperpigmentation, hair loss, tremor, and constipation.

Kratom products in the U.S. are commonly used in doses of 2–6 g of dried leaf, and doses exceeding 8 g are relatively uncommon. Given that kratom products may vary greatly in potency, there is no standard dosing system. At relatively low doses (1–5 g of raw leaves), at which there are mostly stimulant effects, side effects include contracted pupils and blushing; adverse effects related to stimulation include anxiety and agitation, and opioid-related effects such as itching, nausea, loss of appetite, and increased urination begin to appear. At moderate to high doses (5–15 g of raw leaves), at which opioid effects generally appear, additional adverse effects include tachycardia (an increased stimulant effect) as well as the opioid side effects of constipation, dizziness, hypotension, dry mouth, and sweating.

Long-term use of high doses of kratom may lead to development of tolerance, dependence, and withdrawal symptoms, including loss of appetite, weight loss, decreased libido, insomnia, muscle spasms, muscle and bone pain, increased yawning and/or sneezing, myoclonus, watery eyes, hot flashes, fever, diarrhea, restlessness, anger, and sadness. This may lead to resumption of use.

Frequent use of high doses of kratom may cause tremors, anorexia, weight loss, seizures, psychosis and other mental health conditions. Kratom use has a small but statistically significant association with externalizing mental health disorders. Kratom use may worsen existing mental health conditions. In case reports associating kratom use with psychosis, it remains unclear whether kratom use directly caused psychosis or simply unmasked the condition. Serious toxicity is relatively rare and generally appears at high doses or when kratom is used with other substances. Herb–drug interactions may result when kratom is combined with alcohol, sedatives, benzodiazepines, opioids, caffeine, cocaine, yohimbine, or monoamine oxidase inhibitors (MAOIs). Rhabdomyolysis is one of the rare and serious complications of this herb at high dosage.

In July 2016, the Centers for Disease Control issued a report stating that between 2010 and 2015, US poison control centers received 660 reports of exposure to kratom. Medical outcomes associated with kratom exposure were reported as minor (minimal signs or symptoms, which resolved rapidly with no residual disability) for 162 (24.5%) exposures, moderate (non-life-threatening, with no residual disability, but requiring some form of treatment) for 275 (41.7%) exposures, and major (life-threatening signs or symptoms, with some residual disability) for 49 (7.4%) exposures. Overall, 92.6% of outcomes were resolved with no residual disability. One death was reported in a person who was exposed to the medications paroxetine (an antidepressant) and lamotrigine (an anticonvulsant and mood stabilizer) in addition to kratom. For 173 (26.2%) exposure calls, no effects were reported, or poison center staff members were unable to follow up regarding effects.

A 2019 report from the American Association of Poison Control Centers (AAPCC) noted that kratom use was increasing rapidly, with 1807 kratom exposures and a 52-fold increase occurring over the years 2011 to 2017. Most exposures occurred intentionally by adult males in their homes, with 32% of the incidents requiring admission to a health care facility and half of the admissions as a serious medical condition. Multiple-substance exposures were associated with a higher number of hospitalizations than kratom-only exposures and involved 11 deaths, including two due to kratom alone. Post-mortem toxicology testing detected multiple substances for almost all those who died, with fentanyl and fentanyl analogs being the most frequently identified co-occurring substances.

Overdoses of kratom are managed similarly to other opioid overdoses, and naloxone can be considered to treat an overdose that results in a reduced impulse to breathe, despite mixed results for its utility, based on animal models.

From October 2017 to February 2018 in the United States, 28 people in 20 different states were infected with salmonella, an outbreak linked to the consumption of contaminated pills, powder, tea, or unidentified sources of kratom. An analytical method using whole genome sequencing applied to samples from the infected users indicated that the salmonella outbreak likely had a common kratom source.

=== Addiction ===
Kratom is a botanical with a known addiction liability and, in vulnerable individuals, dependence may develop rather quickly with tolerance noted at three months and four- to ten-fold dose escalations required within the first few weeks. A survey by Stanciu et al. of kratom consumers found that 25.5% of respondents reported symptoms consistent with a substance use disorder (SUD) diagnosis based on the Diagnostic and Statistical Manual of Mental Disorders' criteria. After controlling for variables such as age, gender, daily kratom use frequency, and a history of substance use disorders or mental health conditions, individuals with a concurrent diagnosis of another substance use disorder had 2.83 times the odds of meeting criteria for kratom addiction compared to those without a concurrent SUD diagnosis. Kratom addiction carries a relapse risk as high as 78–89% at three months post-cessation. In cases of severe addiction, an approach similar to the treatment of opioid addiction may be warranted.

=== Respiratory depression ===
Respiratory depression is the leading cause of death from opioid use. Although evidence is sparse, the risk of respiratory depression caused by taking kratom appears to be low, but, as of 2016, the Food and Drug Administration listed respiratory depression as a concern. A 2018 review found that the alkaloids in kratom do not induce respiratory depression.

=== Liver toxicity ===
Chronic use of kratom can be hepatotoxic, and may cause acute liver injury; symptoms include abdominal discomfort, dark urine, itching and jaundice. Liver injury has been reported with a latency (time from first use to the onset of symptoms) of median 20.6 days. Reported liver biopsies tend to show cholestasis; however, blood biomarkers can show a range of cholestatic, mixed, or hepatocellular injury patterns. Although cases are likely underreported, many users do not seem to develop liver injury, and it is unclear which users are at heightened risk. The mechanism by which kratom causes liver damage in some people is unknown and poorly studied, but a model has been proposed.

=== Infants ===
Neonatal abstinence syndrome has been noted in infants born to mothers taking kratom during pregnancy. These infants display similar symptoms to infants born with opioid withdrawal syndrome, such as jitteriness, reduced feeding, irritability, and sleeplessness. Infants impacted by kratom withdrawal may require hospitalization and pharmacologic weaning using morphine. Although morphine treatment was effective in most reported cases, little is known about the best dosing and medication schedule to mitigate withdrawal symptoms. Although most affected infants in the literature were born to mothers taking daily doses of kratom, it is unknown what degree of kratom use can cause neonatal abstinence syndrome. It is recommended that mothers taking kratom work with their physician to discontinue kratom usage.

=== Death ===
Kratom overdose is a subject of concern in many countries because of the associated rising number of hospitalizations and deaths in which chronic kratom use is a contributing factor. According to clinical reviews, a kratom overdose can cause liver toxicity, seizures, coma, and death, especially in combination with excessive alcohol use. Between 2011 and 2017, 44 U.S. deaths were kratom-related. However, many cases could not be fully assessed, due to limited information. People who die from kratom use typically have taken it in combination with other substances, or have underlying health conditions.

Over 18 months in 2016 and 2017, 152 overdose deaths involving kratom were reported in the United States, with kratom as the primary overdose agent in 91 of the deaths, and 7 with kratom being the only agent detected. Nine deaths occurred in Sweden during 2010–11 relating to use of Krypton, a mixture of kratom, caffeine and O-desmethyltramadol, a metabolite of the opioid analgesic tramadol. Between 2020 and 2024, the Centers for Disease Control and Prevention found that kratom was involved in over 5,200 fatal overdoses in the United States.

== Pharmacology ==
Mitragyna speciosa alkaloids at opioid receptors
Compound	Affinities (K_{i} (nM))			Ratio	Ref
Compound	MOR	DOR	KOR	MOR:DOR:KOR	Ref
7-Hydroxymitragynine	13.5	155	123	1:11:9	
Mitragynine	7.24	60.3	1,100	1:8:152	
Mitragynine pseudoindoxyl	0.087	3.02	79.4	1:35:913	

Kratom contains at least 54 alkaloids. These include mitragynine, 7-hydroxymitragynine (7-HMG), speciociliatine, paynantheine, corynantheidine, speciogynine, mitraphylline, rhynchophylline, mitralactonal, raubasine, and mitragynaline. The alkaloids mitragynine and 7-hydroxymitragynine are responsible for many of the complex effects of kratom, but other alkaloids may also contribute synergistically.

The effects of both mitragynine and 7-HMG remain disputed despite substantial study. Both are partial agonists of the μ-opioid receptor. While most data indicates agonism at all three opioid receptors, other data suggests the alkaloids are antagonists of the δ-opioid receptor with low affinity for the κ-opioid receptor. 7-HMG appears to have higher affinity at the μ-opioid receptor than mitragynine. These compounds display functional selectivity and do not activate the β-arrestin pathway which may be partly responsible for the respiratory depression, constipation, and sedation associated with traditional opioids. Both mitragynine and 7-HMG readily cross the blood–brain barrier.

Mitragynine also appears to inhibit COX-2, block L-type and T-type calcium channels, and interact with other receptors in the brain including 5-HT_{2C} and 5-HT_{7} serotonin receptors, D_{2} dopamine receptors, and A_{2A} adenosine receptors. Mitragynine stimulates α_{2}-adrenergic receptors, inhibiting the release of norepinephrine (noradrenaline); other compounds in this class include dexmedetomidine, which is used for sedation, and clonidine, which is used to manage anxiety and some symptoms of opioid withdrawal. This activity might explain why kratom can be dangerous when used in combination with other sedatives. Kratom also contains rhynchophylline, a non-competitive NMDA receptor antagonist.

Mitragynine is metabolized in humans via phase I and phase II mechanisms with the resulting metabolites excreted in urine. In in vitro experiments, kratom extracts inhibited CYP3A4, CYP2D6, and CYP1A2 enzymes, which results in significant potential for drug interactions.

Table 1: Pharmaceutical profile of kratom
Kratom (Mitragynine, 7-Hydroxy-Mitragynine, Speciogynine, Paynantheine, Speciociliatine, Corynantheidine, Corynoxeine, Corynoxine B, Speciofoline)
Bioavailability:	PO estimated at 30%
Onset:	PO: 30 minutes
Peak plasma time:	1–4.5 hrs
Duration:	3 or more hours
Half-life:	12–45 hours
Receptors:	Kappa: competitive antagonist; Delta: competitive antagonist; Mu: partial agonist; α2 adrenergic; Adenosine A2a; Dopamine D2; Serotonin receptors 5-HT2C and 5-HT7
Mechanism of action:	Competitive antagonist at Kappa opioid receptors with stronger affinity compared to other receptors, competitive antagonist at Delta opioid receptors. Partial agonist at Mu opioid receptors. Causes G-protein linked second messenger activation, and calcium channel blocker.
Metabolism:	Cytochrome P-450, inhibitor of CYP2D6 and CYP3A
Excretion:	Renally

== Chemistry ==
Many of the key psychoactive compounds in M. speciosa are indole alkaloids related to mitragynine, which is a tetracyclic relative of the pentacyclic indole alkaloids, yohimbine and voacangine. In particular, mitragynine and 7-hydroxymitragynine (7-HMG) compose significant proportions of the natural products isolable from M. speciosa; e.g., in one study, mitragynine was 12% by weight from Malaysian leaf sources, versus 66% from Thai sources, and 7-hydroxymitragynine constituted ~2% by weight. At least 40 other compounds have been isolated from M. speciosa leaves, including ~25 additional alkaloids, including raubasine/ajmalicine (originally isolated from Rauvolfia serpentina), corynantheidine (also found in Corynanthe johimbe), as well as mitraphylline, mitragynine pseudoindoxyl, and rhynchophylline.

In addition to alkaloids, M. speciosa produces many other secondary metabolites. These include various saponins, iridoids and other monoterpenoids, triterpenoids such as ursolic acid and oleanic acid, as well as various polyphenols including the flavonoids apigenin and quercetin. Although some of these compounds possess antinociceptive, anti-inflammatory, gastrointestinal, antidepressant, antioxidant, and antibacterial effects in cells and non-human animals, there is no sufficient evidence to support the clinical use of kratom in humans.

=== Detection in body fluids ===
The plant's active compounds and metabolites are not detected by a typical drug screening test but can be detected by more specialized testing. Blood mitragynine concentrations are expected to be in a range of 10–50 μg/L in persons using the drug recreationally. Detection in body fluids is typically by liquid chromatography-mass spectrometry.

== Regulation ==
Kratom status by country. As of November 2026: Illegal; Prescription required; Legal only not for human consumption; Legal and regulated; Legal and unregulated

As of January 2018, neither the plant nor its alkaloids were listed in any of the Schedules of the United Nations Drug Conventions.

In 2021, the World Health Organization's Executive Committee on Drug Dependency investigated the risks of kratom and declined to recommend a critical review of it. The committee, however, recommended kratom be kept "under surveillance".

=== ASEAN ===
As of 2013, kratom was listed by ASEAN in its annex of products that cannot be included in traditional medicines and health supplements that are traded across ASEAN nations.

=== Australia and New Zealand ===
Mitragyna speciosa is a prohibited substance in Australia. In New Zealand, Mitragyna speciosa is designated a prescription medicine, and its use in herbal remedies is prohibited under section 2 of the Medicines Act 1981.

=== Canada ===
As of October 2020, Health Canada disallowed marketing of kratom for any use by ingestion and has taken action against companies marketing it for such purposes. Kratom can also be marketed for other uses, such as incense.

=== UK and Ireland ===
In the Republic of Ireland in 2017, kratom was designated a Schedule 1 illegal drug (the highest level), under the names 7-hydroxymitragynine and mitragynine.

In the United Kingdom, the sale, import, and export of kratom intended for human consumption is prohibited under the Psychoactive Substances Act 2016, which broadly includes any substance that "produces a psychoactive effect".

=== Continental Europe ===
As of 2011, the plant was controlled in Denmark, Latvia, Lithuania, Poland, Romania, and Sweden.

In Bulgaria and Norway, kratom is a controlled substance.

In the Czech Republic, regulated sales of kratom and kratom extracts became legal starting in July 2025.

In Finland, scheduled in the "government decree on psychoactive substances banned from the consumer market".

=== Indonesia ===
Kratom was scheduled to become an illegal substance in Indonesia in 2024 once new regulations from the Indonesian National Narcotics Agency (BNN) go into effect. In 2024, a revision to a regulation by Ministry of Trade legalized production and export of kratom leaves. In September 2024, Indonesia's Ministry of Cooperatives and Small Medium Business stated that Indonesia will start building downstream industries for kratom exports. These developments made kratom legal to export and manufacture in Indonesia.

=== Japan ===
Kratom is classified as a designated drug, and its manufacture, import, possession, and use, are illegal in Japan.

=== Malaysia ===
Kratom leaves, known locally as ketum or Biak, are prohibited to use, import, export, manufacture, compound, mix, dispense, sell, supply, administer or possess in Malaysia and can be punished by imprisonment or fine or both. Although prohibited by statute, the use of kratom remains widely spread especially in Northern and East Coast region of Malaysia's Peninsula, because the tree grows natively and tea decoctions are readily available in local communities. Certain parties have urged the government to penalize the use of kratom under the Dangerous Drugs Act instead of the Poisons Act, which would carry heavier penalties.

=== South America ===
Argentina banned kratom in 2017.

Chile banned kratom in 2021.

Brazil listed kratom as a New Psychoactive Substance (NPS) in 2020. It remains legal until it is included among prohibited substances.

=== Thailand ===
Possession of kratom was illegal in Thailand until 2018. The Thai government had passed the Kratom Act 2486, effective August 1943, which made planting the tree illegal, in response to a rise in its use when opium became very expensive in Thailand and the government was attempting to gain control of the opium market. In 1979, the government placed kratom, along with cannabis, in Category V of a five-category classification of narcotics. Kratom accounted for less than two percent of arrests for narcotics between 1987 and 1992.

The Thai government has considered legalizing kratom for recreational use in 2004, 2009, 2013, and 2020. In 2018, Thailand became the first Southeast Asian country to legalize kratom for medical purposes. In 2021, Thailand fully legalized kratom and removed it from the list of Category V narcotics. More than 12,000 people who had been convicted for kratom-related offences when it was still considered a narcotic were granted an amnesty.

=== United States ===
In 2014, the United States Food and Drug Administration (FDA) banned the import of kratom into the U.S. due to a lack of evidence for its safety. As of 2026, kratom is illegal in ten states: Alabama, Arkansas, Connecticut, Indiana, Kansas, Louisiana, Rhode Island, Vermont, Massachusetts, and Wisconsin, and it may be outlawed by local ordinance in other states. As of early 2026, the states of Iowa, Nebraska, and South Dakota introduced bills with legislation that would ban kratom, while Iowa and Nebraska would also classify kratom as a Schedule I drug. In August 2026, "all forms of kratom" were banned in the state of Massachusetts under an emergency order by the governor that lasts up to one year.

In December 2025, Ohio temporarily banned kratom-related products for 180 days, with the Ohio Board of Pharmacy moving toward a permanent ban on all forms of kratom by mid-2026. In late 2025, California Governor Gavin Newsom's administration began warning retailers that it is illegal to sell or manufacture kratom, which led to Los Angeles County banning kratom and Orange County significantly restricting kratom by banning synthetic or concentrated kratom products containing more than 2% 7-hydroxymitragynine. In 2016, kratom was banned in San Diego and Oceanside, California.

In late 2017, there was consideration to make kratom a federal Schedule I drug. In June 2018, the US House of Representatives passed the Stop the Importation and Trafficking of Synthetic Analogues (SITSA) Act. It was introduced in the Senate and referred to the Judiciary Committee, but no further action was taken. In 2019, the FDA warned consumers that kratom remains unapproved for interstate commerce for use as a drug, may be unsafe in commercially available products, and is on an import alert, which can lead to confiscation of imported supplies. Efforts to schedule kratom generated significant controversy, both among the general public and the scientific community, and were ultimately unsuccessful.

In August 2025, Florida Attorney General James Uthmeier announced an emergency rule placing 7-hydroxymitragynine into Schedule I status under Florida state law, without any mention of a carve out or any exclusions for Mitragyna speciosa which contains low amounts of 7OH, effectively making kratom illegal in Florida.

On April 10, 2026, Kansas Governor Laura Kelly signed a bill into law banning the sale and possession of all kratom products in the state, including 7-OH, effective July 1, 2026.

North Dakota also banned kratom, effective August 5, 2026, via an executive order from the governor and also an emergency rule from the pharmacy board. Subsequently, the legislature passed a law banning synthetic kratom but allowing natural kratom to be sold to those over 21, along with requiring labeling and imposing marketing restrictions. This law was signed by the state's governor on September 4 2026, but kratom is still banned until regulations under the new law are issued.

On July 1, 2026, it was reported that Markwayne Mullin, the Secretary of Homeland Security at that time, held an investment "worth as much as $1 million in Botanic Tonics, which could benefit from the new restrictions by facing less competition in the kratom market".

==== US FDA assessment ====
In April 2019, the United States Food and Drug Administration (FDA) issued a statement declaring that kratom was not approved for any medical use, was potentially unsafe in commercial products available in the United States, and remained on an import alert where imported supplies would be confiscated. On April 4, 2018, the FDA issued the first mandatory recall in its history over concerns of salmonella contamination of several kratom-containing products. Samples of the products, manufactured by Triangle Pharmanaturals, and marketed under the brand name 'Raw Form Organics', tested positive for contamination and the manufacturer did not comply with federal requests for voluntary recall. FDA Commissioner Gottlieb stated that the recall was "...based on the imminent health risk posed by the contamination of this product with salmonella" and not related to other regulatory concerns. Consumers were advised to immediately discard any such products to prevent serious health risks.

In February 2018, the commissioner of the FDA, Scott Gottlieb, released a statement describing further opioid-like properties of kratom and stating that it should not be used for any medical treatment or recreational use. Also in 2018, the FDA supervised the voluntary destruction of kratom dietary supplements by a nationwide distributor in Missouri, and encouraged all companies involved in kratom commerce to remove their products from the market. On February 26, the FDA warned a California manufacturer of a kratom product called "Mitrasafe" that the supplement was not confirmed as safe, was not approved as a dietary supplement or drug, and was illegal for interstate commerce.

Although it was a federally legal dietary supplement, kratom was not approved as a therapeutic agent in the United States due to the poor quality of the research. In November 2017, the FDA cited serious concerns over the marketing and effects (including death) associated with the use of kratom in the United States, stating that "There is no reliable evidence to support the use of kratom as a treatment for opioid use disorder; there are currently no FDA-approved therapeutic uses of kratom... and the FDA has evidence to show that there are significant safety issues associated with its use."

==== US DEA scheduling proposal ====
In August 2016, the United States Drug Enforcement Administration (DEA) announced its intention to place the active materials in the kratom plant into Schedule I of the Controlled Substances Act as a warning about an imminent hazard to public safety, citing over 600 calls to poison control centers between 2010 and 2015, and 15 kratom-related deaths between 2014 and 2016. This drew strong protests among those using kratom to deal with chronic pain or wean themselves off opioids or alcohol. A group of 51 members of the U.S. House of Representatives and a group of nine Senators each sent letters to acting DEA administrator Chuck Rosenberg protesting the listing. Around 140,000 people signed an online White House Petition protesting it.

The DEA noted the responses but said that it intended to go forward with the listing; a spokesman said: "We can't rely upon public opinion and anecdotal evidence. We have to rely upon science." In October 2016, the DEA withdrew its notice of intent while inviting public comments over a review period ending in December 2016. As of July 2016, Alabama, Arkansas, Indiana, Vermont, and Wisconsin had made kratom illegal, and the US Army had forbidden soldiers from using it. Between February 2014 and July 2016, U.S. law-enforcement authorities "encountered 55 tons of kratom," or roughly "50 million individual doses," according to the International Narcotics Control Board.

In the July 2, 2026 issue of Federal Register (21 FR 1308), the federal government of the United States (through the Administrator of the Drug Enforcement Administration) issued a notice of intent to publish a temporary order to schedule three 7-hydroxymitragynine-related substances (mitragynine pseudoindoxyl, MGM-15, and MGM-16) under schedule I of the Controlled Substances Act. If issued, the temporary scheduling order will impose the regulatory controls and administrative, civil, and criminal sanctions applicable to schedule I controlled substances on persons who handle (manufacture, distribute, reverse distribute, import, export, engage in research, conduct instructional activities or chemical analysis with, or possess) or propose to handle these three 7-hydroxymitragynine-related substances.

==== FDA public response ====
The US Food and Drug Administration's (FDA) arguments for the federal prohibition of kratom have drawn both criticism and support. FDA commissioner Gottlieb responded to criticism in 2018 by stating that "The FDA has done an exhaustive review of adverse event reports, clinical literature and other sources of information related to kratom." However, in 2021, former Acting Commissioner of Food and Drugs Brett Giroir claimed that the FDA's recommendation to schedule kratom was rejected because of "embarrassingly poor evidence [and] data".

The FDA's position on kratom has also been criticized by the American Kratom Association and researchers including Walter Prozialeck. Former commissioner Gottlieb continued to defend the agency's position in 2021, stating that he was convinced that kratom was fueling the U.S. opioid epidemic, though Gottlieb's partiality has been called into question as he has since gone on to become a member of the board of directors of Pfizer Inc., a company that has been heavily criticized for its sale and marketing of opioid drugs.

== Research ==
Kratom is under preliminary research for possible antipsychotic and antidepressant properties, as well as pain management, withdrawal management, and dependence reduction.

Kratom use has not been shown to positively affect mental health and shows a very small association with negative indicators (mainly externalizing disorders).

== See also ==
- Deumitragynine
- Pausinystalia johimbe
