= C33H38N2O =

The molecular formula C_{33}H_{38}N_{2}O (molar mass: 478.67 g/mol, exact mass: 478.2984 u) may refer to:

- RWJ-394674
