= C23H32N2O5 =

The molecular formula C_{23}H_{32}N_{2}O_{5} (molar mass : 416.518 g/mol) may refer to:

- MGM-15
- Ramipril
