= Mitragynine pseudoindoxyl =

Opioid analgesic compound

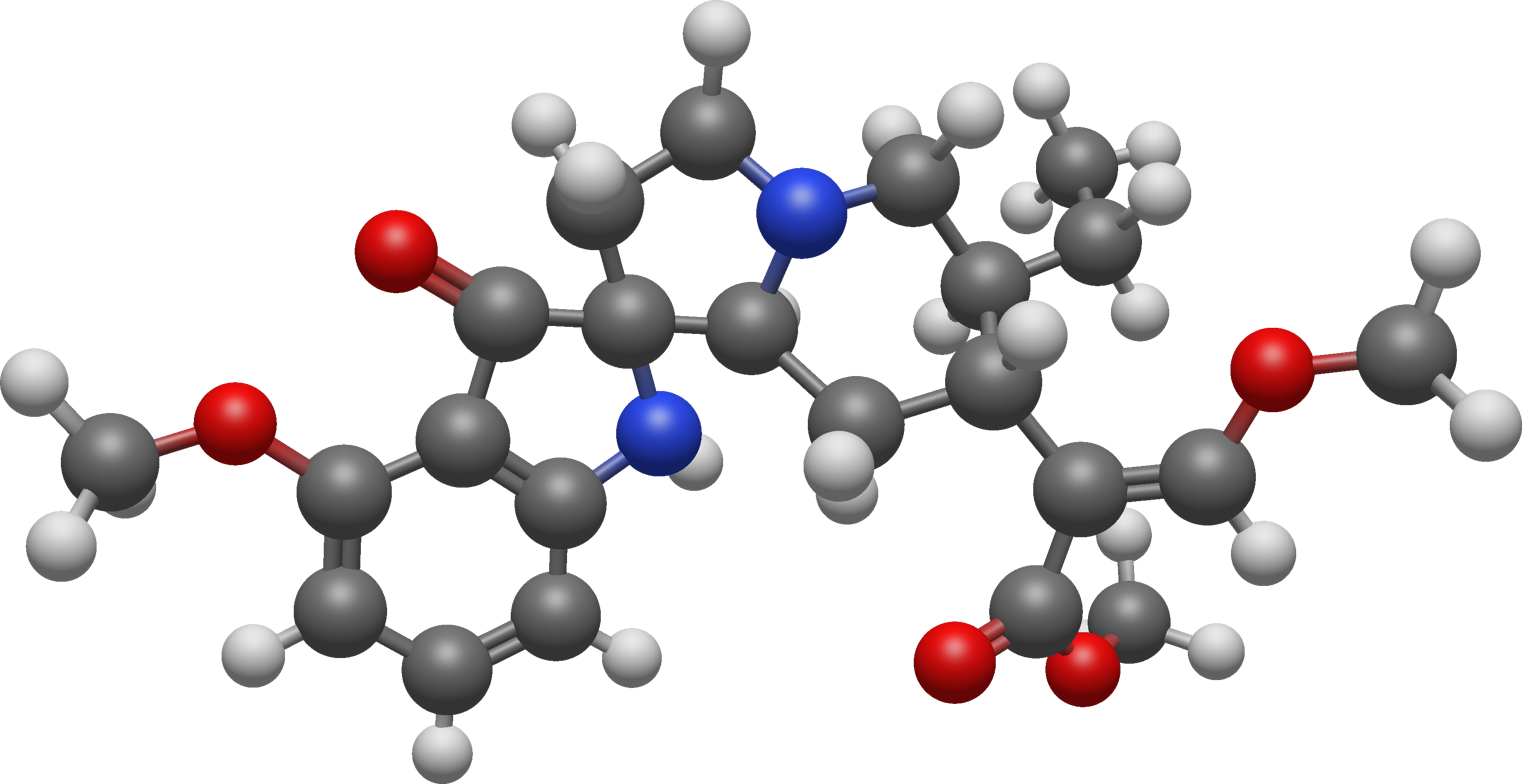

Clinical data
- Other names: Spiro(2H-indole-2,1'(5'H)-indolizine)-7'-acetic acid, 6'-ethyl-1,2',3,3',6',7',8',8'a-octahydro-4-methoxy-alpha-(methoxymethylene)-3-oxo-, methyl ester, (alphaE,1'S,6'S,7'S,8'as)-
- ATC code: None

Legal status
- Legal status: US: Schedule I

Identifiers
- IUPAC name: methyl (2E)-2-[(1′S,6′S,7′S,8′aS)-6′-ethyl-4-methoxy-3-oxo-1,2′,3,3′,6′,7′,8′,8′a-octahydro-5′H-spiro[indole-2,1′-indolizin]-7′-yl]-3-methoxyprop-2-enoate
- CAS Number: 2035457-43-1
- PubChem CID: 44301701
- ChemSpider: 23152339
- UNII: BKA67VHE3B
- ChEMBL: ChEMBL58362
- CompTox Dashboard (EPA): DTXSID101045678

Chemical and physical data
- Formula: C_{23}H_{30}N_{2}O_{5}
- Molar mass: 414.502 g·mol^{−1}
- 3D model (JSmol): Interactive image
- SMILES: CC[C@H](C1)[C@](/C(C(OC)=O)=C\OC)([H])C[C@@](N1CC2)([H])[C@]32NC4=CC=CC(OC)=C4C3=O
- InChI: InChI=1S/C23H30N2O5/c1-5-14-12-25-10-9-23(19(25)11-15(14)16(13-28-2)22(27)30-4)21(26)20-17(24-23)7-6-8-18(20)29-3/h6-8,13-15,19,24H,5,9-12H2,1-4H3/b16-13+/t14-,15+,19+,23+/m1/s1; Key:BAEJBRCYKACTAA-WGUOAFTMSA-N

Mitragynine pseudoindoxyl is a rearrangement product of 7-hydroxymitragynine, an active metabolite of mitragynine.

Mitragynine pseudoindoxyl can be produced in the blood as a metabolite of 7-hydroxymitragynine.

== Pharmacology ==
Mitragynine pseudoindoxyl is a μ-opioid receptor agonist and δ-opioid receptor antagonist. Animal studies have shown it causes reduced tolerance, withdrawal, and respiratory depression compared to morphine. Respiratory depression is the primary cause of death in the vast numbers of fatalities linked to fentanyl and other opioids. As an atypical analgesic it has a remarkably strong affinity for the MOR (0.087nM), compared with mitragynine at 7.24nM and 7-hydroxymitragynine at 13.5nM (lower figure means stronger binding). This substance has great potential on its own or as a starting point in the development of new and safer opioids.

There are currently no documented overdose deaths as a result of usage of the pure substance. However, recreational use of the isolated alkaloid is rare, as it is typically sold for recreational use in a mixture that also contains 7-hydroxymitragynine.

This alkaloid may be a biased agonist at the μ-opioid receptor; this may explain the more favorable side effect profile found in some research.

However, a 2020 review of these and more recent studies has found issues with some methods originally used to determine ligands to be G protein biased. Oliceridine, thought to be the prototypical G protein biased μ-opioid receptor agonist, along with PZM21 and buprenorphine, were found to be unbiased. Rather, their low intrinsic efficacy interfered with the results of highly amplified assays. There is also significant doubt about whether β-arrestin is truly responsible for the side effects of opioids, and positive results suggesting G-protein activation may still produce constipation, respiratory depression, and tolerance. In summary, mitragynine pseudoindoxyl may still have a better therapeutic window compared to other full agonists, including other putatively biased G-protein agonists, but more research is needed to quantify this effect, particularly in humans, and to elucidate the cause.

Cryo-EM structures of the μOR-Gi1 complex with mitragynine pseudoindoxyl and lofentanil (one of the most potent opioids) revealed that the two ligands engage distinct subpockets, and molecular dynamics simulations showed additional differences in the binding site that promote distinct active-state conformations on the intracellular side of the receptor where G proteins and β-arrestins bind. Importantly, studies have shown that oxidative metabolism is capable of transforming mitragynine (the main alkaloid in kratom) into mitragynine pseudoindoxyl in two steps, which is likely to influence kratom's complex pharmacological effects.

== Chemistry ==
Mitragynine pseudoindoxyl was first accessible via biomimetic semisynthesis from mitragynine. Total synthesis of an unnatural analogue was reported featuring an interrupted Ugi reaction as the key step. Scalable and modular total synthesis of the natural product has also been accomplished using a chiral pool based strategy. This study also demonstrated structural plasticity in biological systems.

== Legal status ==
=== United States ===
In the 2 July 2026 issue of Federal Register (21 FR 1308), the federal government of the United States issued a notice of intent to publish a temporary order to schedule three 7-hydroxymitragynine-related substances (mitragynine pseudoindoxyl, MGM-15, and MGM-16) under Schedule I of the Controlled Substances Act and, as of August 26, 2026, this order is in effect but contains a two-year sunset provision.

== See also ==
- Mitraphylline
- Mitragyna speciosa (Kratom)
- Deuterated mitragynine
