= ARM390 =

Opioid-analgesic compound

AR-M 1000390

Clinical data
- Other names: ARM-390

Identifiers
- CAS Number: 209808-01-5 209808-47-9 (HCl)
- PubChem CID: 9841259
- IUPHAR/BPS: 9005
- ChemSpider: 8016974

Chemical and physical data
- Formula: C_{23}H_{28}N_{2}O
- Molar mass: 348.490 g·mol^{−1}
- 3D model (JSmol): Interactive image
- SMILES: CCN(CC)C(=O)C1=CC=C(C=C1)C(=C2CCNCC2)C3=CC=CC=C3
- InChI: InChI=1S/C23H28N2O/c1-3-25(4-2)23(26)21-12-10-19(11-13-21)22(18-8-6-5-7-9-18)20-14-16-24-17-15-20/h5-13,24H,3-4,14-17H2,1-2H3; Key:SMUGAZNLKPFBSB-UHFFFAOYSA-N

ARM-390 is an opioid-analgesic compound selective for the delta opioid receptor.

It is an exceptionally selective, potent δ opioid receptor agonist with an EC_{50} of 7.2±0.9 nM for δ agonist potency.

In contrast to the delta-opioid selective agonist SNC-80, ARM390 was not found to produce receptor desensitization following multiple administrations. Although behavioral desensitization formed to the analgesic effect of ARM390 through a receptor internalization-independent mechanism, anxiolytic effects persisted during long-term treatment. ARM390 has been dubbed a "low-internalizing agonist" of delta opioid receptors.
