= C25H32N2O6 =

The molecular formula C_{25}H_{32}N_{2}O_{6} (molar mass: 454.52 g/mol) may refer to:

- 7-Acetoxymitragynine
- β-Funaltrexamine
- Vindoline
