= 7-Acetoxymitragynine =

Chemical compound

Identifiers
- IUPAC name: Methyl (E)-2-[(2S,3S,7aS,12bS)-7a-acetyloxy-3-ethyl-8-methoxy-2,3,4,6,7,12b-hexahydro-1H-indolo[2,3-a]quinolizin-2-yl]-3-methoxyprop-2-enoate
- CAS Number: 174418-81-6
- PubChem CID: 11015924
- UNII: KJD0WGJ0NY

Chemical and physical data
- Formula: C_{25}H_{32}N_{2}O_{6}
- Molar mass: 456.539 g·mol^{−1}
- 3D model (JSmol): Interactive image
- SMILES: CC[C@@H]1CN2CC[C@]3(C(=NC4=C3C(=CC=C4)OC)[C@@H]2C[C@@H]1/C(=C\OC)/C(=O)OC)OC(=O)C
- InChI: InChI=1S/C25H32N2O6/c1-6-16-13-27-11-10-25(33-15(2)28)22-19(8-7-9-21(22)31-4)26-23(25)20(27)12-17(16)18(14-30-3)24(29)32-5/h7-9,14,16-17,20H,6,10-13H2,1-5H3/b18-14+/t16-,17+,20+,25+/m1/s1; Key:RJTCCQKAKCMBTR-XBULZMPJSA-N

7-Acetoxymitragynine is an opioid drug which is a semi-synthetic derivative of 7-hydroxymitragynine, a natural product derived from the South-East Asian tree known as kratom. It can be derived by acetylation of the hydroxyl group of 7-hydroxymitragynine, for instance with acetic anhydride, but can also be produced directly from mitragynine by reaction with Lead(IV) acetate. Unlike heroin, 7-acetoxymitragynine is less potent than 7-hydroxymitragynine, but nevertheless retains opioid activity. However It is not commonly or specifically found nor sold.

== See also ==
- MGM-15
- 6-Monoacetylmorphine
