= MGM-15 =

Chemical compound

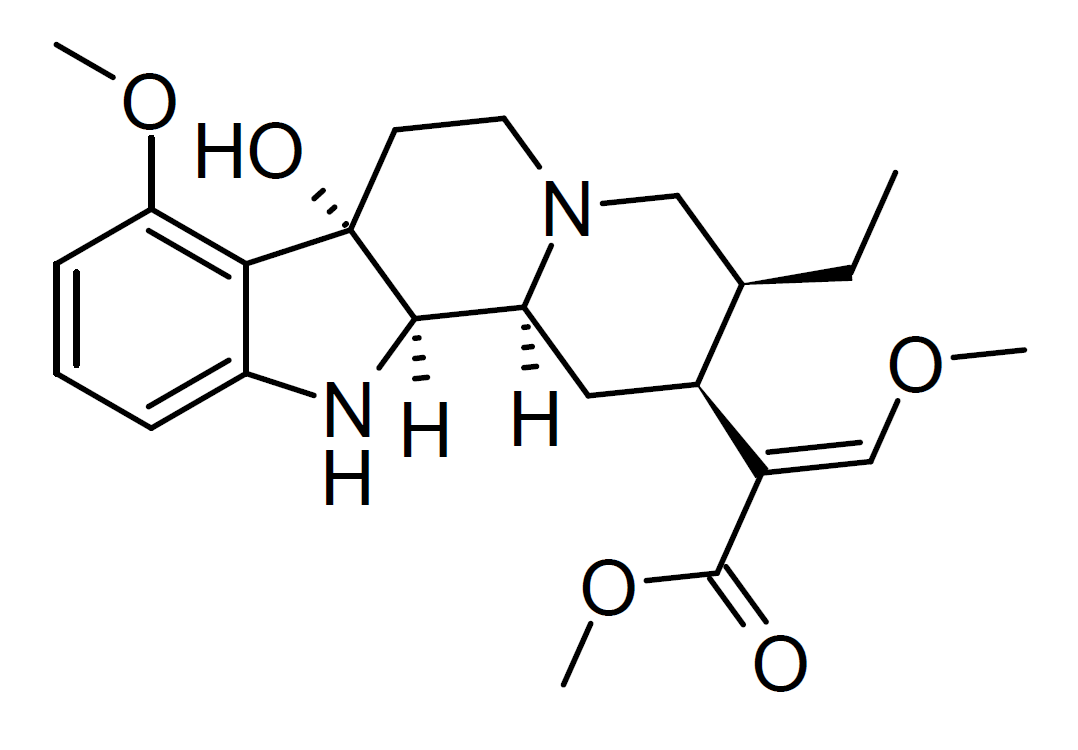

Clinical data
- Other names: Dihydro-7-hydroxy mitragynine
- Drug class: Opioid
- ATC code: None

Legal status
- Legal status: US: Schedule I

Identifiers
- IUPAC name: methyl (E)-2-[(2S,3S,7aS,12aR,12bS)-3-ethyl-7a-hydroxy-8-methoxy-2,3,4,6,7,12,12a,12b-octahydro-1H-indolo[2,3-a]quinolizin-2-yl]-3-methoxyprop-2-enoate
- CAS Number: 1158901-38-2
- PubChem CID: 42629165

Chemical and physical data
- Formula: C_{23}H_{32}N_{2}O_{5}
- Molar mass: 416.518 g·mol^{−1}
- 3D model (JSmol): Interactive image
- SMILES: CC[C@@H]1CN2CC[C@]3([C@@H]([C@@H]2C[C@@H]1/C(=C\OC)/C(=O)OC)NC4=C3C(=CC=C4)OC)O
- InChI: InChI=1S/C23H32N2O5/c1-5-14-12-25-10-9-23(27)20-17(7-6-8-19(20)29-3)24-21(23)18(25)11-15(14)16(13-28-2)22(26)30-4/h6-8,13-15,18,21,24,27H,5,9-12H2,1-4H3/b16-13+/t14-,15+,18+,21-,23+/m1/s1; Key:QXFXDJATKPXTFF-LIMHOZKTSA-N

MGM-15, also known as dihydro-7-hydroxy mitragynine, DH-7OH-MIT is an opioid drug which is a semi-synthetic derivative of 7-hydroxymitragynine, a natural product derived from the Southeast Asian tree kratom. MGM-15 was first reported in 2014. It is the 1,2-dihydro derivative of 7-hydroxymitragynine and shows higher potency as an agonist of the μ-opioid receptor and δ-opioid receptor compared to 7-hydroxymitragynine itself. MGM-15 has been sold as a designer drug since early 2025, initially in the US.

== Legal status ==
=== United States ===
In the 2 July 2026 issue of Federal Register (21 FR 1308), the federal government of the United States (through the Administrator of the Drug Enforcement Administration) issued a notice of intent to publish a temporary order to schedule three 7-hydroxymitragynine-related substances (mitragynine pseudoindoxyl, MGM-15, and MGM-16) under Schedule I of the Controlled Substances Act.

On August 25, 2026, the DEA placed MGM-15 in Schedule I through an emergency temporary scheduling order, making unauthorized possession, manufacture, and distribution illegal.

== See also ==
- Mitragynine
- 7-Acetoxymitragynine
