= DHM =

DHM may refer to:

- Deputy head of mission
- Digital holographic microscopy
- Directed Health Measure
- Deutsche Harmonia Mundi, a record label
- Deutsches Historisches Museum, a museum in Berlin

== Substances ==
- Dihydromuscimol, a GABA_{A} receptor agonist
- MGM-15, an atypical opioid also known as DiHydro-7-hydroxy Mitragynine
- Ampelopsin, also known as dihydromyricetin

== Codes ==
- ISO 639:dhm, Zemba language, in Angola
- Dharamsala airport, IATA code
- Dulwich Hill railway station, Dulwich Hill, South Wales, Australia
- Durham railway station, Durham, Northern England
- Durham-UNH (Amtrak station), New Hampshire, United States
