= BW373U86 =

Opioid analgesic drug used in research

Clinical data
- Other names: (+)-BW373U86

Identifiers
- IUPAC name: 4-[(R)-[(2S,5R)-2,5-dimethyl-4-prop-2-enylpiperazin-1-yl]-(3-hydroxyphenyl)methyl]-N,N-diethylbenzamide
- CAS Number: 150428-54-9
- PubChem CID: 119029
- ChemSpider: 106357
- UNII: RR2QFN29K7
- ChEMBL: ChEMBL25230
- CompTox Dashboard (EPA): DTXSID00933945

Chemical and physical data
- Formula: C_{27}H_{37}N_{3}O_{2}
- Molar mass: 435.612 g·mol^{−1}
- 3D model (JSmol): Interactive image
- SMILES: CCN(CC)C(=O)C1=CC=C(C=C1)C(C2=CC(=CC=C2)O)N3CC(N(CC3C)CC=C)C
- InChI: InChI=1S/C27H37N3O2/c1-6-16-29-18-21(5)30(19-20(29)4)26(24-10-9-11-25(31)17-24)22-12-14-23(15-13-22)27(32)28(7-2)8-3/h6,9-15,17,20-21,26,31H,1,7-8,16,18-19H2,2-5H3/t20-,21+,26-/m1/s1; Key:LBLDMHBSVIVJPM-YZIHRLCOSA-N

(+)-BW373U86 is an opioid analgesic drug used in scientific research.

BW373U86 is a selective agonist for the δ-opioid receptor, with approximately 15× stronger affinity for the δ-opioid than the μ-opioid receptor. It has potent analgesic and antidepressant effects in animal studies. In studies on rats, BW373U86 appears to protect heart muscle cells from apoptosis in conditions of ischemia (oxygen deprivation, such as in heart attack). The mechanism for this is complex and may be separate from its delta agonist effects.

CNS review:

== See also ==
- AZD2327
- DPI-287
- DPI-3290
