= Speciociliatine =

Chemical compound

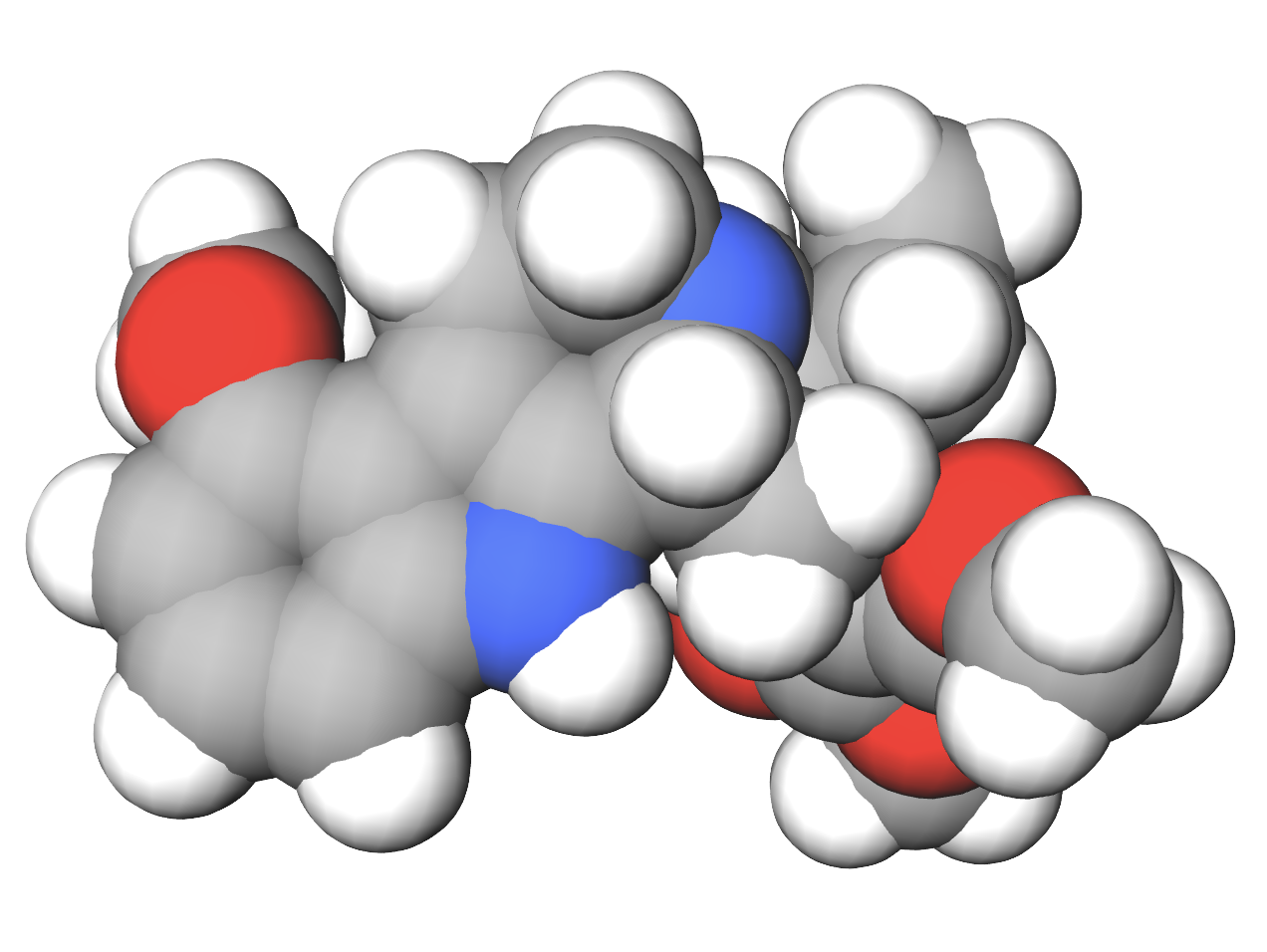

Legal status
- Legal status: US: Unscheduled

Identifiers
- IUPAC name: methyl (E)-2-[(2S,3S,12bR)-3-ethyl-8-methoxy-1,2,3,4,6,7,12,12b-octahydroindolo[2,3-a]quinolizin-2-yl]-3-methoxyprop-2-enoate
- CAS Number: 14382-79-7
- PubChem CID: 5376107
- ChemSpider: 20124314
- UNII: M3NN8Z8ZJW
- ChEMBL: ChEMBL4546925
- CompTox Dashboard (EPA): DTXSID50574160

Chemical and physical data
- Formula: C_{23}H_{30}N_{2}O_{4}
- Molar mass: 398.503 g·mol^{−1}
- 3D model (JSmol): Interactive image
- Melting point: 104 °C
- SMILES: CC[C@@H]1CN2CCC3=C([C@H]2C[C@@H]1/C(=C\OC)/C(=O)OC)NC4=C3C(=CC=C4)OC
- InChI: InChI=1S/C23H30N2O4/c1-5-14-12-25-10-9-15-21-18(7-6-8-20(21)28-3)24-22(15)19(25)11-16(14)17(13-27-2)23(26)29-4/h6-8,13-14,16,19,24H,5,9-12H2,1-4H3/b17-13+/t14-,16+,19-/m1/s1; Key:LELBFTMXCIIKKX-MYLQJJOTSA-N

Speciociliatine is a major alkaloid of the plant Mitragyna speciosa, commonly known as kratom. It is a stereoisomer of mitragynine and constitutes 0.00156 - 2.9% of the dried leaf material.

== Pharmacology ==
=== Pharmacodynamics ===
Speciociliatine has found to be a ligand of the mu and kappa opioid receptors, however findings are varied as to whether it functions as an agonist or a competitive antagonist at those sites.

=== Pharmacokinetics ===
A preliminary pharmacokinetic analysis in male Sprague Dawley rats determined the elimination half-life of Speciociliatine to be 2.6 - 5 hours and the absolute bioavailability to be 20.7% (at an oral dose of 20 mg/kg).
