= DPI-3290 =

Chemical compound

Identifiers
- IUPAC name: 3-[(R)-[(2S,5R)-2,5-dimethyl-4-prop-2-enylpiperazin-1-yl]-(3-hydroxyphenyl)methyl]-N-(3-fluorophenyl)-N-methylbenzamide
- CAS Number: 182417-73-8
- PubChem CID: 9826770
- ChemSpider: 8002513
- UNII: R3UO4Y068S
- ChEMBL: ChEMBL155892

Chemical and physical data
- Formula: C_{30}H_{34}FN_{3}O_{2}
- Molar mass: 487.619 g·mol^{−1}
- 3D model (JSmol): Interactive image
- SMILES: C[C@H]1CN([C@@H](CN1[C@@H](C2=CC(=CC=C2)O)C3=CC=CC(=C3)C(=O)N(C)C4=CC(=CC=C4)F)C)CC=C
- InChI: InChI=1S/C30H34FN3O2/c1-5-15-33-19-22(3)34(20-21(33)2)29(24-10-7-14-28(35)17-24)23-9-6-11-25(16-23)30(36)32(4)27-13-8-12-26(31)18-27/h5-14,16-18,21-22,29,35H,1,15,19-20H2,2-4H3/t21-,22+,29-/m1/s1; Key:LZXRQLIIMYJZDA-UETOGOEVSA-N

DPI-3290 was discovered by scientists at Burroughs Wellcome and licensed to Delta Pharmaceutical and is a drug that is used in scientific research. It is a potent analgesic drug, which produces little respiratory depression.

DPI-3290 acts as an agonist at both μ- and δ-opioid receptor, with an IC50 of 6.2nM at μ and 1.0nM at δ.

== See also ==
- AZD2327
- BW373U86
- DPI-221
- DPI-287
