= DPDPE =

Chemical compound

Clinical data
- Other names: L-Tyrosyl-D-penicillamyl-glycyl-L-phenylalanyl-D-penicillamine (2->5)-disulfide; H-Tyr-D-Pen(1)-Gly-Phe-D-Pen(1)-OH

Identifiers
- IUPAC name: (4S,7S,13S)-13-[[(2S)-2-Amino-3-(4-hydroxyphenyl)propanoyl]amino]-7-benzyl-3,3,14,14-tetramethyl-6,9,12-trioxo-1,2-dithia-5,8,11-triazacyclotetradecane-4-carboxylic acid
- CAS Number: 88373-73-3
- PubChem CID: 104787
- ChemSpider: 94592
- UNII: HB4QD9GL6F
- ChEBI: CHEBI:73356
- ChEMBL: ChEMBL31421
- CompTox Dashboard (EPA): DTXSID201008102

Chemical and physical data
- Formula: C_{30}H_{39}N_{5}O_{7}S_{2}
- Molar mass: 645.79 g·mol^{−1}
- 3D model (JSmol): Interactive image
- SMILES: CC1([C@H](C(=O)NCC(=O)N[C@H](C(=O)N[C@H](C(SS1)(C)C)C(=O)O)CC2=CC=CC=C2)NC(=O)[C@H](CC3=CC=C(C=C3)O)N)C
- InChI: InChI=1S/C30H39N5O7S2/c1-29(2)23(34-25(38)20(31)14-18-10-12-19(36)13-11-18)27(40)32-16-22(37)33-21(15-17-8-6-5-7-9-17)26(39)35-24(28(41)42)30(3,4)44-43-29/h5-13,20-21,23-24,36H,14-16,31H2,1-4H3,(H,32,40)(H,33,37)(H,34,38)(H,35,39)(H,41,42)/t20-,21-,23-,24-/m0/s1; Key:MCMMCRYPQBNCPH-WMIMKTLMSA-N

DPDPE ([D-Pen^{2},D-Pen^{5}]enkephalin) is a synthetic opioid peptide and a selective agonist of the δ-opioid receptor (DOR) which is used in scientific research. It was developed in the early 1980s and was the first highly selective agonist of the DOR to be developed. It was derived from structural modification of met-enkephalin.

== See also ==
- DADLE
- DAMGO
