= Deuterated mitragynine =

Clinical data
- Other names: Deu-mitragynine; Deuterated mitragynine; KUR-101; KUR101
- Routes of administration: Oral
- Drug class: Atypical μ-opioid receptor agonist; Analgesic

Deuterated mitragynine (developmental code name KUR-101) is an atypical μ-opioid receptor agonist and deuterated analogue of mitragynine (found in kratom) which is under development for the treatment of acute pain and opioid-related disorders. It is taken by mouth. Deumitragynine is said to have analgesic effects. The drug is being developed by ATAI Life Sciences and Kures. As of December 2022, it is in phase 1 clinical trials for acute pain and opioid-related disorders.

== See also ==
- List of investigational analgesics
- Mitragyna speciosa (Kratom)
- Mitragynine
- Mitragynine pseudoindoxyl
- 7-Hydroxymitragynine
