= DADLE =

Synthetic opioid analgesic peptide

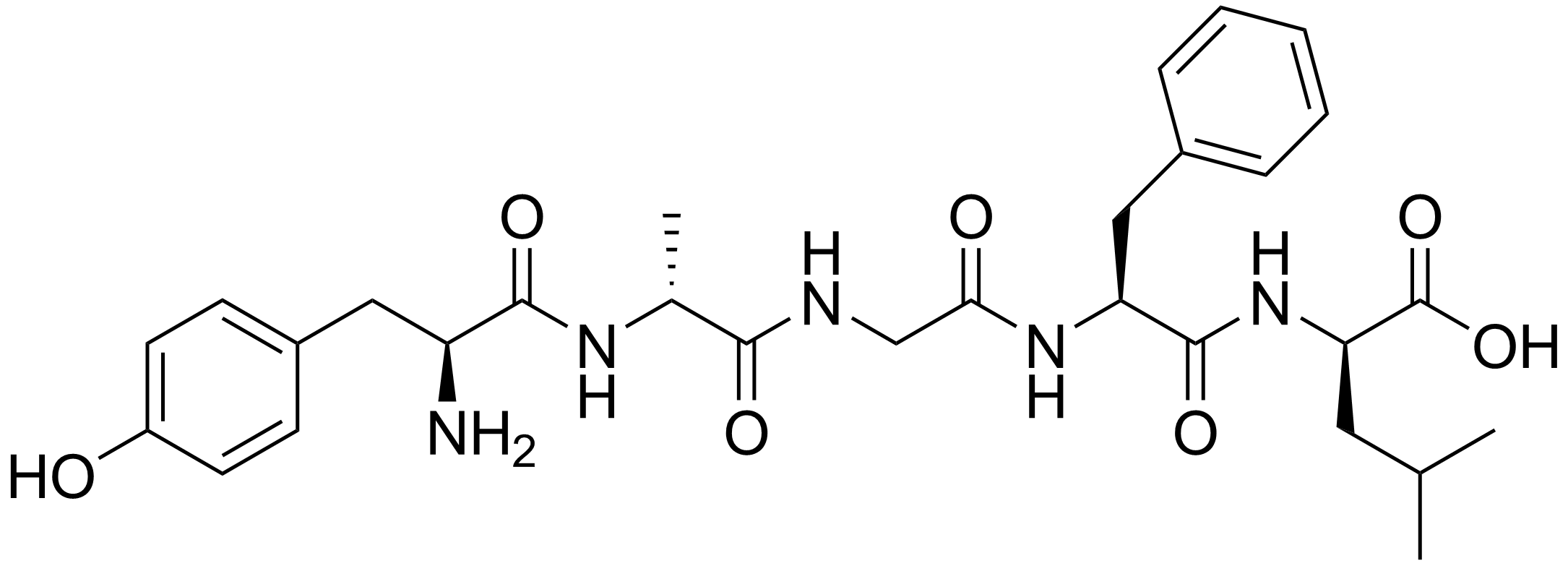

Names
- IUPAC name (2R)-2-[[(2S)-2-[[2-[[(2R)-2-[[(2S)-2-amino-3-(4-hydroxyphenyl)propanoyl]amino]propanoyl]amino]acetyl]amino]-3-phenylpropanoyl]amino]-4-methylpentanoic acid
- Other names • [D-Ala^{2}, D-Leu^{5}]-Enkephalin • L-Tyrosyl-D-alanylglycyl-L-phenylalanyl-D-Leucine • N-(N-(N-(N-L-tyrosyl-D-alanyl)glycyl)-L-phenylalanyl)-D-Leucine • Tyr-D-Ala-Gly-Phe-D-Leu-OH

Identifiers
CAS Number	63631-40-3
3D model (JSmol)	Interactive image
ChEBI	CHEBI:234245
ChEMBL	ChEMBL340032
ChemSpider	5292936
ECHA InfoCard	100.059.337
IUPHAR/BPS	1607
PubChem CID	6917707
UNII	HB4QD9GL6F
- InChI: InChI=1S/C29H39N5O7/c1-17(2)13-24(29(40)41)34-28(39)23(15-19-7-5-4-6-8-19)33-25(36)16-31-26(37)18(3)32-27(38)22(30)14-20-9-11-21(35)12-10-20/h4-12,17-18,22-24,35H,13-16,30H2,1-3H3,(H,31,37)(H,32,38)(H,33,36)(H,34,39)(H,40,41)/t18-,22+,23+,24-/m1/s1 Key: ZHUJMSMQIPIPTF-IBURTVSXSA-N; InChI=1/C29H39N5O7/c1-17(2)13-24(29(40)41)34-28(39)23(15-19-7-5-4-6-8-19)33-25(36)16-31-26(37)18(3)32-27(38)22(30)14-20-9-11-21(35)12-10-20/h4-12,17-18,22-24,35H,13-16,30H2,1-3H3,(H,31,37)(H,32,38)(H,33,36)(H,34,39)(H,40,41)/t18-,22+,23+,24-/m1/s1 Key: ZHUJMSMQIPIPTF-IBURTVSXBS
- SMILES: N[C@H](C(N[C@H](C)C(NCC(N[C@@H](CC1=CC=CC=C1)C(N[C@H](CC(C)C)C(O)=O)=O)=O)=O)=O)CC2=CC=C(O)C=C2

Properties
Chemical formula	C_{29}H_{39}N_{5}O_{7}
Molar mass	569.659 g·mol^{−1}
- Except where otherwise noted, data are given for materials in their standard state (at 25 °C [77 °F], 100 kPa). verify (what is ?) Infobox references

DADLE ([D-Ala^{2}, D-Leu^{5}]-Enkephalin) is a synthetic opioid peptide with analgesic properties. It activates the δ-opioid receptor.

Treatment with DADLE results in transient depression of mean arterial blood pressure and heart rate.

== See also ==
- DAMGO
- DPDPE
