= DPI-287 =

Chemical compound

Identifiers
- IUPAC name: 4-[(R)-[(2S,5R)-2,5-dimethyl-4-benzylpiperazin-1-yl]-(3-hydroxyphenyl)methyl]-N,N-diethylbenzamide
- CAS Number: 519058-13-0
- PubChem CID: 21025820
- CompTox Dashboard (EPA): DTXSID501018407

Chemical and physical data
- Formula: C_{31}H_{39}N_{3}O_{2}
- Molar mass: 485.672 g·mol^{−1}
- 3D model (JSmol): Interactive image
- SMILES: CCN(CC)C(=O)c2ccc(cc2)C(c(ccc4)cc4O)N(CC1C)C(C)CN1Cc3ccccc3

DPI-287 is an opioid drug that is used in scientific research. It is a highly selective agonist for the δ-opioid receptor, which produces less convulsions than most drugs from this family. It has antidepressant-like effects.

== See also ==
- AZD2327
- BW373U86
- DPI-3290
