= TAN-67 =

Chemical compound

Identifiers
- IUPAC name: rel-3-[(4aS,12aR)-2-Methyl-1,3,4,5,12,12a-hexahydropyrido[3,4-b]acridin-4a(2H)-yl]phenol
- CAS Number: 148545-09-9
- PubChem CID: 9950038
- ChemSpider: 8125649
- UNII: UY7TB22PB7
- KEGG: C20168
- ChEMBL: ChEMBL327745

Chemical and physical data
- Formula: C_{23}H_{24}N_{2}O
- Molar mass: 344.458 g·mol^{−1}
- 3D model (JSmol): Interactive image
- SMILES: CN1CC[C@@]2(CC3=NC4=CC=CC=C4C=C3C[C@H]2C1)C5=CC(=CC=C5)O
- InChI: InChI=1S/C23H24N2O/c1-25-10-9-23(18-6-4-7-20(26)13-18)14-22-17(12-19(23)15-25)11-16-5-2-3-8-21(16)24-22/h2-8,11,13,19,26H,9-10,12,14-15H2,1H3/t19-,23+/m0/s1; Key:LEPBHAAYNPPRRA-WMZHIEFXSA-N

TAN-67 (SB-205,607) is an opioid drug used in scientific research that acts as a potent and selective δ-opioid agonist, selective for the δ_{1} subtype. It has analgesic properties and induces dopamine release in nucleus accumbens. It also protects both heart and brain tissue from hypoxic tissue damage through multiple mechanisms involving among others an interaction between δ receptors and mitochondrial K(ATP) channels.
