= GPRASP1 =

Protein-coding gene in humans

Identifiers
- Aliases: GPRASP1, GASP, GASP-1, GASP1, G protein-coupled receptor associated sorting protein 1
- External IDs: OMIM: 300417; MGI: 1917418; GeneCards: GPRASP1

Gene location (Human)
Chr.	X chromosome (human)
Band	Xq22.1	Start	102,651,092 bp
Band	Xq22.1	End	102,659,083 bp

Gene location (Mouse)
Chr.	X chromosome (mouse)
Band	X|X F1	Start	134,643,482 bp
Band	X|X F1	End	134,704,223 bp
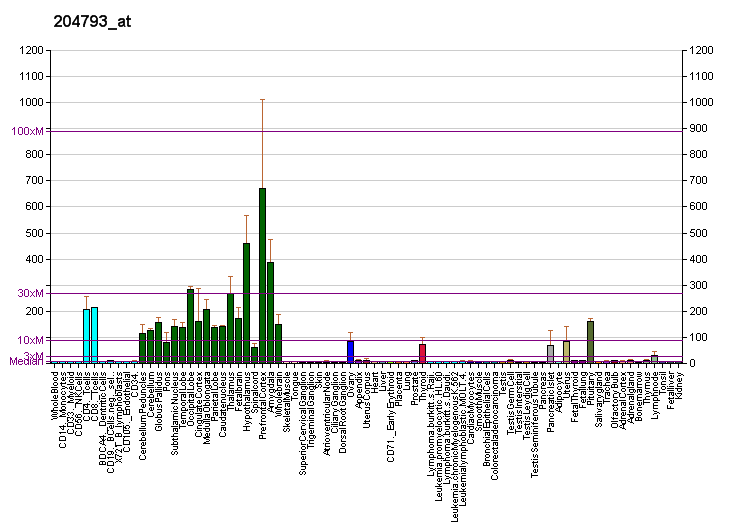
RNA expression pattern
Bgee	Human / Mouse (ortholog); Top expressed in: middle temporal gyrus; Brodmann area 23; endothelial cell; cerebellar vermis; superior frontal gyrus; lateral nuclear group of thalamus; postcentral gyrus; cerebellar hemisphere; right hemisphere of cerebellum; orbitofrontal cortex / Top expressed in: central gray substance of midbrain; nucleus of stria terminalis; paraventricular nucleus of hypothalamus; superior colliculus; arcuate nucleus; dorsomedial hypothalamic nucleus; median eminence; suprachiasmatic nucleus; habenula; ventromedial nucleus; More reference expression data
BioGPS	More reference expression data
Gene ontology
Molecular function	protein binding
Cellular component	cytoplasm; cytosol
Biological process	G protein-coupled receptor catabolic process; endosome to lysosome transport
Sources:Amigo / QuickGO
Orthologs
Databases	NCBI: entry; OMA: entry
Species	Human	Mouse
Entrez	9737	67298
Ensembl	ENSG00000198932	ENSMUSG00000043384
UniProt	Q5JY77	Q5U4C1
RefSeq (mRNA)	NM_014710; NM_001099410; NM_001099411; NM_001184727	NM_001004359; NM_001005385; NM_026081
RefSeq (protein)	NP_001092880; NP_001092881; NP_001171656; NP_055525	NP_001004359; NP_001005385; NP_080357
Location (UCSC)	Chr X: 102.65 – 102.66 Mb	Chr X: 134.64 – 134.7 Mb
PubMed search
- Wikidata
View/Edit Human	View/Edit Mouse

G-protein coupled receptor-associated sorting protein 1 is a protein that in humans is encoded by the GPRASP1 gene.

== Interactions ==
GPRASP1 (gene) has been shown to interact with Delta Opioid receptor.
