= ADL-5747 =

Names
- IUPAC name N,N-diethyl-3-hydroxy-4-spiro[chromene-2,4'-piperidine]-4-ylbenzamide

Identifiers
| CAS Number | 850176-30-6 (freebase); 1187653-56-0 (hydrochloride) |
| 3D model (JSmol) | Interactive image |
| ChEMBL | ChEMBL561339 |
| ChemSpider | 9375258 |
| IUPHAR/BPS | 9003 |
| PubChem CID | 11200189 |
| UNII | BRJ718SA03 |
- InChI: InChI=1S/C24H28N2O3/c1-3-26(4-2)23(28)17-9-10-18(21(27)15-17)20-16-24(11-13-25-14-12-24)29-22-8-6-5-7-19(20)22/h5-10,15-16,25,27H,3-4,11-14H2,1-2H3 Key: ALGHKWSXJUQNJJ-UHFFFAOYSA-N
- SMILES: CCN(CC)C(=O)C1=CC(=C(C=C1)C2=CC3(CCNCC3)OC4=CC=CC=C42)O

Properties
| Chemical formula | C_{24}H_{28}N_{2}O_{3} |
| Molar mass | 392.499 g·mol^{−1} |

Related compounds
| Related compounds | ADL-5859 |
- Except where otherwise noted, data are given for materials in their standard state (at 25 °C [77 °F], 100 kPa). Infobox references

ADL-5747 was a novel opioid analgesic drug, however its development was halted because it did not pass phase II trials.

== Mechanism of action ==
ADL-5747 is an opioid analgesic, it works by activating opioid receptors. However, unlike "classical" opioids such as morphine, it is selective for the delta receptor.

In tests done on mice, ADL-5747 was able to reduce pain in an efficient way. This compound does not seem to cause receptor internalization.
