= RWJ-394674 =

Chemical compound

Legal status
- Legal status: In general: legal

Identifiers
- IUPAC name: N,N-diethyl-4-((8-phenethyl-8-azabicyclo[3.2.1]oct-3-ylidene)phenylmethyl)benzamide
- CAS Number: 359862-85-4
- PubChem CID: 10205965
- ChemSpider: 23158278
- ChEMBL: ChEMBL68113

Chemical and physical data
- Formula: C_{33}H_{38}N_{2}O
- Molar mass: 478.680 g·mol^{−1}
- 3D model (JSmol): Interactive image
- SMILES: CCN(CC)C(=O)c1ccc(cc1)C(=C2C[C@H]3CC[C@@H](C2)N3CCc4ccccc4)c5ccccc5
- InChI: InChI=1S/C33H38N2O/c1-3-34(4-2)33(36)28-17-15-27(16-18-28)32(26-13-9-6-10-14-26)29-23-30-19-20-31(24-29)35(30)22-21-25-11-7-5-8-12-25/h5-18,30-31H,3-4,19-24H2,1-2H3/b32-29-/t30-,31+/m1/s1; Key:ZJOPBPNTQRUJNM-BPVGFELESA-N

RWJ-394674 is a drug that is used in scientific research. It is a potent, orally active analgesic drug that produces little respiratory depression. RWJ-394674 itself is a potent and selective agonist for δ-opioid receptors, with a K_{i} of 0.24 nM at δ and 72 nM at μ. However once inside the body, RWJ-394674 is dealkylated to its monodesethyl metabolite RWJ-413216, which is a potent agonist at the μ-opioid receptor and has less affinity for δ (K_{i} of 0.26 nM at μ, 46.7 nM at δ). The effect of RWJ-394674 when administered in vivo thus produces potent agonist effects at both μ and δ receptors through the combined actions of the parent drug and its active metabolite, with the δ-agonist effects counteracting the respiratory depression from the μ-opioid effects, and the only prominent side-effect being sedation.
