= ADL-5859 =

Selective delta opioid receptor agonist

Names
- IUPAC name N,N-Diethyl-4-(5-hydroxyspiro[chromene-2,4'-piperidine]-4-yl)benzamide

Identifiers
| CAS Number | 850305-06-5 |
| 3D model (JSmol) | Interactive image |
| ChEMBL | ChEMBL494480 |
| ChemSpider | 9592841 |
| DrugBank | DB05050 |
| IUPHAR/BPS | 9004 |
| PubChem CID | 11417954 |
| UNII | FA554TW3UP |
- InChI: InChI=1S/C24H28N2O3/c1-3-26(4-2)23(28)18-10-8-17(9-11-18)19-16-24(12-14-25-15-13-24)29-21-7-5-6-20(27)22(19)21/h5-11,16,25,27H,3-4,12-15H2,1-2H3 Key: OPIKUXLJQFYMSC-UHFFFAOYSA-N
- SMILES: CCN(CC)C(=O)C1=CC=C(C=C1)C2=CC3(CCNCC3)OC4=CC=CC(=C42)O

Properties
| Chemical formula | C_{24}H_{28}N_{2}O_{3} |
| Molar mass | 392.499 g·mol^{−1} |

Related compounds
| Related compounds | ADL-5747 |
- Except where otherwise noted, data are given for materials in their standard state (at 25 °C [77 °F], 100 kPa). Infobox references

ADL-5859, also known as compound 20, is an opioid drug that is selective for the δ-opioid receptor, it is being investigated as an alternative to traditional opioids in pain management.

== Mechanism of action ==
Like all opioid drugs, ADL-5859 activates opioid receptors, but where as traditional opioids (such as oxycodone) activate the three main receptors (mu, delta, and kappa), ADL-5859 appears to be selective and only activates the delta receptor. with a K_{i} of 20 nM

== Therapeutic potential ==
Like other opioids, it has potential in pain management; however, by being selective for the delta receptor, multiple undesirable side effects of traditional opioids are not present, such as respiratory depression, sedation, and euphoria.

ADL-5859 was also found to be orally active, which makes it easier to administer.

Multiple tests have shown its efficacy as an analgesic. It also did not seem to be a convulsant, unlike some other delta agonist opioids.
