= Stop the Importation and Trafficking of Synthetic Analogues Act of 2017 =

American federal law

SITSA Act
- Long title: Stop the Importation and Trafficking of Synthetic Analogues (SITSA) Act of 2017
- Announced in: the 115th United States Congress

Legislative history
- Introduced in the United States House on June 8, 2017; Passed the House on June 15, 2018

The Stop the Importation and Trafficking of Synthetic Analogues (SITSA) Act of 2017 (H.R. 2851) is a bill that passed the United States House on June 15, 2018. On June 18, 2018, it was referred to committee in the Senate.
