= Functional selectivity =

Pharmacologic characteristic

Functional selectivity (or agonist trafficking, biased agonism, biased signaling, ligand bias, and differential engagement) is the ligand-dependent selectivity for certain signal transduction pathways relative to a reference ligand (often the endogenous hormone or peptide) at the same receptor. Functional selectivity can be present when a receptor has several possible signal transduction pathways. To which degree each pathway is activated thus depends on which ligand binds to the receptor. Functional selectivity, or biased signaling, is most extensively characterized at G protein coupled receptors (GPCRs). A number of biased agonists, such as those at muscarinic M2 receptors tested as analgesics or antiproliferative drugs, or those at opioid receptors that mediate pain, show potential at various receptor families to increase beneficial properties while reducing side effects. For example, pre-clinical studies with G protein biased agonists at the μ-opioid receptor have shown equivalent efficacy for treating pain with reduced risk for addictive potential and respiratory depression. Studies within the chemokine receptor system also suggest that GPCR biased agonism is physiologically relevant. For example, a beta-arrestin biased agonist of the chemokine receptor CXCR3 induced greater chemotaxis of T cells relative to a G protein biased agonist. Unlike a traditional balanced antagonist, a biased antagonist of the chemokine receptor CXCR4 that blocks G protein signaling while allowing beta-arrestin recruitment and endocytosis was shown to avoid tolerance.

== Functional vs. traditional selectivity ==
Functional selectivity has been proposed to broaden conventional definitions of pharmacology.

Traditional pharmacology posits that a ligand can be either classified as an agonist (full or partial), antagonist or more recently an inverse agonist through a specific receptor subtype, and that this characteristic will be consistent with all effector (second messenger) systems coupled to that receptor. While this dogma has been the backbone of ligand-receptor interactions for decades now, more recent data indicates that this classic definition of ligand-protein associations does not hold true for a number of compounds; such compounds may be termed as mixed agonist-antagonists.

Functional selectivity posits that a ligand may inherently produce a mix of the classic characteristics through a single receptor isoform depending on the effector pathway coupled to that receptor. For instance, a ligand can not easily be classified as an agonist or antagonist, because it can be a little of both, depending on its preferred signal transduction pathways. Thus, such ligands must instead be classified on the basis of their individual effects in the cell, instead of being either an agonist or antagonist to a receptor.

These observations were made in a number of different expression systems, and therefore functional selectivity is not just an epiphenomenon of one particular expression system.

== Examples ==
One notable example of functional selectivity occurs with the 5-HT_{2A} receptor, as well as the 5-HT_{2C} receptor. Serotonin, the main endogenous ligand of 5-HT receptors, is a functionally selective agonist at this receptor, activating phospholipase C (which leads to inositol triphosphate accumulation), but does not activate phospholipase A2, which would result in arachidonic acid signaling. However, the other endogenous compound dimethyltryptamine activates arachidonic acid signaling at the 5-HT_{2A} receptor, as do many exogenous hallucinogens such as DOB and lysergic acid diethylamide (LSD). Notably, LSD does not activate IP_{3} signaling through this receptor to any significant extent. (Conversely, LSD, unlike serotonin, has negligible affinity for the 5-HT_{2C-VGV} isoform, is unable to promote calcium release, and is, thus, functionally selective at 5-HT_{2C}.) Oligomers, specifically 5-HT_{2A}–mGluR2 heteromers, mediate this effect. This may explain why some direct 5-HT_{2} receptor agonists have psychedelic effects, whereas compounds that indirectly increase serotonin signaling at the 5-HT_{2} receptors generally do not, for example: selective serotonin reuptake inhibitors (SSRIs), monoamine oxidase inhibitors (MAOIs), and medications using 5HT_{2A} receptor agonists that do not have constitutive activity at the mGluR2 dimer, such as lisuride.

Tianeptine, an atypical antidepressant, is thought to exhibit functional selectivity at the μ-opioid receptor to mediate its antidepressant effects.

Oliceridine is a μ-opioid receptor agonist that has been described to be functionally selective towards G protein and away from β-arrestin2 pathways. However, recent reports highlight that, rather than functional selectivity or 'G protein bias', this agonist has low intrinsic efficacy. In vivo, it has been reported to mediate pain relief without tolerance nor gastrointestinal side effects.

The delta opioid receptor agonists SNC80 and ARM390 demonstrate functional selectivity that is thought to be due to their differing capacity to cause receptor internalization. While SNC80 causes delta opioid receptors to internalize, ARM390 causes very little receptor internalization. Functionally, that means that the effects of SNC80 (e.g. analgesia) do not occur when a subsequent dose follows the first, whereas the effects of ARM390 persist. However, tolerance to ARM390's analgesia still occurs eventually after multiple doses, though through a mechanism that does not involve receptor internalization. Interestingly, the other effects of ARM390 (e.g. decreased anxiety) persist after tolerance to its analgesic effects has occurred.

An example of functional selectivity to bias metabolism was demonstrated for an electron transfer protein cytochrome P450 reductase (POR) with binding of small-molecule ligands shown to alter the protein conformation and interaction with various redox partner proteins of POR.

== See also ==
- Signal transduction
- Second messenger system
