= 7-Hydroxymitragynine =

Atypical opioid analgesic

- Skeletal structure of 7-hydroxymitragynine

- Ball-and-stick model of 7-hydroxymitragynine

Clinical data
- Other names: 7-OH; 7-OH-MIT; 7α-Hydroxy-7H-mitragynine; 9-Methoxycorynantheidine hydroxyindolenine
- Dependence liability: High
- Addiction liability: High
- Routes of administration: Oral
- Drug class: Opioid
- ATC code: None

Legal status
- Legal status: BR: Class F1 (Prohibited narcotics); US: Unscheduled; SE: Förteckning I

Pharmacokinetic data
- Metabolites: Mitragynine pseudoindoxyl

Identifiers
- IUPAC name: Methyl (2E)-2-[(2S,3S,7aS,12bS)-3-ethyl-7a-hydroxy-8-methoxy-1,2,3,4,6,7,7a,12b-octahydroindolo[2,3-a]quinolizin-2-yl]-3-methoxyprop-2-enoate
- CAS Number: 174418-82-7
- PubChem CID: 44301524
- ChemSpider: 23152144
- UNII: 2T3TWA75R0
- ChEMBL: ChEMBL61630
- CompTox Dashboard (EPA): DTXSID20903988

Chemical and physical data
- Formula: C_{23}H_{30}N_{2}O_{5}
- Molar mass: 414.502 g·mol^{−1}
- 3D model (JSmol): Interactive image; Interactive image
- SMILES: CC[C@@H]1CN2CC[C@@]3(O)C(=Nc4cccc(OC)c34)[C@@H]2C[C@@H]1\C(=C/OC)C(=O)OC; CC[C@@H]1CN2CC[C@@]3(O)C(=NC4=CC=CC(OC)=C34)[C@@H]2C[C@@H]1\C(=C/OC)C(=O)OC
- InChI: InChI=1S/C23H30N2O5/c1-5-14-12-25-10-9-23(27)20-17(7-6-8-19(20)29-3)24-21(23)18(25)11-15(14)16(13-28-2)22(26)30-4/h6-8,13-15,18,27H,5,9-12H2,1-4H3/b16-13+/t14-,15+,18+,23+/m1/s1; Key:RYENLSMHLCNXJT-CYXFISRXSA-N

7-Hydroxymitragynine (7-OH-MIT), also commonly known simply as 7-OH, is a terpenoid indole alkaloid present in Mitragyna speciosa, the plant from which kratom is derived. It was first described in 1994. In humans, it is produced as an active metabolite of mitragynine via hepatic CYP450 enzymes.

7-OH-MIT exhibits greater binding affinity to μ-opioid receptors (MOR) than mitragynine. It acts primarily as a partial agonist at μ-opioid receptors while antagonizing δ- and κ-opioid receptors; unlike traditional opioids, it appears not to recruit the β-arrestin pathway, which may influence side effect profile. In animal studies, the compound has shown strong analgesic potency (reported MOR binding affinity up to ~13 times that of morphine) and produces opioid-like tolerance and withdrawal.

7-OH-MIT occurs only in very small amounts in natural kratom leaves (~2%), so most commercial material is produced semisynthetically through the oxone oxidation of kratom alkaloid extracts. Reports to poison control have risen substantially, and in 2025 the US Food and Drug Administration recommended that the compound be outlawed and moved into Schedule I.

It is being studied as a potential template for developing opioids with improved safety profiles.

== Pharmacology ==
=== Pharmacodynamics ===
Compound	Affinities (K_{i} (nM))			Ref
Compound	MOR	DOR	KOR	Ref
7-Hydroxymitragynine	13.5–41	83–155	96–170	

7-OH-MIT, like mitragynine, appears to be a mixed opioid receptor agonist/antagonist, with recent research indicating that it acts as a partial agonist at μ-opioid receptors and as a competitive antagonist at δ- and κ-opioid receptors. It is generated in the liver through the oxidative metabolism of mitragynine, a process predominantly catalyzed by the cytochrome P450 enzyme CYP3A4, with minor contributions from CYP2C19 and CYP2D6. Both 7-OH-MIT and mitragynine do not appear to activate the β-arrestin pathway, distinguishing it from traditional opiate and opioid chemicals. Cross-tolerance to morphine was evident in mice rendered tolerant to 7-OH-MIT and vice versa. Naloxone-induced withdrawal signs were elicited equally in mice consistently dosed with 7-OH-MIT or morphine.

== Society and culture ==
=== Recreational use ===
Example of a product sold in the U.S. containing chewable tablets of 7-OH-MIT

The alkaloid has been rising in popularity as a recreational drug known as 7-OH, particularly in the United States. 7-OH-MIT containing tablets are sold in an unregulated manner over the counter in gas stations and smoke shops, with little to no information provided to consumers about the risk of addiction or adverse effects.

According to the United States Poison Control Center, the number of cases relating to kratom-based products such as 7-OH-MIT have increased from under 200 in 2014 to 1600 in 2024, with approximately 40% of 7-OH-MIT reports coming from individuals who were abusing the drug.

=== Legal status ===
==== United States ====
In July 2025, the US Food and Drug Administration (FDA) formally recommended that the Drug Enforcement Administration (DEA) classify 7-OH-MIT as a controlled substance. This action was publicized to not be targeting Mitragyna speciosa leaf powder itself. Despite claims by marketers for products that contain 7-OH-MIT that they can be used to treat anxiety and pain, the drug is not approved by the FDA for any medical use or as a food supplement.

== Research ==
A study on 7-OH-MIT's safety was unable to identify a lethal dose orally due to a lack of deaths occurring. In a later part of the same study they found both mitragynine and 7-OH-MIT to be able to cause respiratory depression when given intravenously. This same study also showed seizures in many of the surviving mice from the mitragynine group. 7-OH-MIT has been described as a "prototypical" compound to develop a new generation of opioids with an improved safety profile. In an electrical stimulation test using guinea-pig ileum, 7-OH-MIT showed opioid agonist potency 13-fold higher than morphine.

== See also ==
- Deuterated mitragynine
