= Mitragynine =

Opioid analgesic compound

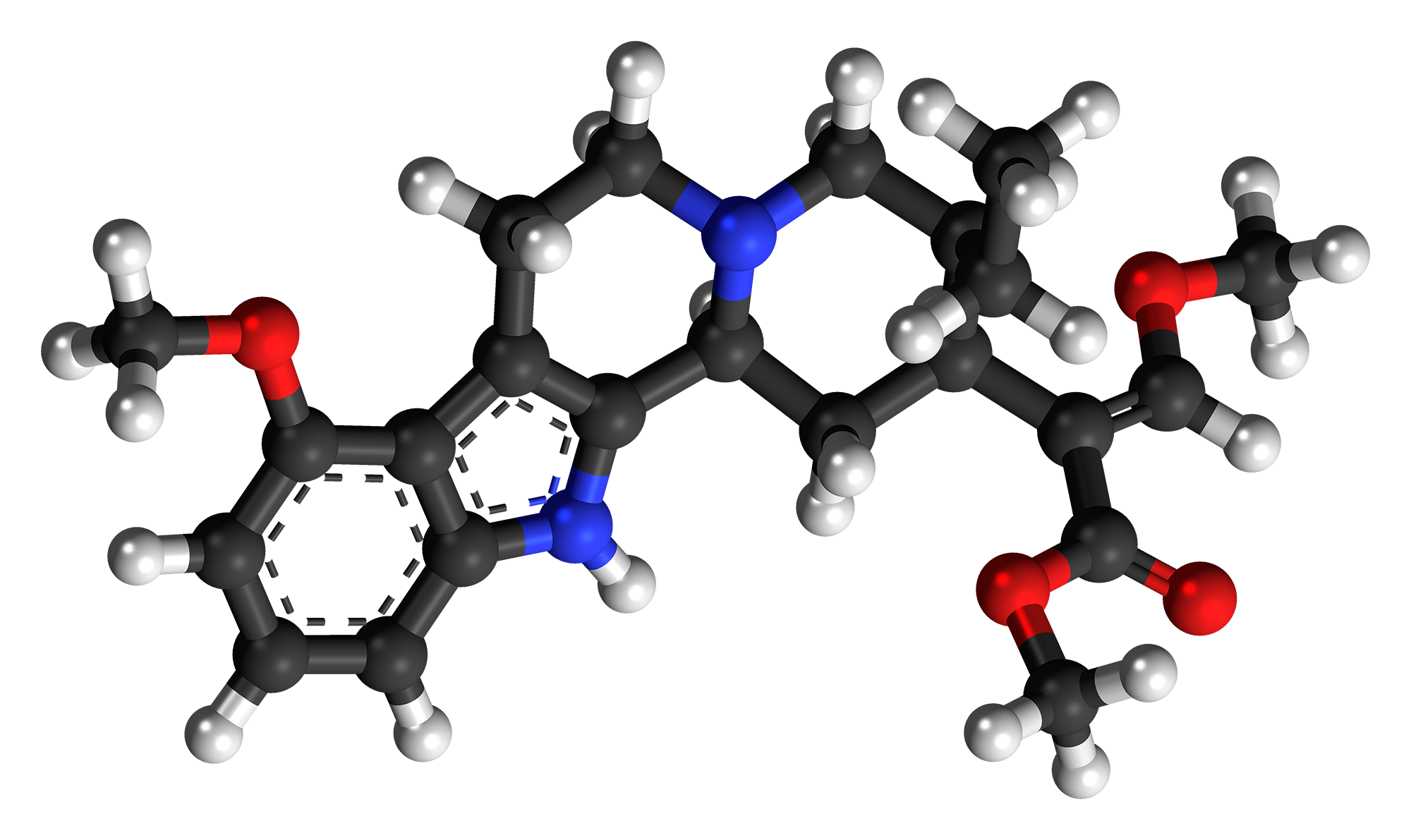

Clinical data
- Other names: (–)-Mitragynine
- Routes of administration: By mouth
- Drug class: Opioid
- ATC code: None

Legal status
- Legal status: AU: S8 (Controlled drug); BR: Class B1 (Psychoactive drugs); CA: Unscheduled; DE: NpSG (Industrial and scientific use only); NZ: Unscheduled; UK: Under Psychoactive Substances Act; US: Unscheduled; UN: Unscheduled; SE: Förteckning I; In general legal for medical and research uses as a research chemical.

Pharmacokinetic data
- Bioavailability: 21%
- Metabolites: 7-Hydroxymitragynine
- Elimination half-life: 7–39 hours

Identifiers
- IUPAC name: methyl (16E)-9,17-dimethoxy-16,17-didehydro-20β-corynan-16-carboxylate
- CAS Number: 4098-40-2
- PubChem CID: 3034396
- ChemSpider: 2298865
- UNII: EP479K822J
- KEGG: C09226
- ChEBI: CHEBI:6956
- ChEMBL: ChEMBL299031
- CompTox Dashboard (EPA): DTXSID701032140

Chemical and physical data
- Formula: C_{23}H_{30}N_{2}O_{4}
- Molar mass: 398.503 g·mol^{−1}
- 3D model (JSmol): Interactive image
- Melting point: 102–106 °C
- SMILES: COC1=CC=CC2=C1C3=C([C@@](C[C@H](/C(C(OC)=O)=C\OC)[C@H](CC)C4)([H])N4CC3)N2
- InChI: InChI=1S/C23H30N2O4/c1-5-14-12-25-10-9-15-21-18(7-6-8-20(21)28-3)24-22(15)19(25)11-16(14)17(13-27-2)23(26)29-4/h6-8,13-14,16,19,24H,5,9-12H2,1-4H3/b17-13+/t14-,16+,19+/m1/s1; Key:LELBFTMXCIIKKX-QVRQZEMUSA-N

Mitragynine is an indole-based alkaloid and is one of the main psychoactive constituents in the Southeast Asian plant Mitragyna speciosa, commonly known as kratom. It has also been researched for its use to potentially manage symptoms of opioid withdrawal. It is a partial agonist of the μ-opioid receptors; and as such can produce effects similar to those of classic opioids such as morphine.

Mitragynine is the most abundant active alkaloid in kratom. In Thai varieties of kratom, mitragynine is the most abundant component (up to 66% of total alkaloids), while 7-hydroxymitragynine (7-OH-MIT) is a minor constituent (up to 2% of total alkaloid content). In Malaysian kratom varieties, mitragynine is present at lower concentration (12% of total alkaloids). Total alkaloid concentration in dried leaves ranges from 0.5–1.5%. Such preparations are orally consumed and typically involve dried kratom leaves which are brewed into tea or ground and placed into capsules.

== Uses ==
=== Medical ===
As of April 2019, the US Food and Drug Administration (FDA) had stated that there were no approved clinical uses for kratom, and that there was no evidence that kratom was safe or effective for treating any condition. This reiterated the conclusion of an earlier report by the European Monitoring Centre for Drugs and Drug Addiction (EMCDDA): As of 2023, mitragynine had not been approved for any medical use. As of 2018, the FDA had noted, in particular, that there had been no clinical trials to study safety and efficacy of kratom in the treatment of opioid addiction.

==== Pain ====
Mitragynine-containing kratom extracts, with their accompanying array of alkaloids and other natural products, have been used for their pain-mitigation properties for at least a century. In Southeast Asia, the consumption of mitragynine from whole leaf kratom preparations is common among laborers who report utilizing kratom's mild stimulant and analgesic properties to increase endurance and ease pain while working. In one laboratory study in a rat model in 2016, alkaloid-containing extracts of kratom gave evidence of inducing naloxone-reversible antinociceptive effects in hotplate and tail-flick tests to a level comparable to oxycodone.

==== Chronic pain ====
Kratom is commonly used in the United States as self-medication for pain. A 2019 review of existing literature suggested the potential of kratom as substitution therapy for chronic pain.

==== Opioid withdrawal ====
As early as the 19th century, kratom was in use for the treatment of opioid addiction and withdrawal. As of 2018, a review of mental health aspects of kratom use mentioned opioid replacement and withdrawal as primary motivations for kratom use: almost 50% of the approximately 8,000 kratom users surveyed indicated kratom use that resulted in reduced or discontinued use of opioids. Some animal models of opioid withdrawal suggest mitragynine can suppress and ameliorate withdrawal from other opioid agonists (e.g., after chronic administration of morphine in zebra fish).

=== Recreational ===
Mitragynine and its metabolite 7-hydroxymitragynine (7-OH-MIT) are thought to underlie the effects of kratom. Consumption of dried kratom leaves yields different responses depending on the dose consumed. At low doses, kratom is reported to induce a mild stimulating effect, while larger doses are reported to produce sedation and analgesia typical of opioids. The concentration of mitragynine and other alkaloids in kratom has been found to vary between particular "strains" of the plant, thus indicating "strain-specific" effects from consumption, as well. Effects of mitragynine-containing preparations from M. speciosa include analgesic, anti-inflammatory, antidepressant, and muscle relaxant properties; adverse effects include a negative impact on cognition; in animal studies the potential for misuse has been found, including through the use of the conditioned place preference (CPP) test, which indicated a distinct reward effect for 7-OH-MIT.

== Adverse effects ==
=== Dependence and withdrawal ===
In one study, symptoms of withdrawal lasted less than three days for most subjects. In an animal study, mitragynine withdrawal symptoms were observed following 14 days of mitragynine intraperitoneal injections in mice and included displays of anxiety, teeth chattering, and piloerection, all of which are characteristic signs of opioid withdrawal in mice and are comparable to morphine withdrawal symptoms in character.

== Chemistry ==
=== Solubility ===
The solubility of mitragynine from kratom in neutral-pH and alkaline water is very low (0.0187 mg/ml at pH 9). The solubility of mitragynine in acidic water is higher (3.5 mg/ml at pH 4), however, this alkaloid can become unstable, so certain products, such as low-pH beverages, have a very short shelf life. Many vendors offer concentrated kratom products with claims of improved mitragynine solubility, however, those products are often formulated with solvents such as propylene glycol, which can make products unpleasant.

== Pharmacology ==
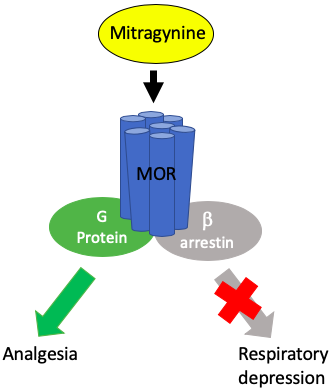
Potential role of mitragynine as a biased agonist of the μ-opioid receptor (MOR), favoring β-arrestin independent signaling

Mitragyna speciosa alkaloids at opioid receptors
Compound	Affinities (K_{i} (nM))			Ratio	Ref
Compound	MOR	DOR	KOR	MOR:DOR:KOR	Ref
Mitragynine	7.24	60.3	1,100	1:8:152	
7-Hydroxymitragynine	13.5	155	123	1:11:9	
Mitragynine pseudoindoxyl	0.087	3.02	79.4	1:35:913	

=== Pharmacodynamics ===
Mitragynine acts on a variety of receptors in the central nervous system (CNS), most notably the μ-, δ-, and κ-opioid receptors. The nature of mitragynine's interaction with opioid receptors has yet to be fully classified, with some reports suggesting partial agonist activity at the μ-opioid receptor and others suggesting full agonist activity. Additionally, mitragynine is known to interact with δ- and κ-opioid receptors as well, but these interactions remain ambiguous, with some reports indicating mitragynine as a delta and κ-opioid receptor competitive antagonist and others as a full agonist of these receptors. In either case, mitragynine is reported to have lower affinity to delta and κ-opioid receptors compared to μ-opioid receptors. Mitragynine is also known to interact with dopamine D_{2}, adenosine, serotonin, and alpha-2 adrenergic receptors, though the significance of these interactions is not fully understood. Additionally, several reports of mitragynine pharmacology indicate potential biased agonism activity favoring G protein signaling pathways independent of β-arrestin recruitment, which was originally thought to be a primary component in reducing opioid-induced respiratory depression. However, recent evidence suggests that low intrinsic efficacy at the μ-opioid receptor is responsible for the improved side effect profile of mitragynine, as opposed to G protein bias.

=== Pharmacokinetics ===
Pharmacokinetics parameters (N=10, human)
t_{1/2} (h)	23.24 ± 16.07
V_{d} (L/kg)	38.04 ± 24.32
t_{max} (h)	0.83 ± 0.35
CL (L/h)	1.4 ± 0.73

Pharmacokinetic analysis has largely taken place in live rodents as well as in rodent and human microsomes. Owing to the heterogeneity of analysis and paucity of human experiments conducted thus far, the pharmacokinetic profile of mitragynine is not complete. However, initial pharmacokinetic studies in humans have yielded preliminary information. In a study of 10 healthy volunteers taking orally administered mitragynine from whole leaf preparations, mitragynine appeared to have a much longer half-life than typical opioid agonists (7–39 hours) and reached peak plasma concentration (T_{max}) within 1 hour of administration. However, another study involving a Kratom tea preparation reported a much shorter half-life of 3 hours. Mitragynine is estimated to have a bioavailability of 21%.

==== Metabolism ====
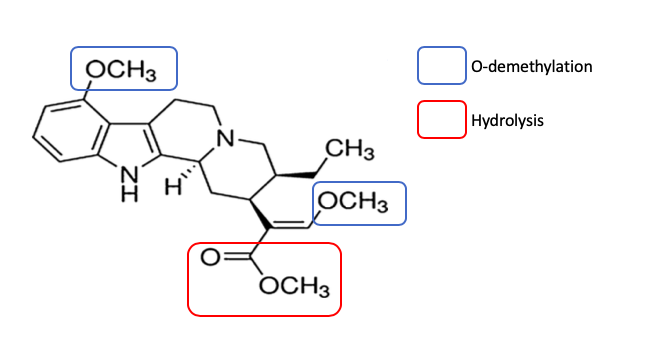
Locations of hydrolysis and o-demethylation of mitragynine during the initial steps of phase I metabolism: CYP / 1A2 / 3A4 / 2D6; IC_{50} (μg/mL) / 39 ^{(6)} / 0.78 ^{(6)} / 3.6 ^{(3)}, 0.636 ^{(6)}; Inhibitory effects of mitragynine on P450 enzymes

Mitragynine is primarily metabolized in the liver, producing many metabolites during both phase I and phase II.

===== Phase I =====
During phase I metabolism, mitragynine undergoes hydrolysis of the methylester group on C16 as well as o-demethylation of both methoxy groups on positions 9 and 17. Following this step, oxidation and reduction reactions convert aldehyde intermediates into alcohols and carboxylic acids. P450 metabolic enzymes are known to facilitate the phase I metabolism of mitragynine which reportedly has an inhibitory effect on multiple P450 enzymes, raising the possibility of adverse drug interactions.

===== Phase II =====
During phase II metabolism, phase I metabolites undergo glucuronidation and sulfation to form multiple glucuronide and sulfate conjugates, which are then excreted via urine.

== History ==
Mitragynine consumption for medicinal and recreational purposes dates back centuries, although early use was primarily limited to Southeast Asian countries such as Indonesia and Thailand, where the plant grows indigenously. Recently, mitragynine use has spread throughout Europe and the Americas as both a recreational and medicinal drug. While research into the effects of kratom have begun to emerge, investigations on the active compound mitragynine are less common.

== Society and culture ==
=== Legal status in the United States ===
In the United States, kratom and its active ingredients are not scheduled under DEA guidelines. Despite the current legal status of the plant and its constituents, the legality of kratom has been turbulent in recent years. In August 2016, the DEA issued a report of intent stating that mitragynine and 7-hydroxymitragynine would undergo emergency scheduling and be placed under Schedule I classification until further notice, making kratom strictly illegal and thus hindering research on its active constituents. Following this report, the DEA faced significant public and administrative opposition in the form of a White House petition signed by 140,000 citizens and a letter to the DEA administrator backed by 51 members of the House of Representatives resisting the proposed scheduling. This opposition led the DEA to withdraw its report of intent in October 2016, allowing for unencumbered research into the potential benefits and health risks associated with mitragynine and other alkaloids in the kratom plant. Kratom and its active constituents are unscheduled and legally sold in stores and online in the United States except for a small number of states. As of June 2019, the FDA continues to warn consumers not to use kratom, while advocating for more research for a better understanding of kratom's safety profile.

Legal status by state

Mitragynine is currently prohibited in Alabama, Arkansas, Connecticut, Indiana, Kansas, Louisiana, Massachusetts, Tennessee, Vermont and Wisconsin. Other states have usage prohibitions, such as California which prevents it from being sold as a consumable product.

== Research ==
=== Research limitations ===
Inconsistencies in dosing, purity, and concomitant drug use makes evaluating the effects of mitragynine in humans difficult. Conversely, animal studies control for such variability, but offer limited translatable information relevant to humans. Experimental limitations aside, mitragynine has been found to interact with a variety of receptors, although the nature and extent of receptor interactions has yet to be fully characterized. Additionally, the toxicity of mitragynine and associated kratom alkaloids has yet to be fully determined in humans, nor has the risk of overdose. More studies are necessary to assess safety and potential therapeutic utility.

=== Toxicology ===
Mitragynine toxicity in humans is largely unknown, as animal studies show significant species-specific differences in mitragynine tolerance. Mitragynine toxicity in humans is rarely reported although specific examples of seizures and liver toxicity in kratom consumers have been reported. Due to cytochrome P450 enzyme inhibition, the combination of mitragynine with other drugs poses concern for adverse reactions to mitragynine. Fatalities involving mitragynine tend to include its use in combination with opioids and some cough suppressants. Post-mortem toxicology screens indicate a wide range of mitragynine blood concentrations ranging from 10 μg/L to 4800 μg/L, making it difficult to calculate what constitutes a toxic dose in humans. These variations are suggested to result from differences in the toxicology assays used, and how long after death the assays were conducted.

== See also ==
- Mitragynine pseudoindoxyl
- Deuterated mitragynine
