= SNC-80 =

Opioid analgesic drug

Clinical data
- Other names: SNC-80

Identifiers
- IUPAC name: 4-[(R)-[(2S,5R)-4-allyl-2,5-dimethylpiperazin-1-yl](3-methoxyphenyl)methyl]-N,N-diethylbenzamide
- CAS Number: 156727-74-1
- PubChem CID: 123924
- IUPHAR/BPS: 1611
- ChemSpider: 110453
- UNII: L842QB22SW
- ChEBI: CHEBI:231727
- ChEMBL: ChEMBL13470
- CompTox Dashboard (EPA): DTXSID6045662

Chemical and physical data
- Formula: C_{28}H_{39}N_{3}O_{2}
- Molar mass: 449.639 g·mol^{−1}
- 3D model (JSmol): Interactive image
- SMILES: O=C(N(CC)CC)c1ccc(cc1)[C@@H](N2C[C@H](N(C\C=C)C[C@@H]2C)C)c3cccc(OC)c3
- InChI: InChI=1S/C28H39N3O2/c1-7-17-30-19-22(5)31(20-21(30)4)27(25-11-10-12-26(18-25)33-6)23-13-15-24(16-14-23)28(32)29(8-2)9-3/h7,10-16,18,21-22,27H,1,8-9,17,19-20H2,2-6H3/t21-,22+,27-/m1/s1; Key:KQWVAUSXZDRQPZ-UMTXDNHDSA-N

SNC-80 is an opioid analgesic compound that selectively activates μ–δ opioid receptor heteromers and is used primarily in scientific research. Discovered in 1994, SNC-80 was a pioneering non-peptide compound regarded as a highly selective agonist for the δ-opioid receptor.

SNC-80 was the first non-peptide compound developed that was regarded as a highly selective agonist for the δ-opioid receptor. It has been shown to produce useful analgesic, antidepressant and anxiolytic effects in animal studies, but its usefulness is limited by producing convulsions at high doses, and so SNC-80 is not used medically, although it is a useful compound in scientific research.
