= Δ-opioid receptor =

Opioid receptor

OPRD1
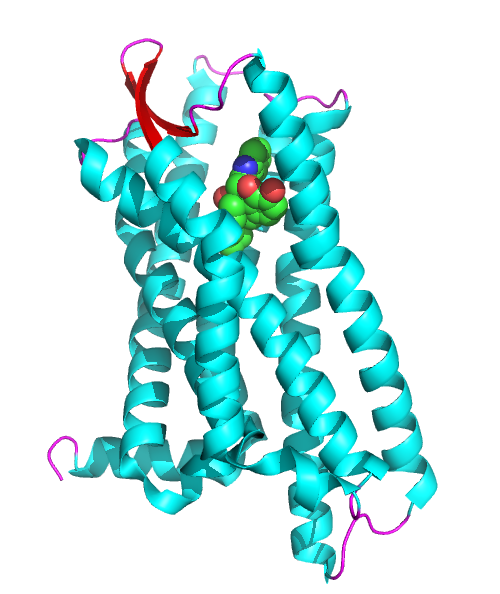

Identifiers
- Aliases: OPRD1, OPRD, Δ-opioid receptor, opioid receptor delta 1, DOP, DOR1, DOR
- External IDs: OMIM: 165195; MGI: 97438; GeneCards: OPRD1
Available structures
PDB	Ortholog search: PDBe RCSB
PDB	List of PDB id codes 4N6H, 4RWA, 4RWD

Gene location (Human)
Chr.	Chromosome 1 (human)
Band	1p35.3	Start	28,812,170 bp
Band	1p35.3	End	28,871,267 bp

Gene location (Mouse)
Chr.	Chromosome 4 (mouse)
Band	4 D2.3|4 64.78 cM	Start	131,838,037 bp
Band	4 D2.3|4 64.78 cM	End	131,871,797 bp
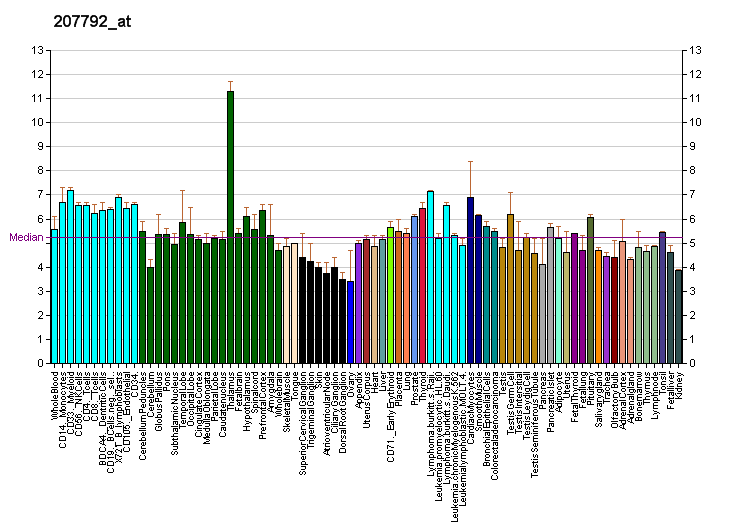
RNA expression pattern
Bgee	Human / Mouse (ortholog); Top expressed in: endothelial cell; islet of Langerhans; primary visual cortex; prefrontal cortex; right frontal lobe; middle temporal gyrus; superior frontal gyrus; Brodmann area 23; dorsolateral prefrontal cortex; Brodmann area 9 / Top expressed in: trophoblast giant cell; pituitary stalk; primary oocyte; secondary oocyte; zygote; superior frontal gyrus; outer nuclear layer; primary visual cortex; primary trophoblast giant cell; dentate gyrus of hippocampal formation granule cell; More reference expression data
BioGPS	More reference expression data
Gene ontology
Molecular function	G protein-coupled enkephalin receptor activity; G protein-coupled receptor activity; neuropeptide binding; signal transducer activity; G protein-coupled opioid receptor activity; protein binding; receptor serine/threonine kinase binding; peptide binding
Cellular component	cytoplasm; axon terminus; integral component of membrane; vesicle; postsynaptic membrane; membrane; intrinsic component of plasma membrane; plasma membrane; integral component of plasma membrane; dendrite membrane; membrane raft; neuron projection; integral component of synaptic vesicle membrane; spine apparatus; neuronal dense core vesicle; integral component of presynaptic membrane; integral component of postsynaptic density membrane
Biological process	regulation of calcium ion transport; adenylate cyclase-inhibiting G protein-coupled receptor signaling pathway; regulation of sensory perception of pain; eating behavior; adult locomotory behavior; negative regulation of protein oligomerization; cellular response to growth factor stimulus; G protein-coupled receptor signaling pathway, coupled to cyclic nucleotide second messenger; cellular response to toxic substance; negative regulation of gene expression; positive regulation of peptidyl-serine phosphorylation; regulation of mitochondrial membrane potential; phospholipase C-activating G protein-coupled receptor signaling pathway; positive regulation of CREB transcription factor activity; G protein-coupled opioid receptor signaling pathway; immune response; neuropeptide signaling pathway; cellular response to hypoxia; signal transduction; chemical synaptic transmission; sensory perception of pain; G protein-coupled receptor signaling pathway; cytokine-mediated signaling pathway
Sources:Amigo / QuickGO
Orthologs
Databases	NCBI: entry; OMA: entry
Species	Human	Mouse
Entrez	4985	18386
Ensembl	ENSG00000116329	ENSMUSG00000050511
UniProt	P41143	P32300
RefSeq (mRNA)	NM_000911	NM_013622
RefSeq (protein)	NP_000902	NP_038650
Location (UCSC)	Chr 1: 28.81 – 28.87 Mb	Chr 4: 131.84 – 131.87 Mb
PubMed search
- Wikidata
View/Edit Human	View/Edit Mouse

The δ-opioid receptor, also known as delta opioid receptor or simply delta receptor, abbreviated DOR or DOP, is an inhibitory 7-transmembrane G-protein coupled receptor coupled to the G protein G_{i}/G_{0} and has enkephalins as its endogenous ligands. The regions of the brain where the δ-opioid receptor is largely expressed vary from species model to species model. In humans, the δ-opioid receptor is most heavily expressed in the basal ganglia and neocortical regions of the brain.

== Function ==
The endogenous system of opioid receptors is well known for its analgesic potential; however, the exact role of δ-opioid receptor activation in pain modulation is largely up for debate. This also depends on the model at hand since receptor activity is known to change from species to species. Activation of delta receptors produces analgesia, perhaps as significant potentiators of μ-opioid receptor agonists. However, it seems like delta agonism provides heavy potentiation to any mu agonism. Therefore, even selective mu agonists can cause analgesia under the right conditions, whereas under others can cause none whatsoever. It is also suggested however that the pain modulated by the μ-opioid receptor and that modulated by the δ-opioid receptor are distinct types, with the assertion that DOR modulates the nociception of chronic pain, while MOR modulates acute pain.

Evidence for whether delta agonists produce respiratory depression is mixed; high doses of the delta agonist peptide DPDPE produced respiratory depression in sheep. In contrast both the peptide delta agonist Deltorphin II and the non-peptide delta agonist (+)-BW373U86 actually stimulated respiratory function and blocked the respiratory depressant effect of the potent μ-opioid agonist alfentanil, without affecting pain relief. It thus seems likely that while δ-opioid agonists can produce respiratory depression at very high doses, at lower doses they have the opposite effect, a fact that may make mixed mu/delta agonists such as DPI-3290 potentially very useful drugs that might be much safer than the μ agonists currently used for pain relief. Many delta agonists may also cause seizures at high doses, although not all delta agonists produce this effect.

Of additional interest is the potential for delta agonists to be developed for use as a novel class of antidepressant drugs, following robust evidence of both antidepressant effects and also upregulation of BDNF production in the brain in animal models of depression. These antidepressant effects have been linked to endogenous opioid peptides acting at δ- and μ-opioid receptors, and so can also be produced by enkephalinase inhibitors such as RB-101. However, in human models the data for antidepressant effects remains inconclusive. In the 2008 Phase 2 clinical trial by Astra Zeneca, NCT00759395, 15 patients were treated with the selective delta agonist AZD 2327. The results showed no significant effect on mood suggesting that δ-opioid receptor modulation might not participate in the regulation of mood in humans. However, doses were administered at low doses and the pharmacological data also remains inconclusive. Further trials are required.

Another interesting aspect of δ-opioid receptor function is the suggestion of μ/δ-opioid receptor interactions. At the extremes of this suggestion lies the possibility of a μ/δ opioid receptor oligomer. The evidence for this stems from the different binding profiles of typical mu and delta agonists such as morphine and DAMGO respectively, in cells that coexpress both receptors compared to those in cells that express them individually. In addition, work by Fan and coworkers shows the restoration of the binding profiles when distal carboxyl termini are truncated at either receptor, suggesting that the termini play a role in the oligomerization. While this is exciting, rebuttal by the Javitch and coworkers suggest the idea of oligomerization may be overplayed. Relying on RET, Javitch and coworkers showed that RET signals were more characteristic of random proximity between receptors, rather than an actual bond formation between receptors, suggesting that discrepancies in binding profiles may be the result of downstream interactions, rather than novel effects due to oligomerization. Nevertheless, coexpression of receptors remains unique and potentially useful in the treatment of mood disorders and pain.

Recent work indicates that exogenous ligands that activate the delta receptors mimic the phenomenon known as ischemic preconditioning. Experimentally, if short periods of transient ischemia are induced the downstream tissues are robustly protected if longer-duration interruption of the blood supply is then effected. Opiates and opioids with DOR activity mimic this effect. In the rat model, introduction of DOR ligands results in significant cardioprotection.

== Ligands ==
Until comparatively recently, there were few pharmacological tools for the study of δ receptors. As a consequence, our understanding of their function is much more limited than those of the other opioid receptors for which selective ligands have long been available.

However, there are now several selective δ-opioid receptor agonists available, including peptides such as DPDPE and deltorphin II, and non-peptide drugs such as SNC-80, the more potent (+)-BW373U86, a newer drug DPI-287, which does not produce the problems with convulsions seen with the earlier agents, and the mixed μ/δ agonist DPI-3290, which is a much more potent analgesic than the more highly selective δ agonists. Selective antagonists for the δ receptor are also available, with the best known being the opiate derivative naltrindole.

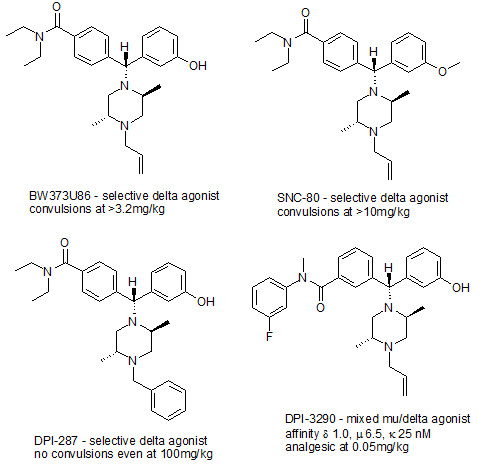

=== Agonists ===
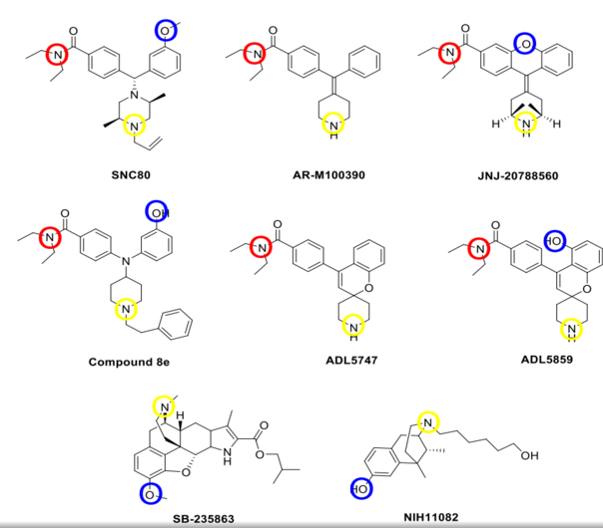
A showing of selective delta opioid ligands. Blue represents a common phenolic moiety, yellow a basic nitrogen, and red a diethyl amide moiety which is not set in stone, but rather a bulky region that fits into a hydrophobic pocket.

Peptides

- Leu-enkephalin
- Met-enkephalin
- Deltorphins
- DADLE
- DPDPE

Non-peptides

- ADL-5859
- BU-48
- BW373U86
- DPI-221
- DPI-287
- DPI-3290
- RWJ-394674-
- SNC-80
- TAN-67
- Amoxapine (partial agonist)
- Cannabidiol (allosteric modulator, non-selective)
- Desmethylclozapine
- Mitragynine
- Mitragynine pseudoindoxyl
- Norbuprenorphine (peripherally restricted)
- N-Phenethyl-14-ethoxymetopon
- 7-Spiroindanyloxymorphone
- Tetrahydrocannabinol (allosteric modulator, non-selective)
- TRV250 (biased agonist)
- Xorphanol

=== Antagonists ===
- Buprenorphine
- Naltriben
- Naltrindole
- Mitragynine
- 7-Hydroxymitragynine

== Interactions ==
δ-opioid receptors have been shown to interact with β_{2} adrenergic receptors, arrestin β_{1} and GPRASP1.

== See also ==
- κ-opioid receptor
- μ-opioid receptor
