= Equianalgesic =

Comparison of equivalent doses of pain medications

An equianalgesic chart is a conversion chart that lists equivalent doses of analgesics (drugs used to relieve pain). Equianalgesic charts are used for calculation of an equivalent dose (a dose which would offer an equal amount of analgesia) between different analgesics. Tables of this general type are also available for NSAIDs, benzodiazepines, depressants, stimulants, anticholinergics and others.

When using oral morphine as a baseline, the comparison of strengths of opioid analgesics is referred to as oral morphine equivalent.

== Format ==
Equianalgesic tables are available in different formats, such as pocket-sized cards for ease of reference. A frequently-seen format has the drug names in the left column, the route of administration in the center columns and any notes in the right column.

== Purpose ==
There are several reasons for switching a patient to a different pain medication. These include practical considerations such as lower cost or unavailability of a drug at the patient's preferred pharmacy, or medical reasons such as lack of effectiveness of the current drug or to minimize adverse effects. Some patients request to be switched to a different narcotic due to stigma associated with a particular drug (e.g. a patient refusing methadone due to its association with opioid addiction treatment). Equianalgesic charts are also used when calculating an equivalent dosage of the same drug, but with a different route of administration.

== Precautions ==
An equianalgesic chart can be a useful tool, but the user must take care to correct for all relevant variables such as route of administration, cross tolerance, half-life and the bioavailability of a drug. For example, the narcotic levorphanol is 4–8 times stronger than morphine, but also has a much longer half-life. Simply switching the patient from 40 mg of morphine to 10 mg of levorphanol would be dangerous due to dose accumulation, and hence frequency of administration should also be taken into account.

There are other concerns about equianalgesic charts. Many charts derive their data from studies conducted on opioid-naive patients. Patients with chronic (rather than acute) pain may respond to analgesia differently. Repeated administration of a medication is also different from single dosing, as many drugs have active metabolites that can build up in the body. Patient variables such as sex, age, and organ function may also influence the effect of the drug on the system. These variables are rarely included in equianalgesic charts.

== Opioid equivalency table ==
Opioids are a class of compounds that elicit analgesic (pain killing) effects in humans and animals by binding to the μ-opioid receptor within the central nervous system. The following table lists opioid and non-opioid analgesic drugs and their relative potencies. Values for the potencies represent opioids taken orally unless another route of administration is provided. As such, their bioavailabilities differ, and they may be more potent when taken intravenously.

=== Nonlinearities ===
This chart measures pain relief versus mass of medication. Not all medications have a fixed relationship on this scale. Methadone is different from most opioids because its potency can vary depending on how long it is taken; acute use (1–3 days) yields a potency about 1.5× stronger than that of morphine and chronic use (7 days+) yields a potency about 2.5 to 5× that of morphine. This is called a dose-dependent potency curve and makes methadone somewhat unique among opioids, thought to be caused by the NMDA receptor activity of the drug then altering the behaviour of the opioid receptors that other opioids might target. Similarly, the effect of tramadol increases after consecutive dosing due to the accumulation of its active metabolite and an increase of the oral bioavailability in chronic use.

Comparison to oral morphine (Note: Approximate. There is a wide range of values in controlled trials.)
Analgesic	Strength (relative)	Equivalent dose (10 mg oral morphine) (Note: 10 mg oral morphine is equivalent to n mg analgesic drug x, e.g. 10 mg morphine is equivalent to 3600 mg paracetamol or 1.5 mg hydromorphone)	Bioavailability	Half-life of active metabolites (hours)	Oral-to-parenteral ratio	Speed of onset	Duration
Paracetamol (non-opioid)	1/360	3600 mg	63–89%	1–4		37 min (PO); 8 min (IV)	5–6 hours
Aspirin (NSAID, non-opioid)	1/360	3600 mg	80–100%	3.1–9			
Ibuprofen (NSAID, non-opioid)	1/222	2220 mg	87–100%	1.3–3			
Diflunisal (NSAID, non-opioid)	1/160	1600 mg	80–90%	8–12			
Naproxen (NSAID, non-opioid)	1/138	1380 mg	95%	12–24			
Indomethacin (NSAID non-opioid)	1/64						
Diclofenac (NSAID, non-opioid)	1/10	100 mg (est.)	50–60%	1–4			
Ketorolac (NSAID, non-opioid)	1/3	30 mg IM (est.)	80–100%	5–7			
Nefopam (Centrally-acting non-opioid)	5/8	16 mg IM (est.)		Nefopam: 3–8, Desmethylnefopam 10–15			
Piroxicam (NSAID non-opioid)	3	6.66 mg				2–4 hours	40 hours
Dextropropoxyphene	1/20	130–200 mg					
Codeine	1/10	100–120 mg (PO)	~90%	2.5–3 (C6G 1.94; morphine 2–3)		15–30 minutes (PO)	4–6 hours
Tramadol	1/10	~100 mg	75% (IR), 85–90% (ER)	6.0–8.8 (M1)			
Opium (oral)	1/10	~100 mg	~25% (morphine)	2.5–3.0 (morphine, codeine)			
Tilidine	1/10	100 mg	6% (parent drug), 99% (active metabolite)	nortilidine 3.3 (PO) & 4.9 IV, bisnortilidine 5 (PO) & 6.9 (IV)	2.2:1	10–15 minutes (oral); 25–50 minutes (peak analgesic effect)	3–4 hours
Dihydrocodeine	1/10	100 mg	20%	4			
Anileridine	1/4	40 mg					
Alphaprodine	1/5	40–60 mg					
Tapentadol	3/10	32 mg	32% (fasting)				
Pethidine (meperidine)	1/3	30 mg SC/IV/IM 300 mg (PO)	50–60% Orally, 100% SC/IV/IM	3–5		5–15 sec if IV, 15–25 min if orally	
Dipipanone	2/5	25 mg (PO)		3.2–3.8 hours			±4 hours
Benzylfentanyl	1/2						
AH-7921	4/5						
SR-17018	4/5	10–12 mg	100% IV (presumably) Unknown (research is still being conducted)			5–10 seconds if used IV and 15–25 min orally (PO)	
Nalbuphine	9/10	10–11 mg	~33% (PO), 76% (SC), 81% (IM)	3–6		3 minutes, 10 minutes (peak effect)	3–6 hours
Hydrocodone	1	10 mg	70%	3.8–6 (Instant Release; PO)		10–30 min (Instant Release; PO)	4–6
Pentazocine lactate (IV)	1	10 mg SC/IV/IM, 150 mg (PO)					
Morphine (oral)	1	10 mg	~25%	2–4	3:1	30 min (PO)	3–6 hours
Oxycodone (oral)	1.5	6.67 mg	(60–87 / ±75% PO) / 78.2% (IN) / 100% (IV/IM) or other parenteral administrations apart from spinal administration	2–3 hours (Instant Release)(PO); 4.5 hours (Controlled Release)(PO)		10–30 min (Instant Release)(PO); 1 hour (Controlled Release)(PO)	3–6 hours (Instant Release)(PO); 10–12 hours (Controlled Release)(PO)
Spiradoline	1.5–7.0						
Nicomorphine	2–3	3.33–5 mg	20%	4			
Butorphanol	2.3	4.3 mg	~12% (PO), 25–35% (SL), 70% (NAS)	3 (IM/IV) 4.5–5.5 (NAS)	5.8:1	15 minutes	3–4 hours
Metopon	3	3.5 mg					
Oxycodone (IV/IM) or other parenteral administrations apart from spinal administration	3–4	2.5–3.33 mg	(60–87 / ±75% PO) / 78.2% (IN) / 100% (IV/IM) or other parenteral administrations apart from spinal administration	1.5–3 (IV/IM)		5 min (IV)	2–4 hours
Morphine (IV/IM) or other parenteral administrations apart from spinal administration	3–4	2.5–3.33 mg	100%	3–4	3:1/4:1	Instantaneously (from 5 to 15 sec; IV); 5–15 min (IM)	3–7 hours
Clonitazene	2–3	3.33 mg					
Methadone (acute)	3–4	2.5–3.33 mg	40–90%	15–60	2:1		
Methadone (chronic)	2.5–5	2–4 mg	40–90%	15–60	2:1		
Phenazocine	3.2–4.3	~2.5 mg				15 min (IV); 30 minutes (IM); 30–60 minutes (oral)	3–5 hours
Diamorphine (Heroin; IV/IM) or other parenteral administrations apart from spinal administration	4–5 (IV, IM) 2–2.5 (insufflated)	2–2.5 mg	100%	<0.6 (morphine prodrug)		Instantaneously (from 5 to 15 sec; IV); 2 to 5 min (IM)	3 to 7 hours (morphine prodrug)
6-MAM	6–7 (IV, IM)	1.25–1.6	100% (IV, IM)	<0.6 (morphine prodrug)	presumably 2:1	Instantaneously (from 5 to 15 sec; IV); 2 to 5 min (IM)	3 to 7 hours (morphine prodrug)
Dezocine	7.7–13	0.76–1.29 mg	97% (IM)	2.2	4–6 hours	5 min (IV); 5–15 min (IM/BUC); 6–8 hours (TD)	
Hydromorphone	10 (SC, IV, IM); 3–3.75 (PO)	0.5–0.75 mg (SC, IV, IM); 2.5 mg (PO)	Orally: 30–35%, Intranasal: 52–58%, IV/IM: 100% 62%	2–3	5:1		
Oxymorphone	10 (SC, IV, IM); 3–4(PO)	3.33 mg (PO), 0.333 mg (IV, IM & Interlaminar)	PO: 10% Buccal: 28% Sublingual: 37.5% Intranasal: 43% IV, IM & IT: 100%	7.25–9.43		35 min (PO), Instantaneously (from 5 to 15 sec)(IV)	6–8 hours orally 2–6 hours parenteral
U-47700	7.5	1.5 mg		1.5–3			
Levorphanol	8	1.25 mg	70%	11–16	1:1		
Desomorphine	8–10	1–1.25 mg	~100% (IV)	2–3		Instantaneously (from 5 to 15 sec)(IV); 2–5 min (IM)	3–4 hours
N-Phenethylnormorphine	8–14						
Alfentanil	10–25	0.1–0.4 mg		1.5 (90–111 minutes)		Instantaneously (from 5 to 15 sec); 4× more rapid than fentanyl	0.25 hr (15 min); up to 54 minutes until offset of effects
Trefentanil	10						
Brifentanil	10–25						
Acetylfentanyl	15						
7-Hydroxymitragynine	17	~0.6 mg					
Butyrfentanyl	25						
Enadoline	25	15 μg (threshold) and 0.160 mg/kg (dissociative effects)					
Buprenorphine (SL)	40–80	0.25 mg	30% (SL); ~100% (TD); 65% (BUC); 48% (INS)	20–70, mean 37	3:1	45 min	12–24 hours
N-Phenethyl-14-ethoxymetopon	60	160 μg					
Furanylfentanyl	50–100						
Phenomorphan	60–80	0.13–0.16 mg					
N-Phenethylnordesomorphine	85						
Phenaridine	50–100						
Fentanyl	50–100	0.1 mg (100 μg) IM/IV	33% (SL); 92% (TD); 89% (INS); 50% (BUC)	0.04 (IV); 7 (TD)		5 min (TD/IV)	30–60 minutes (IV)
Metonitazene	100	0.1 mg/100 μg					
Acrylfentanyl	50–100+						
Remifentanil	100	100 μg	100% (IM/IV)	0.05 (3–6 min context-sensitive half-life; 7–18 min elimination half-life)		Instantaneously (from 5 to 15 sec)	15 minutes; rapid offset of effects necessitates continuous infusion for maintenance of anesthesia
Parafluorofentanyl (2-Fluorofentanyl)	111						
Buprenorphine (Transdermal)	100–115	0.1 mg (100 μg)	30% (SL); ~100% (TD); 65% (BUC); 48% (INS)		3:1	45–60 minutes	12–24 hours
14-Cinnamoyloxycodeinone	177 (median potency);g 101–310 (varied potencies among test subjects)	77 μg	2.8% (PO); 5.8% (SC)		250:7		
Protonitazepyne	190–200	55–60 μg					
Protonitazene	200	50 μg					
Ocfentanil	200	40–80 μg					
Ro4-1539	240–480	20–40 μg					
14-Methoxymetopon	500 (IV)	20 μg					
Isotonitazene	500	20 μg					
Sufentanil	500–1,000	10–20 μg	9% (PO); 52–59% (SL); 78% (BUC); 100% (IM/IV)	4.4	2:1	1–3 min (IV); 5 min (IN); 10 min (EPD); 6–15 min (SL)	30 min (IV); 40–50 min (SL)
BDPC	504	~20 μg					
Orthofluorofentanyl	564	~17 μg					
C-8813	591	~15 μg					
4-Phenylfentanyl	800						
Etonitazene	1,000–1,500	6.6–10 μg					
3-Methylfentanyl	1,000 (3-methylfentanyl, (trans)-(+-)-isomer; 6,600 (3-methylfentanyl, (cis)-(-)-isomer)						
N-Desetylisotonitazene	2,000	5–10 μg					
Etonitazepyne	2,000	5 μg					
Etorphine	500–2,000	3.3–10 μg					
Ohmefentanyl	6,300						
Acetorphine	8,700	1.33 μg					
Dihydroetorphine	12,000	0.83–10 μg (20–40 μg SL)					
Carfentanil	10,000	1.0 μg		7.7			
Lofentanil	10,000–11,000						
4-Carboethoxyohmefentanil	30,000						
Ohmecarfentanil	30,000						
R-30490	10,000–100,000						
14-Methoxymetopon	1,000,000 (intrathecal & supraspinal)	0.1 μg					
PO: oral • BUC: buccal • SL: sublingual • TD: transdermal • IV: intravenous injection • IM: intramuscular injection • SC: subcutaneous injection • EPD: epidural injection "Strength" is defined as analgesic potency relative to oral morphine. Tolerance, sensitization, cross-tolerance, metabolism, and hyperalgesia may be complex factors in some individuals. Interactions with other drugs, food and drink, and other factors may increase or decrease the effect of certain analgesics and alter their half-life. Because some listed analgesics are prodrugs or have active metabolites, individual variation in liver enzymes (e.g., CYP2D6 enzyme) may result in significantly altered effects.

== See also ==
- Oripavine – for more on the comparative strength of oripavine derivatives
