= N-Phenethylnordesomorphine =

Chemical compound

Identifiers
- IUPAC name: 3-hydroxy-4,5α-epoxy-17-(2-phenylethyl)morphinan
- CAS Number: 722450-07-9
- PubChem CID: 60208601
- ChemSpider: 26231038
- CompTox Dashboard (EPA): DTXSID401029746

Chemical and physical data
- Formula: C_{24}H_{27}NO_{2}
- Molar mass: 361.485 g·mol^{−1}
- 3D model (JSmol): Interactive image
- SMILES: [H][C@@]12[C@]3(CCN4CCC5=CC=CC=C5)C6=C(O2)C(O)=CC=C6C[C@@H]4[C@]3([H])CCC1
- InChI: InChI=1S/C24H27NO2/c26-20-10-9-17-15-19-18-7-4-8-21-24(18,22(17)23(20)27-21)12-14-25(19)13-11-16-5-2-1-3-6-16/h1-3,5-6,9-10,18-19,21,26H,4,7-8,11-15H2/t18-,19+,21-,24+/m0/s1; Key:JZVQXSYNZPVRTQ-FPRSRYDQSA-N

N-Phenethylnordesomorphine is an opiate analgesic drug derived from desomorphine by replacing the N-methyl group with β-phenethyl. Since desomorphine is already around eight times more potent than morphine, the additional boost in binding affinity produced by using the larger phenethyl group makes N-phenethylnordesomorphine a highly potent analgesic drug, some 85 times more potent than morphine, and a similar strength to the closely related morphinan derivative phenomorphan.

== See also ==
- 14-Cinnamoyloxycodeinone
- 14-Phenylpropoxymetopon
- 7-PET
- N-Phenethyl-14-ethoxymetopon
- N-Phenethylnormorphine
- N-Phenethylnoroxymorphone
- RAM-378
- Ro4-1539
