= C18H21NO4 =

The molecular formula C_{18}H_{21}NO_{4} (molar mass: 315.36 g/mol) may refer to:

- Codeine-N-oxide
- Homolycorine
- 14-Methoxydihydromorphinone
- 14-Hydroxycodeine
- Oxycodone
- 2C2-NBOMe
