= C25H32N2O3 =

The molecular formula C_{25}H_{32}N_{2}O_{3} (molar mass : 408.542 g/mol) may refer to:

- CYM51010
- Lofentanil
