= C27H31NO4 =

The molecular formula C_{27}H_{31}NO_{4} (molar mass: 433.54 g/mol) may refer to:

- Estrapronicate, a synthetic estrogen
- N-Phenethyl-14-ethoxymetopon, a potent analgesic
- 14-Phenylpropoxymetopon, a potent analgesic
