= C24H25NO4 =

The molecular formula C_{24}H_{25}NO_{4} may refer to:

- Benzgalantamine
- Flavoxate
- N-Phenethylnoroxymorphone
