= Ohmecarfentanil =

Chemical compound

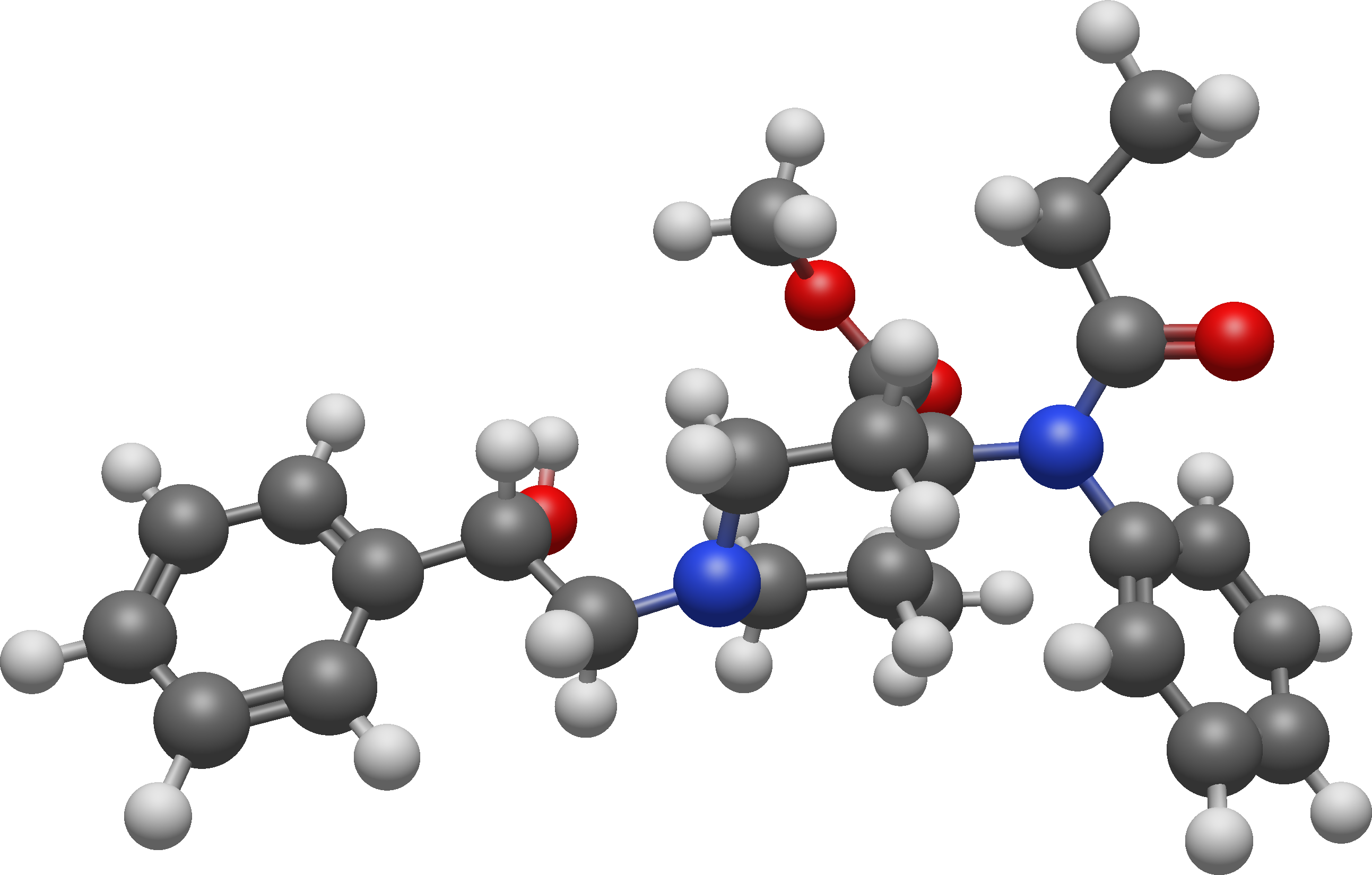

Legal status
- Legal status: CA: Schedule I; DE: NpSG (Industrial and scientific use only); UK: Class A

Identifiers
- IUPAC name: Methyl 1-(2-hydroxy-2-phenylethyl)-3-methyl-4-(N-propanoylanilino)piperidine-4-carboxylate
- CAS Number: 3R,4R: 791564-68-6
- PubChem CID: 3R,4R: 10432482; 3R,4S: 10071012
- ChemSpider: 3R,4R: 8607909; 3R,4S: 8246552
- UNII: 3R,4R: PZ5RGN8MR8

Chemical and physical data
- Formula: C_{25}H_{32}N_{2}O_{4}
- Molar mass: 424.541 g·mol^{−1}
- 3D model (JSmol): 3R,4R: Interactive image; 3R,4S: Interactive image
- SMILES: 3R,4R: CCC(=O)N(C1=CC=CC=C1)[C@@]2(CCN(C[C@H]2C)CC(C3=CC=CC=C3)O)C(=O)OC; 3R,4S: CCC(=O)N(C1=CC=CC=C1)[C@]2(CCN(C[C@H]2C)CC(C3=CC=CC=C3)O)C(=O)OC
- InChI: 3R,4R: InChI=1S/C25H32N2O4/c1-4-23(29)27(21-13-9-6-10-14-21)25(24(30)31-3)15-16-26(17-19(25)2)18-22(28)20-11-7-5-8-12-20/h5-14,19,22,28H,4,15-18H2,1-3H3/t19-,22?,25-/m1/s1; Key:HVTQDIBOZUDMTH-PJHDFATGSA-N; 3R,4S: InChI=1S/C25H32N2O4/c1-4-23(29)27(21-13-9-6-10-14-21)25(24(30)31-3)15-16-26(17-19(25)2)18-22(28)20-11-7-5-8-12-20/h5-14,19,22,28H,4,15-18H2,1-3H3/t19-,22?,25+/m1/s1; Key:HVTQDIBOZUDMTH-CGPDNSSVSA-N

Ohmecarfentanil (RTI-4614-38), also known as Ohlofentanil, is a mu-opioid receptor agonist from the class of fentanyl analogues which was found to be 30,000 times more potent than morphine in a rhesus monkey single dose suppression test. This makes ohmecarfentanil, along with some closely related analogues, among the most potent opioid agonists known, even surpassing lofentanil and ohmefentanyl.

== See also ==
- Opioid potency comparison
