= C27H33NO4 =

The molecular formula C_{27}H_{33}NO_{4} (molar mass: 435.56 g/mol, exact mass: 435.2410 u) may refer to:

- Paxilline, a potassium channel blocker
- BU-48
