= N-Phenethylnoroxymorphone =

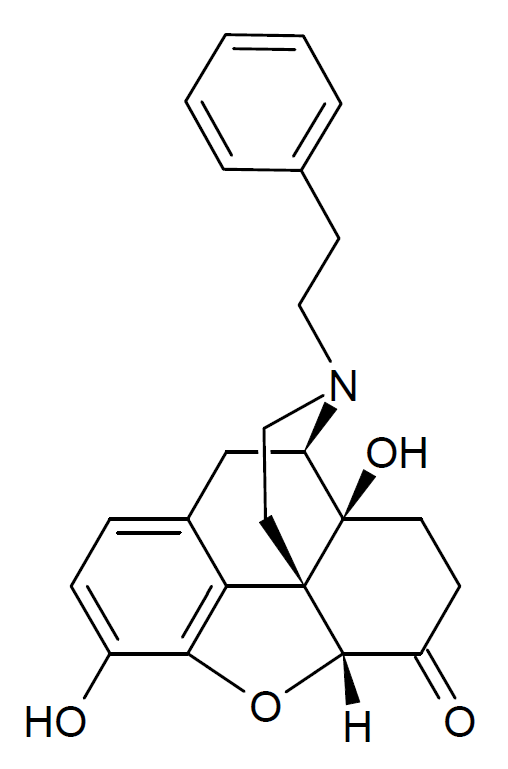

Identifiers
- IUPAC name: (4R,4aS,7aR,12bS)-4a,9-dihydroxy-3-(2-phenylethyl)-2,4,5,6,7a,13-hexahydro-1H-4,12-methanobenzofuro[3,2-e]isoquinolin-7-one
- CAS Number: 4778-94-3
- PubChem CID: 5492693
- ChemSpider: 4591110
- ChEMBL: ChEMBL3248741
- CompTox Dashboard (EPA): DTXSID10963935

Chemical and physical data
- Formula: C_{24}H_{25}NO_{4}
- Molar mass: 391.467 g·mol^{−1}
- 3D model (JSmol): Interactive image
- SMILES: C1C[C@]2([C@H]3CC4=C5[C@@]2(CCN3CCC6=CC=CC=C6)[C@H](C1=O)OC5=C(C=C4)O)O
- InChI: InChI=1S/C24H25NO4/c26-17-7-6-16-14-19-24(28)10-8-18(27)22-23(24,20(16)21(17)29-22)11-13-25(19)12-9-15-4-2-1-3-5-15/h1-7,19,22,26,28H,8-14H2/t19-,22+,23+,24-/m1/s1; Key:NDHIGBQXQCVRAU-QLBRKBSLSA-N

N-Phenethylnoroxymorphone is an opioid analgesic drug derived from oxymorphone by replacing the N-methyl group with β-phenethyl. It was first synthesised in Japan in the 1960s but has been relatively little studied, though it is known to be a potent opioid analgesic with around 12 times the potency of oxymorphone itself. It has subsequently appeared as a designer drug, first being reported in October 2023 in Pennsylvania, USA. An overdose death in Germany was reported in October 2026.

== See also ==
- N-Phenethylnormorphine
- N-Phenethylnordesomorphine
- Phenomorphan
- RAM-378
- Ro4-1539
