= C24H27NO2 =

The molecular formula C_{24}H_{27}NO_{2} (molar mass: 361.48 g/mol) may refer to:

- Levophenacylmorphan
- Octocrylene
- N-Phenethylnordesomorphine
