= SCH-221510 =

Nociceptin receptor agonist

Names
- IUPAC name (1S,5R)-8-[Bis(2-methylphenyl)methyl]-3-phenyl-8-azabicyclo[3.2.1]octan-3-ol

Identifiers
CAS Number	322473-89-2
3D model (JSmol)	Interactive image
ChEMBL	ChEMBL513136
ChemSpider	35143261
IUPHAR/BPS	8868
PubChem CID	24879901
CompTox Dashboard (EPA)	DTXSID10432414
- InChI: InChI=1S/C28H31NO/c1-20-10-6-8-14-25(20)27(26-15-9-7-11-21(26)2)29-23-16-17-24(29)19-28(30,18-23)22-12-4-3-5-13-22/h3-15,23-24,27,30H,16-19H2,1-2H3/t23-,24+,28? Key: LOSJNRBXNQTUNT-XUEDKKMFSA-N
- SMILES: CC1=CC=CC=C1C(C2=CC=CC=C2C)N3[C@@H]4CC[C@H]3CC(C4)(C5=CC=CC=C5)O

Properties
Chemical formula	C_{28}H_{31}NO
Molar mass	397.562 g·mol^{−1}
- Except where otherwise noted, data are given for materials in their standard state (at 25 °C [77 °F], 100 kPa). Infobox references

SCH-221510 is an experimental opioid drug. It has potential as an analgesic and as a treatment to addiction of certain drugs.

== Mechanism of action ==
Most opioid analgesics act through delta, mu, and kappa opioid receptors; however, SCH-221510 is instead an agonist at the nociceptin receptor.

== Analgesic effects ==
Classical opioid analgesics (such as morphine) usually have effects such as constipation, hypoventilation and addiction. However, by acting through a different receptor, SCH-221510 seems to be lacking the undesirable effects of morphine at equianalgesic doses. This suggests that SCH-221510 could be a better opioid than the currently available opioid pain medications, by having less side effects.

== Treatment of drug addiction ==
SCH-221510 might be an option in the treatment of certain drug addictions: it is able to decrease ethanol self-administration and was able to decrease self-administration of remifentanil, a fentanyl analogue, in a study,
