= C23H28N4O3 =

The molecular formula C_{23}H_{28}N_{4}O_{3} (molar mass: 408.50 g/mol) may refer to:

- Etonitazepipne (N-piperidino etonitazene)
- Isotonitazepyne
- Protonitazepyne
