= C28H37NO4 =

The molecular formula C_{28}H_{37}NO_{4} (molar mass: 451.607 g/mol) may refer to:

- Homprenorphine, M-5202
- TL 2636, M-125
