= Allylprodine =

Opioid analgesic drug

Clinical data
- Other names: Allylprodine
- ATC code: none

Legal status
- Legal status: AU: S9 (Prohibited substance); BR: Class A1 (Narcotic drugs); CA: Schedule I; DE: Anlage I (Authorized scientific use only); UK: Class A; US: Schedule I

Identifiers
- IUPAC name: 1-Methyl-4-phenyl-3-(prop-2-en-1-yl)piperidin-4-yl propanoate
- CAS Number: 25384-17-2
- PubChem CID: 32938
- DrugBank: DB01542
- ChemSpider: 30495
- UNII: 4343OEZ18O
- KEGG: D12662
- ChEMBL: ChEMBL2103995
- CompTox Dashboard (EPA): DTXSID80865210
- ECHA InfoCard: 100.291.534

Chemical and physical data
- Formula: C_{18}H_{25}NO_{2}
- Molar mass: 287.403 g·mol^{−1}
- 3D model (JSmol): Interactive image
- SMILES: O=C(CC)OC1(CCN(C)CC1CC=C)C2=CC=CC=C2
- InChI: InChI=1S/C18H25NO2/c1-4-9-16-14-19(3)13-12-18(16,21-17(20)5-2)15-10-7-6-8-11-15/h4,6-8,10-11,16H,1,5,9,12-14H2,2-3H3; Key:KGYFOSCXVAXULR-UHFFFAOYSA-N

Allylprodine is an opioid analgesic that is an analog of prodine. It was discovered by Hoffman-La Roche in 1957 during research into the related drug pethidine. Derivatives were tested to prove the theory that phenolic and non-phenolic opioids bind at different sites of the opiate receptor.

Allylprodine is more potent as an analgesic than similar drugs such as α-prodine, and the 3R,4S-isomer is 23 times more potent than morphine, due to the allyl group binding to an additional amino acid target in the binding site on the μ-opioid receptor. It is also stereoselective, with one isomer being much more active. When modeled in three dimensions, the alkene overlays the alkenes found in 14-cinnamoyloxycodeinone and in 14-allyloxycodeinone, re-enforcing the presence of an interaction of the alkene.

Allylprodine produces similar effects to other opioids, such as analgesia and sedation, along with side effects such as nausea, itching, vomiting and respiratory depression which may be harmful or fatal.

== Legal status ==
Allylprodine is regulated in most countries as is morphine, including being in Schedule I of the US Controlled Substances Act 1970 as a Narcotic with ACSCN 9602 and a 2014 annual aggregate manufacturing quota of 2 grams.

=== Australia ===
Allylprodine is considered a Schedule 9 prohibited substance in Australia under the Poisons Standard (February 2017). A Schedule 9 substance is a substance which may be abused or misused, the manufacture, possession, sale or use of which should be prohibited by law except when required for medical or scientific research, or for analytical, teaching or training purposes with approval of Commonwealth and/or State or Territory Health Authorities.

=== Germany ===
Allylprodine is illegal in Germany (Anlage I)
