= TAN-821 =

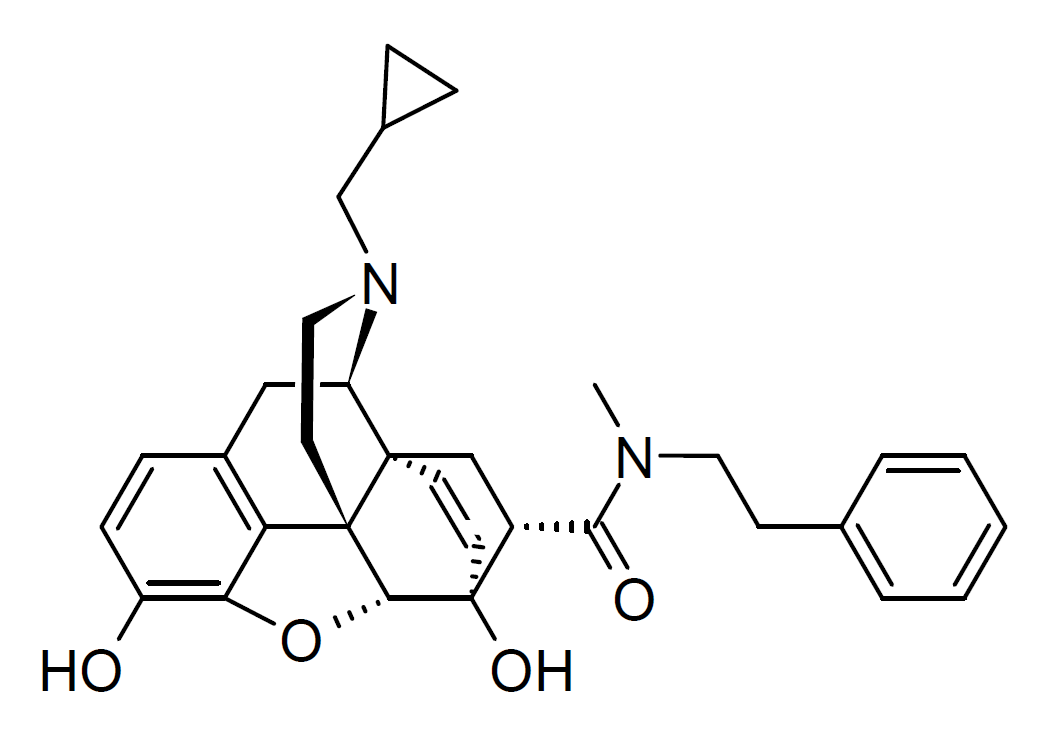

Identifiers
- IUPAC name: (1R,2S,6R,14R,15R,16S)-5-(cyclopropylmethyl)-11,15-dihydroxy-N-methyl-N-(2-phenylethyl)-13-oxa-5-azahexacyclo[13.2.2.1^{2,8}.0^{1,6}.0^{2,14}.0^{12,20}]icosa-8(20),9,11,18-tetraene-16-carboxamide
- PubChem CID: 46907011
- ChemSpider: 25032059
- ChEMBL: ChEMBL1163923

Chemical and physical data
- Formula: C_{32}H_{36}N_{2}O_{4}
- Molar mass: 512.650 g·mol^{−1}
- 3D model (JSmol): Interactive image
- SMILES: CN(CCC1=CC=CC=C1)C(=O)[C@H]2C[C@@]34C=C[C@@]2([C@H]5[C@@]36CCN([C@@H]4CC7=C6C(=C(C=C7)O)O5)CC8CC8)O
- InChI: InChI=1S/C32H36N2O4/c1-33(15-11-20-5-3-2-4-6-20)28(36)23-18-30-12-13-32(23,37)29-31(30)14-16-34(19-21-7-8-21)25(30)17-22-9-10-24(35)27(38-29)26(22)31/h2-6,9-10,12-13,21,23,25,29,35,37H,7-8,11,14-19H2,1H3/t23-,25-,29-,30-,31+,32-/m1/s1; Key:XTSYSSUSRFOCHS-ZZVPPEEFSA-N

TAN-821 is an opioid drug which was originally reported as an agonist for the putative ε-opioid receptor, however this is now thought not to be a separate opioid receptor in its own right but is more likely a heteromer made from hybridisation of known opioid receptor subunits. It has subsequently been shown to have potent affinity for the kappa opioid receptor.

== See also ==
- CYM51010
