= MR-2096 =

Chemical compound

Identifiers
- IUPAC name: (4R,4aS,7aR,12bS)-4a,9-dihydroxy-3-([(R)-tetrahydrofuran-2-yl]methyl)-2,3,4,4a,5,6-hexahydro-1H-4,12-methanobenzofuro[3,2-e]isoquinolin-7(7aH)one
- CAS Number: 62509-10-8
- PubChem CID: 5748260
- ChemSpider: 4677855
- CompTox Dashboard (EPA): DTXSID30211526

Chemical and physical data
- Formula: C_{21}H_{25}NO_{5}
- Molar mass: 371.433 g·mol^{−1}
- 3D model (JSmol): Interactive image
- SMILES: O[C@]1([C@H]2C3)[C@@]4(CCN2C[C@H]5CCCO5)C6=C3C=CC(O)=C6O[C@H]4C(CC1)=O
- InChI: InChI=1S/C21H25NO5/c23-14-4-3-12-10-16-21(25)6-5-15(24)19-20(21,17(12)18(14)27-19)7-8-22(16)11-13-2-1-9-26-13/h3-4,13,16,19,23,25H,1-2,5-11H2/t13-,16-,19+,20+,21-/m1/s1; Key:JZVPTJLHOJSOLQ-JAYNPZNESA-N

MR-2096 is an opioid analgesic drug related to oxymorphone. It has an unusual chiral tetrahydrofuran-2-ylmethyl substitution on the nitrogen which determines the character of effects, with the (R) enantiomer MR-2096 being an opioid agonist, while the (S) enantiomer MR-2097 has similarly potent opioid antagonist effects. This mix of activities has made these two enantiomers useful for characterising the binding site of the mu opioid receptor.

== See also ==
- N-Phenethylnormorphine
- Ro4-1539
