= 14-Methoxydihydromorphinone =

Names
- IUPAC name 3-Hydroxy-14-methoxy-17-methyl-4,5α-epoxymorphinan-6-one
- Systematic IUPAC name (4R,4aS,7aR,12bS)-9-Hydroxy-4a-methoxy-3-methyl-2,3,4,4a,5,6-hexahydro-1H-4,12-methano[1]benzofuro[3,2-e]isoquinolin-7(7aH)-one

Identifiers
3D model (JSmol)	Interactive image
ChEMBL	ChEMBL607405
ChemSpider	24675846
PubChem CID	13559325
CompTox Dashboard (EPA)	DTXSID301032748
- InChI: InChI=1S/C18H21NO4/c1-19-8-7-17-14-10-3-4-11(20)15(14)23-16(17)12(21)5-6-18(17,22-2)13(19)9-10/h3-4,13,16,20H,5-9H2,1-2H3/t13-,16+,17+,18-/m1/s1 Key: FCIDDJPMOSRHJG-XFKAJCMBSA-N
- SMILES: CO[C@]12CCC(=O)[C@@H]3OC4=C5C(C[C@H]1N(C)CC[C@@]235)=CC=C4O

Properties
Chemical formula	C_{18}H_{21}NO_{4}
Molar mass	315.369 g·mol^{−1}
- Except where otherwise noted, data are given for materials in their standard state (at 25 °C [77 °F], 100 kPa). Infobox references

14-Methoxydihydromorphinone is a semi-synthetic opioid related to 14-methoxymetopon (14-MM), an opioid with a K_{i} of 0.15 nM, and 14-O-methyloxymorphone (14-OMO) with a K_{i} of 0.10 nM. By contrast, oxymorphone has a K_{i} of 0.97 nM and morphine one of 6.55 nM (all at mu receptors). This suggests that both 14-OMO and 14-MM have a higher mu/kappa selectivity than oxymorphone.

== See also ==
- Metopon
