= M320 (opioid) =

Chemical compound

Clinical data
- Other names: (5α,6β,14β,18R)-17-(Cyclopropylmethyl)-18-[(2R)-2-hydroxy-5-methyl-2-hexanyl]-6-methoxy-7,8-didehydro-18,19-dihydro-4,5-epoxy-6,14-ethenomorphinan-3-ol
- ATC code: none

Legal status
- Legal status: UK: Under Psychoactive Substances Act

Identifiers
- IUPAC name: (1R,2S,6R,14R,15R,19R)-5-(Cyclopropylmethyl)-19-[(2R)-2-hydroxy-5-methylhexan-2-yl]-15-methoxy-13-oxa-5-azahexacyclo[13.2.2.1^{2,8}.0^{1,6}.0^{2,14}.0^{12,20}]icosa-8(20),9,11,16-tetraen-11-ol
- PubChem CID: 71717732
- ChemSpider: 29420445
- ChEMBL: ChEMBL2338714

Chemical and physical data
- Formula: C_{30}H_{41}NO_{4}
- Molar mass: 479.661 g·mol^{−1}
- 3D model (JSmol): Interactive image
- SMILES: CC(C)CC[C@](C)([C@H]1C[C@@]23C=C[C@@]1([C@H]4[C@@]25CCN([C@@H]3CC6=C5C(=C(C=C6)O)O4)CC7CC7)OC)O
- InChI: InChI=1S/C30H41NO4/c1-18(2)9-10-27(3,33)22-16-28-11-12-30(22,34-4)26-29(28)13-14-31(17-19-5-6-19)23(28)15-20-7-8-21(32)25(35-26)24(20)29/h7-8,11-12,18-19,22-23,26,32-33H,5-6,9-10,13-17H2,1-4H3/t22-,23-,26-,27-,28-,29+,30-/m1/s1; Key:MFIWLPVODKSMKX-XELDOGJXSA-N

M320 is an extremely potent and long acting opioid. It produces long lasting narcosis in different animals, including mice, rats, cats, guinea pigs, dogs and monkeys. M320 is a μ and κ-opioid receptor agonist. Similarly to TL 2636, M320 tends to produce pronounced nausea and vomiting due to its potent agonist activity at both the μ and κ-opioid receptors at the same time.

== See also ==
- Bentley compounds
- BU72
- Carfentanil
- Etonitazene
- Etorphine (M99)
- Fentanyl
- TH-030418
