= R-30490 =

Opioid analgesic

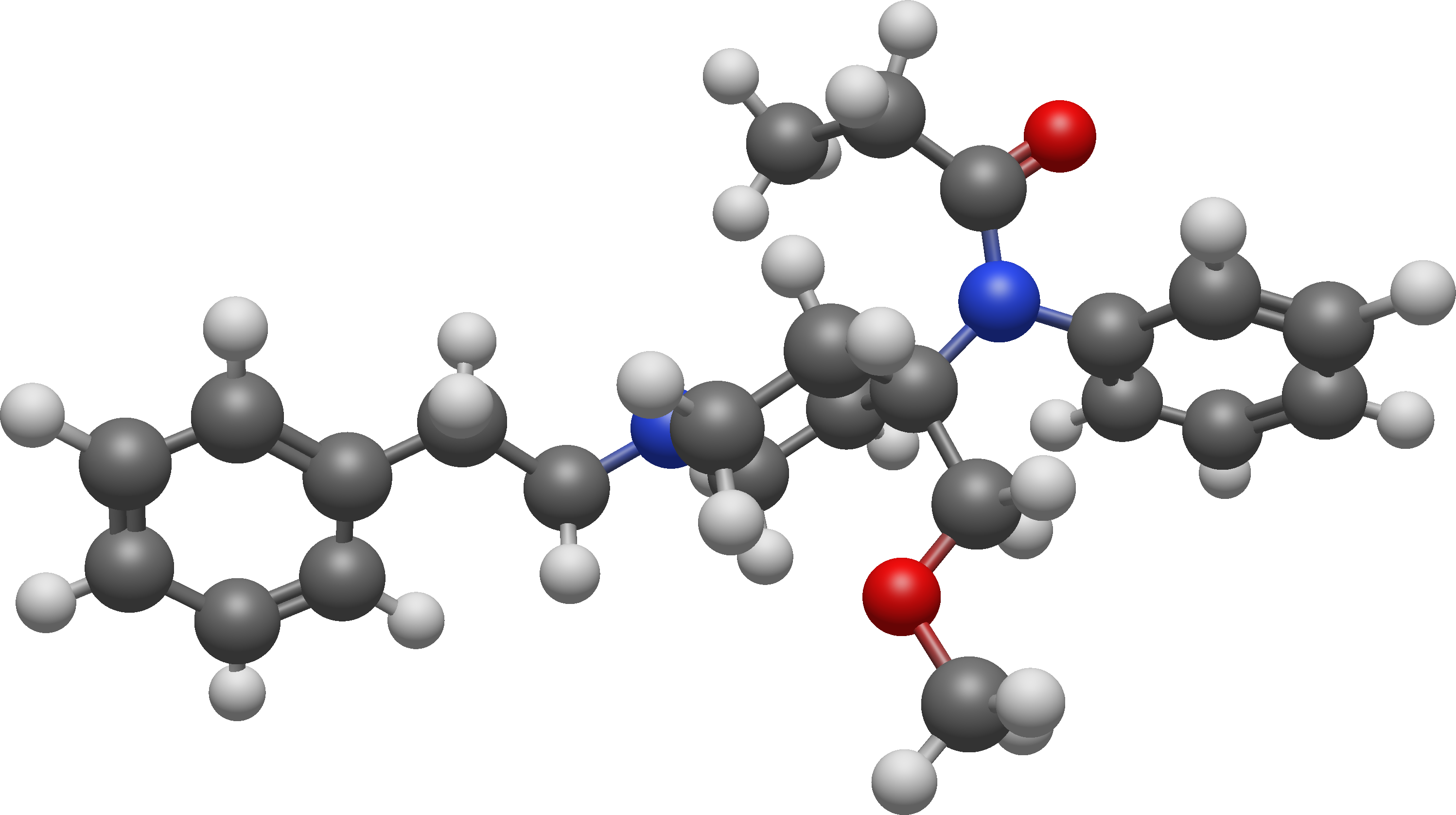

Legal status
- Legal status: CA: Schedule I; UK: Class A; US: Schedule I

Identifiers
- IUPAC name: N-[4-(Methoxymethyl)-1-(2-phenylethyl)piperidin-4-yl]-N-phenylpropanamide
- CAS Number: 60618-49-7
- PubChem CID: 124716
- DrugBank: DB09179
- ChemSpider: 111042
- UNII: 03DNV05OD4
- ChEMBL: ChEMBL609147
- CompTox Dashboard (EPA): DTXSID30209423

Chemical and physical data
- Formula: C_{24}H_{32}N_{2}O_{2}
- Molar mass: 380.532 g·mol^{−1}
- 3D model (JSmol): Interactive image
- SMILES: CCC(=O)N(c1ccccc1)C2(COC)CCN(CC2)CCc3ccccc3
- InChI: InChI=1S/C24H32N2O2/c1-3-23(27)26(22-12-8-5-9-13-22)24(20-28-2)15-18-25(19-16-24)17-14-21-10-6-4-7-11-21/h4-13H,3,14-20H2,1-2H3; Key:GARXJOUQUSNOGK-UHFFFAOYSA-N

R-30490 (also known as 4-methoxymethylfentanyl) is an opioid analgesic related to the highly potent animal tranquilizer carfentanil, and with only slightly lower potency. It was first synthesised by a team of chemists at Janssen Pharmaceutica led by Paul Janssen, who were investigating the structure-activity relationships of the fentanyl family of drugs. R-30490 was found to be the most selective agonist for the μ-opioid receptor out of all the fentanyl analogues tested, but it has never been introduced for medical use in humans, although the closely related drug sufentanil is widely used for analgesia and anesthesia during major surgery.

Side effects of fentanyl analogs are similar to those of fentanyl itself, which include itching, nausea and potentially serious respiratory depression, which can be life-threatening. Fentanyl analogs have killed hundreds of people throughout Europe and the former Soviet republics since the most recent resurgence in use began in Estonia in the early 2000s, and novel derivatives continue to appear.

== See also ==
- Carfentanil
- List of fentanyl analogues
- Opioid potency comparison
