= BU08028 =

Chemical compound

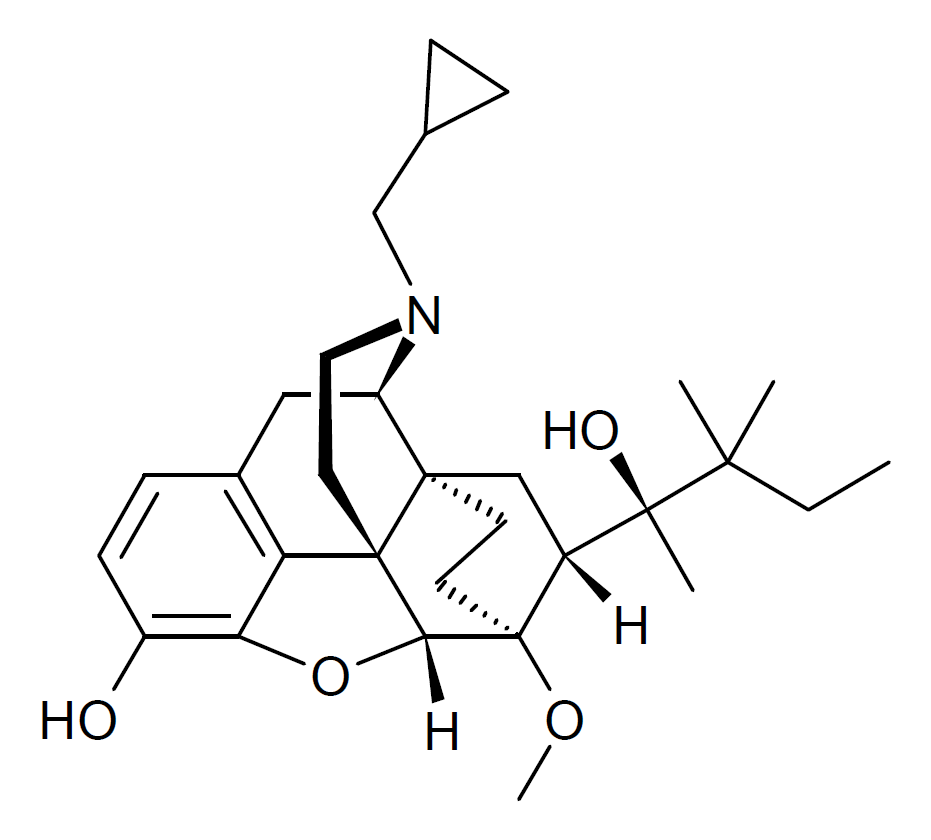

Identifiers
- IUPAC name: (1S,2S,6R,14R,15R,16R)-5-(cyclopropylmethyl)-16-[(2S)-2-hydroxy-3,3-dimethylpentan-2-yl]-15-methoxy-13-oxa-5-azahexacyclo[13.2.2.1^{2,8}.0^{1,6}.0^{2,14}.0^{12,20}]icosa-8(20),9,11-trien-11-ol
- CAS Number: 1333904-22-5
- PubChem CID: 50922685
- ChemSpider: 58145089

Chemical and physical data
- Formula: C_{30}H_{43}NO_{4}
- Molar mass: 481.677 g·mol^{−1}
- 3D model (JSmol): Interactive image
- SMILES: CCC(C)(C)[C@](C)([C@H]1C[C@@]23CC[C@@]1([C@H]4[C@@]25CCN([C@@H]3CC6=C5C(=C(C=C6)O)O4)CC7CC7)OC)O
- InChI: InChI=1S/C30H43NO4/c1-6-26(2,3)27(4,33)21-16-28-11-12-30(21,34-5)25-29(28)13-14-31(17-18-7-8-18)22(28)15-19-9-10-20(32)24(35-25)23(19)29/h9-10,18,21-22,25,32-33H,6-8,11-17H2,1-5H3/t21-,22-,25-,27+,28-,29+,30-/m1/s1; Key:HBENZIXOGRCSQN-VQWWACLZSA-N

BU08028 is a drug which acts as an extremely potent partial agonist at both the μ-opioid receptor and nociceptin receptor. It is a homologue of buprenorphine extended by just one carbon on the side chain, but has relatively greater intrinsic activity at the nociceptin receptor, which is thought to reduce the abuse potential without compromising analgesia.

== See also ==
- BU-48
- BU72
