= TH-030418 =

Names
- IUPAC name 7α-[(R)-1-hydroxy-1-methyl-3-(thiophen-3-yl)-propyl]-6,14-endo-ethanotetrahydrooripavine

Identifiers
CAS Number	1374406-56-0
3D model (JSmol)	Interactive image
- InChI: InChI=1S/C28H35NO4S/c1-25(31,9-8-18-5-4-14-34-18)20-16-26-10-11-28(20,32-3)24-27(26)12-13-29(2)21(26)15-17-6-7-19(30)23(33-24)22(17)27/h4-7,14,20-21,24,30-31H,8-13,15-16H2,1-3H3/t20?,21-,24-,25?,26?,27+,28?/m1/s1 Key: XHPBFKQABAJWQT-ZAEBSCISSA-N
- SMILES: OC1=C(O[C@H]2C(OC)(CC6)C(C(O)(C)CCC7=CC=CS7)CC36[C@@]42CCN5C)C4=C(C[C@H]35)C=C1
- Except where otherwise noted, data are given for materials in their standard state (at 25 °C [77 °F], 100 kPa). Infobox references

TH-030418 is an extremely potent opioid related to thienorphine. TH-030418 carries about 5,000 times the potency of morphine.

== See also ==
- BU72
- Dihydroetorphine
- Etorphine (M99)
- M320
