= BU-48 =

Chemical compound

Identifiers
- IUPAC name: N-Cyclopropylmethyl-[7α,8α,2',3']-cyclohexano-1'[S]-hydroxy-6,14-endo-ethenotetrahydronororipavine
- PubChem CID: 10003114
- ChemSpider: 58178410

Chemical and physical data
- Formula: C_{27}H_{33}NO_{4}
- Molar mass: 435.564 g·mol^{−1}
- 3D model (JSmol): Interactive image
- SMILES: CO[C@]12C=C[C@@]3([C@H]4[C@@H]1[C@H](CCC4)O)[C@H]5Cc6ccc(c7c6[C@]3([C@H]2O7)CCN5CC8CC8)O
- InChI: InChI=1S/C27H33NO4/c1-31-27-10-9-25(17-3-2-4-18(29)22(17)27)20-13-16-7-8-19(30)23-21(16)26(25,24(27)32-23)11-12-28(20)14-15-5-6-15/h7-10,15,17-18,20,22,24,29-30H,2-6,11-14H2,1H3/t17-,18+,20-,22-,24-,25-,26+,27-/m1/s1; Key:LMFRYUPWVALVRA-QDFTYCMYSA-N

BU-48 is a drug that is used in scientific research. It is from the oripavine family, related to better-known drugs such as etorphine and buprenorphine.

The parent compound from which BU-48 was derived (with N-methyl rather than methylcyclopropyl on the nitrogen and lacking the aliphatic hydroxyl group) is a powerful μ-opioid agonist 1000 times more potent than morphine, but in contrast BU-48 has only weak analgesic effects and instead acts primarily as a δ-opioid agonist. Its main effects are to produce convulsions, but it may also have antidepressant effects.

== See also ==
- BU72
- BU08028
