= 4-Phenylfentanyl =

Opioid analgesic

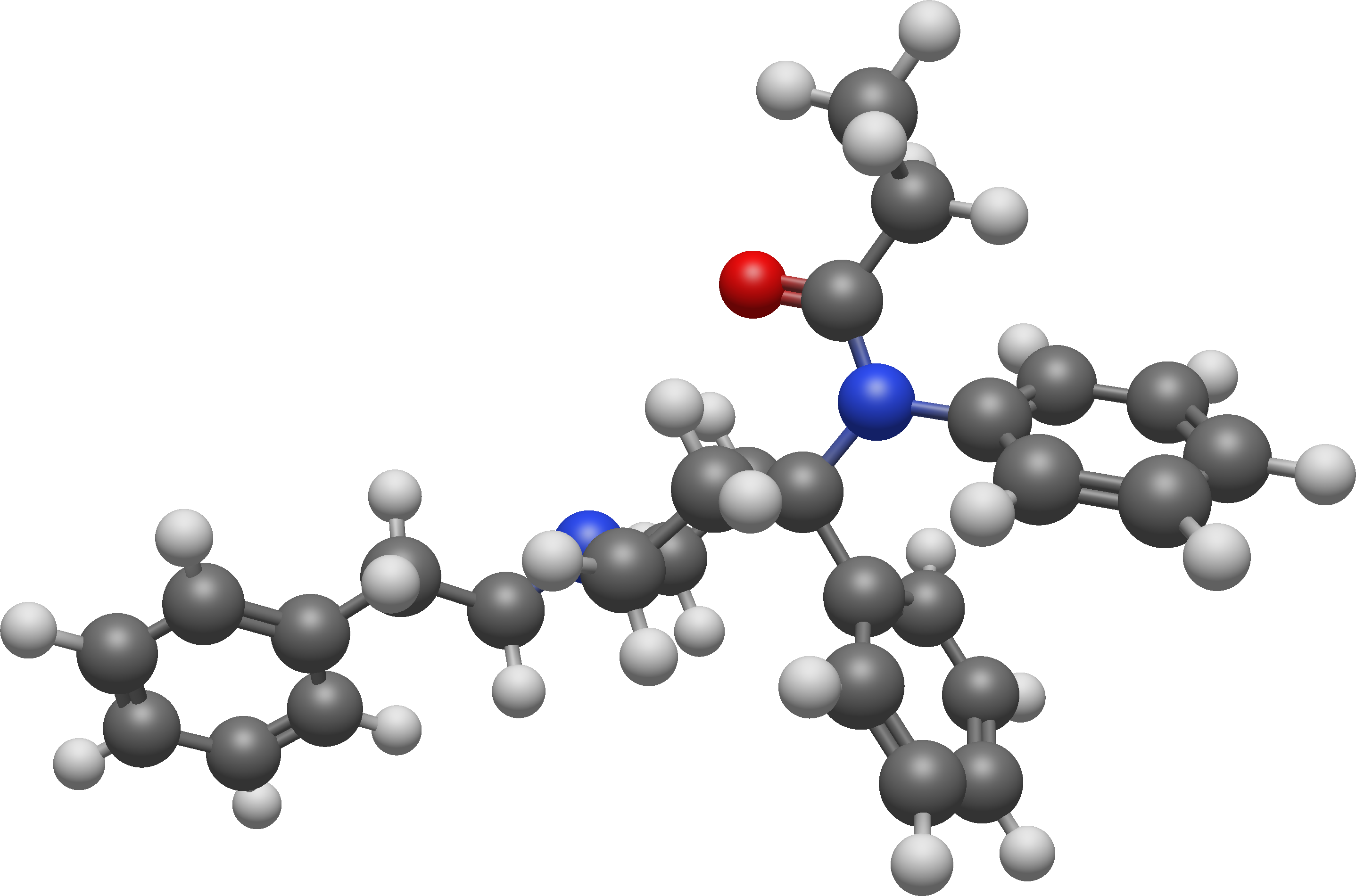

Clinical data
- ATC code: none

Legal status
- Legal status: CA: Schedule I; UK: Class A; US: Schedule I

Identifiers
- IUPAC name: N-Phenyl-N-[4-phenyl-1-(2-phenylethyl)piperidin-4-yl]propanamide
- CAS Number: 120448-97-7
- PubChem CID: 10319503
- DrugBank: DB09168
- ChemSpider: 8494967
- UNII: L9P31JAO37
- ChEBI: CHEBI:234274
- CompTox Dashboard (EPA): DTXSID001018402

Chemical and physical data
- Formula: C_{28}H_{32}N_{2}O
- Molar mass: 412.577 g·mol^{−1}
- 3D model (JSmol): Interactive image
- SMILES: c3ccccc3CCN(CC2)CCC2(c1ccccc1)N(C(=O)CC)c4ccccc4
- InChI: InChI=1S/C28H32N2O/c1-2-27(31)30(26-16-10-5-11-17-26)28(25-14-8-4-9-15-25)19-22-29(23-20-28)21-18-24-12-6-3-7-13-24/h3-17H,2,18-23H2,1H3; Key:BXCJXJLHYMWMQU-UHFFFAOYSA-N

4-Phenylfentanyl is an opioid analgesic that is a derivative of fentanyl. It was developed during the course of research that ultimately resulted in super-potent opioid derivatives such as carfentanil, though it is a substantially less potent analogue. 4-Phenylfentanyl is around eight times the potency of fentanyl in analgesic tests on animals, but more complex 4-heteroaryl derivatives such as substituted thiophenes and thiazoles are more potent still, as they are closer bioisosteres to the 4-carbomethoxy group of carfentanil.

Side effects of fentanyl analogs are similar to those of fentanyl itself, which include itching, nausea and potentially serious respiratory depression, which can be life-threatening. Fentanyl analogs have killed hundreds of people throughout Europe and the former Soviet republics since the most recent resurgence in use began in Estonia in the early 2000s, and novel derivatives continue to appear.
