= 14-Hydroxycodeine =

Names
- Systematic IUPAC name (4R,4aS,7S,7aR,12bS)-9-methoxy-3-methyl-1,2,4,7,7a,13-hexahydro-4,12-methanobenzofuro[3,2-e]isoquinoline-4a,7-diol
- Other names Morphinan-6,14-diol, 7,8-didehydro-4,5-epoxy-3-methoxy-17-methyl-, (5alpha,6alpha)-

Identifiers
CAS Number	4829-46-3
3D model (JSmol)	Interactive image
PubChem CID	14261327
UNII	332OI8E5Z4
CompTox Dashboard (EPA)	DTXSID50197474
- InChI: InChI=1S/C18H21NO4/c1-19-8-7-17-14-10-3-4-12(22-2)15(14)23-16(17)11(20)5-6-18(17,21)13(19)9-10/h3-6,11,13,16,20-21H,7-9H2,1-2H3/t11-,13+,16-,17-,18+/m0/s1 Key: WYMBHLXUDPDGQJ-BRJGLHKUSA-N; InChI=1S/C18H21NO4/c1-19-8-7-17-14-10-3-4-12(22-2)15(14)23-16(17)11(20)5-6-18(17,21)13(19)9-10/h3-6,11,13,16,20-21H,7-9H2,1-2H3/t11-,13+,16-,17-,18+/m0/s1 Key: YPZPXTZKBNWUTF-QMVVXIJUSA-N
- SMILES: CN1CC[C@]23[C@@H]4[C@H](C=C[C@]2([C@H]1CC5=C3C(=C(C=C5)OC)O4)O)O

Properties
Chemical formula	C_{18}H_{21}NO_{4}
Molar mass	315.4 g/mol

Hazards
- GHS labelling
Pictograms	(GHS08: Health hazard) (GHS07: Exclamation mark)
Signal word	Danger
Hazard statements	H302, H317, H332, H334
Precautionary statements	P233, P260, P264, P270, P271, P272, P280, P284, P301+P317, P302+P352, P304+P340, P317, P321, P330, P333+P317, P342+P316, P362+P364, P403, P501
- Except where otherwise noted, data are given for materials in their standard state (at 25 °C [77 °F], 100 kPa). Infobox references

14-Hydroxycodeine also known as hydroxycodeine, is an toxic opioid, and also an alkaloid an organic compound that is a minor natural product found in some plants and is an important intermediate in the synthesis of potent opioid analgesics such as oxycodone and other 14-hydroxylated opiate drugs. It is not used as a standalone drug and has no medical use. 14-Hydroxycodeine is an alkaloid component of the plant Papaver bracteatum.

Transformations occurring during bacterial oxidation of codeine by Streptomyces griseus: 14-hydroxycodeine and norcodeine were rigorously identified as products arising from codeine oxidation by Streptomyces griseus.

== Toxicity ==
14-Hydroxycodeine is a toxic substance, acute toxic substance upon ingestion and inhalation, causes skin sensitization (contact dermatitis) and subsequent hypersensitivity to specific substances and severe allergic reactions. Possesses acute toxicity when inhaled or may cause allergy or asthma symptoms or breathing difficulties if inhaled.

== Chemistry ==
14-Hydroxycodeine is an N-methyl-14-hydroxy derivative of codeine, where hydroxylation occurs at the carbon atom in position 14 of the morphinan skeleton.
