= TL 2636 =

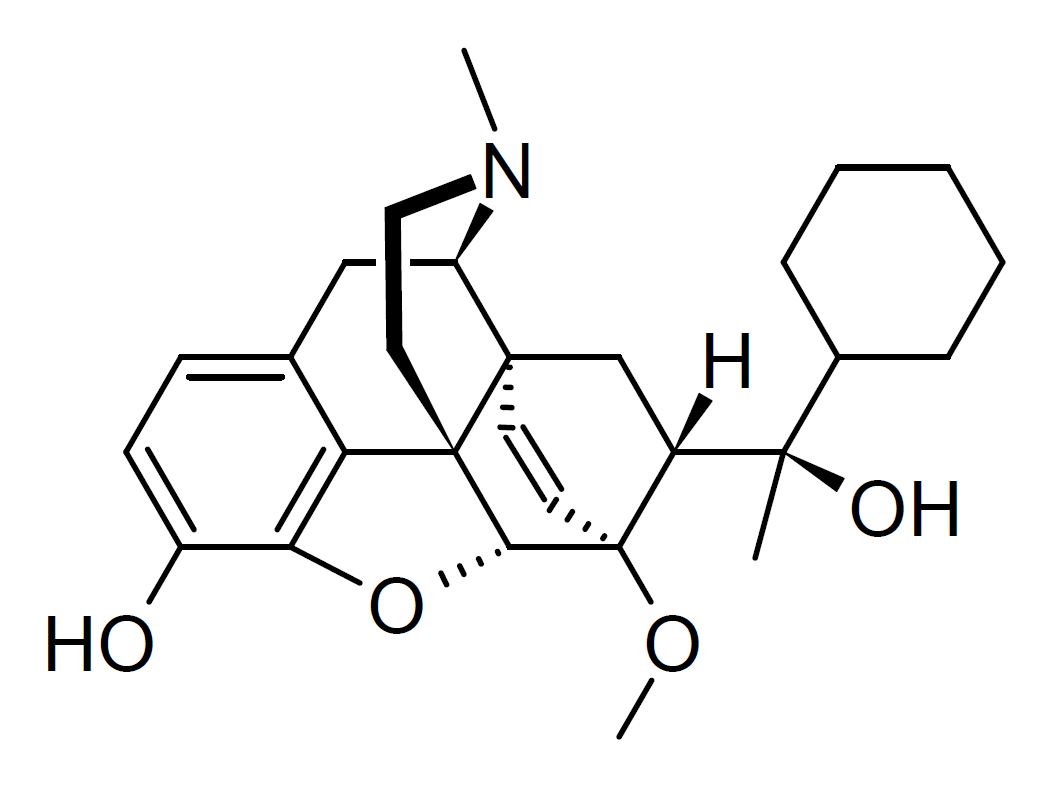

Identifiers
- IUPAC name: α-Cyclohexyl-4,5α-epoxy-3-hydroxy-6-methoxy-α,17-dimethyl-6,14-ethenomorphinan-7-methanol
- CAS Number: 16758-47-7
- PubChem CID: 204640
- ChemSpider: 177249
- CompTox Dashboard (EPA): DTXSID70937354

Chemical and physical data
- Formula: C_{28}H_{37}NO_{4}
- Molar mass: 451.607 g·mol^{−1}
- 3D model (JSmol): Interactive image
- SMILES: CC([C@H]1CC23C=C[C@]1([C@H]4[C@@]25CCN([C@@H]3CC6=C5C(=C(C=C6)O)O4)C)OC)(C7CCCCC7)O
- InChI: InChI=1S/C28H37NO4/c1-25(31,18-7-5-4-6-8-18)20-16-26-11-12-28(20,32-3)24-27(26)13-14-29(2)21(26)15-17-9-10-19(30)23(33-24)22(17)27/h9-12,18,20-21,24,30-31H,4-8,13-16H2,1-3H3/t20-,21-,24-,25?,26?,27+,28+/m1/s1; Key:SHOLSAOUSMCLOR-HGRVVPQMSA-N

TL 2636 (M-125) is an opioid drug derived from thebaine, one of the bridged oripavine family of drugs known as the Bentley compounds which includes drugs such as buprenorphine and etorphine. TL 2636 is closely related to etorphine and is a similarly potent opioid analgesic and sedative, but at low doses is characterised by producing pronounced nausea and vomiting, with a long duration of action. It was investigated as a potential incapacitating agent but was not successful due to a poor therapeutic index.

== See also ==
- Apomorphine
- Emetine
- M320
