= RAM-378 =

Chemical compound

Identifiers
- IUPAC name: 3,6,14-trihydroxy-4,5α-epoxy-17-(2-phenylethyl)morphinan
- CAS Number: 4778-96-5
- PubChem CID: 5492826
- ChemSpider: 4591168
- UNII: JD4S8J3CMK
- CompTox Dashboard (EPA): DTXSID70963936

Chemical and physical data
- Formula: C_{24}H_{27}NO_{4}
- Molar mass: 393.483 g·mol^{−1}
- 3D model (JSmol): Interactive image
- SMILES: C1C[C@]2([C@H]3CC4=C5[C@@]2(CCN3CCC6=CC=CC=C6)[C@H]([C@H]1O)OC5=C(C=C4)O)O
- InChI: InChI=1S/C24H27NO4/c26-17-7-6-16-14-19-24(28)10-8-18(27)22-23(24,20(16)21(17)29-22)11-13-25(19)12-9-15-4-2-1-3-5-15/h1-7,18-19,22,26-28H,8-14H2/t18-,19+,22-,23-,24+/m0/s1; Key:GAHRZWMAHDWVCL-VKJMTUIMSA-N

RAM-378(7,8-Dihydro-14-hydroxy-N-phenethylnormorphine) is an opioid analgesic. It is the N-phenethyl derivative of hydromorphinol.

== See also ==
- 14-Cinnamoyloxycodeinone
- 14-Phenylpropoxymetopon
- 7-PET
- N-Phenethylnormorphine
- N-Phenethylnoroxymorphone
- N-Phenethyl-14-ethoxymetopon
- Phenomorphan
- Ro4-1539
