= CYM51010 =

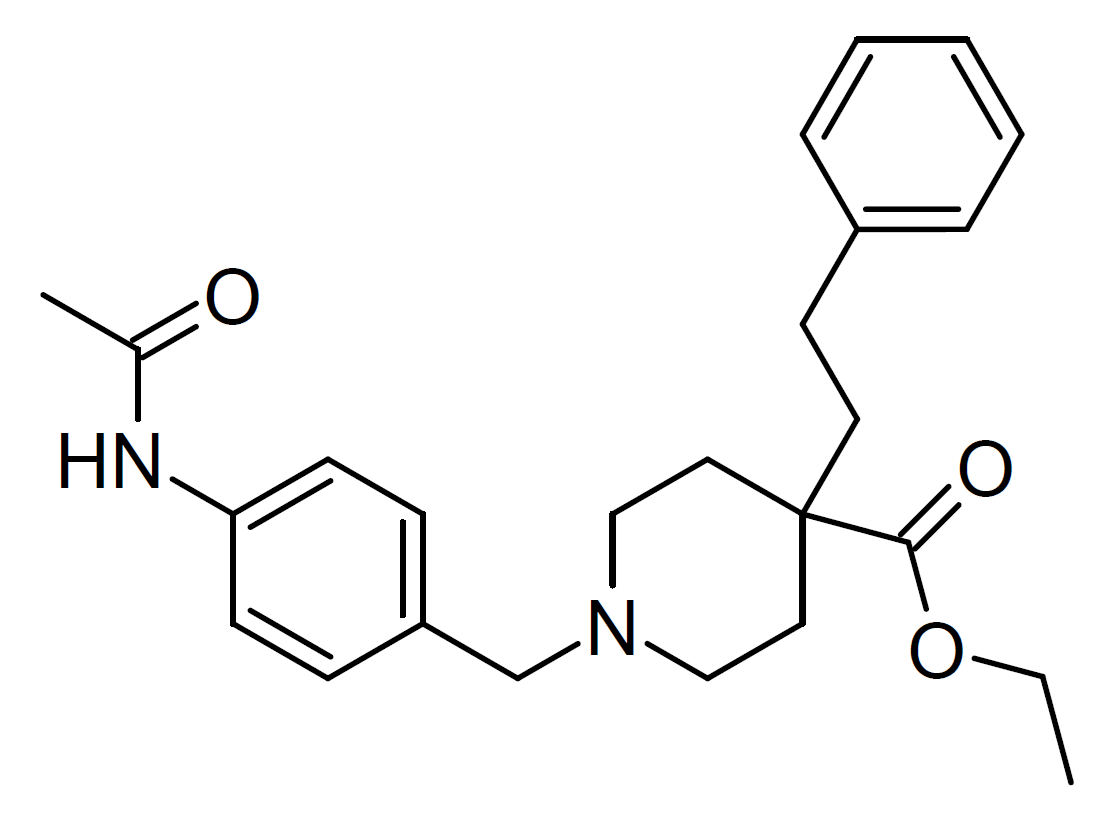

Identifiers
- IUPAC name: ethyl 1-[(4-acetamidophenyl)methyl]-4-(2-phenylethyl)piperidine-4-carboxylate
- CAS Number: 1069498-96-9
- PubChem CID: 23723457
- ChemSpider: 22208715
- ChEMBL: ChEMBL1612697

Chemical and physical data
- Formula: C_{25}H_{32}N_{2}O_{3}
- Molar mass: 408.542 g·mol^{−1}
- 3D model (JSmol): Interactive image
- SMILES: CCOC(=O)C1(CCN(CC1)CC2=CC=C(C=C2)NC(=O)C)CCC3=CC=CC=C3
- InChI: InChI=1S/C25H32N2O3/c1-3-30-24(29)25(14-13-21-7-5-4-6-8-21)15-17-27(18-16-25)19-22-9-11-23(12-10-22)26-20(2)28/h4-12H,3,13-19H2,1-2H3,(H,26,28); Key:VUXRYYSKTWDPLO-UHFFFAOYSA-N

CYM51010 is an opioid drug which acts as a selective agonist for the μOR-δOR heteromer, with little affinity for the normal form of the mu opioid receptor or delta opioid receptor. It has analgesic effects but with a reduced side effect profile compared to typical mu opioid agonists.

== See also ==
- TAN-821
