= N-Phenethylnormorphine =

Chemical compound

Identifiers
- IUPAC name: 3,6-dihydroxy-7,8-didehydro-4,5α-epoxy-17-(2-phenylethyl)morphinan
- PubChem CID: 46908217
- ChemSpider: 34254115
- ChEMBL: ChEMBL3275472
- CompTox Dashboard (EPA): DTXSID101018229

Chemical and physical data
- Formula: C_{24}H_{25}NO_{3}
- Molar mass: 375.468 g·mol^{−1}
- 3D model (JSmol): Interactive image
- SMILES: c1ccc(cc1)CCN2CC[C@]34c5c6ccc(c5O[C@H]3[C@H](C=C[C@H]4[C@H]2C6)O)O
- InChI: InChI=1S/C24H25NO3/c26-19-8-6-16-14-18-17-7-9-20(27)23-24(17,21(16)22(19)28-23)11-13-25(18)12-10-15-4-2-1-3-5-15/h1-9,17-18,20,23,26-27H,10-14H2/t17-,18+,20-,23-,24-/m0/s1; Key:BXKJGGVENHTVBF-JFDOVZFRSA-N

N-Phenethylnormorphine is an opioid analgesic drug derived from morphine by replacing the N-methyl group with β-phenethyl. It is around eight to fourteen times more potent than morphine as a result of this modification, in contrast to most other N-substituted derivatives of morphine, which are substantially less active, or act as antagonists. Binding studies have helped to explain the increased potency of N-phenethylnormorphine, showing that the phenethyl group extends out to reach an additional binding point deeper inside the μ-opioid receptor cleft, analogous to the binding of the phenethyl group on fentanyl.

== See also ==
- 14-Cinnamoyloxycodeinone
- 14-Phenylpropoxymetopon
- 7-PET
- MR-2096
- N-Phenethyl-14-ethoxymetopon
- N-Phenethylnordesomorphine
- N-Phenethylnoroxymorphone
- Phenomorphan
- RAM-378
- Ro4-1539
