= Homolycorine =

Names
- IUPAC name 9,10-Dimethoxy-1-methyllycorenan-7-one
- Systematic IUPAC name (5aR,11bS,11cS)-9,10-Dimethoxy-1-methyl-2,3,5,5a,11b,11c-hexahydro[2]benzopyrano[3,4-g]indol-7(1H)-one

Identifiers
| CAS Number | 477-20-3 |
| 3D model (JSmol) | Interactive image |
| ChEMBL | ChEMBL1221973 |
| ChemSpider | 141017 |
| PubChem CID | 160473 |
| UNII | T95J9AUU63 |
| CompTox Dashboard (EPA) | DTXSID80963902 |
- InChI: InChI=1S/C18H21NO4/c1-19-7-6-10-4-5-13-16(17(10)19)11-8-14(21-2)15(22-3)9-12(11)18(20)23-13/h4,8-9,13,16-17H,5-7H2,1-3H3/t13-,16-,17-/m1/s1 Key: WXZAKVLYZHWSNF-KBRIMQKVSA-N
- SMILES: COc1cc2[C@@H]3[C@@H](CC=C4CCN(C)[C@@H]34)OC(=O)c2cc1OC

Properties
| Chemical formula | C_{18}H_{21}NO_{4} |
| Molar mass | 315.369 g·mol^{−1} |
- Except where otherwise noted, data are given for materials in their standard state (at 25 °C [77 °F], 100 kPa). (what is ?) Infobox references

Homolycorine is one of a number of toxic alkaloids found in various Amaryllidaceae species such as daffodils (Narcissus).

== Sources ==
- Four new Amaryllidaceae alkaloids from Zephyranthes candida. Shitara N, Hirasawa Y, Hasumi S, Sasaki T, Matsumoto M, Wong CP, Kaneda T, Asakawa Y, Morita H (2014 Jul) Journal of natural medicines, 68(3):610-4
- Acta Crystallographica
- T. Kitagawa, W. I. Taylor, S. Uyeo and H. Yajima. The constitution of homolycorine and lycorenine J. Chem. Soc., 1955, 1066-1068 DOI: 10.1039/JR9550001066
- Bastida, Jaume; Lavilla, Rodolfo; Viladomat, Francesc Viladomat (2006). Cordell, G. A. (ed.). Chemical and biological aspects of "Narcissus" alkaloids. The Alkaloids: Chemistry and Biology. Vol. 63. pp. 87–179. doi:10.1016/S1099-4831(06)63003-4. ISBN 9780124695634. PMC 7118783. PMID 17133715.
