= Lofentanil =

Opioid analgesic

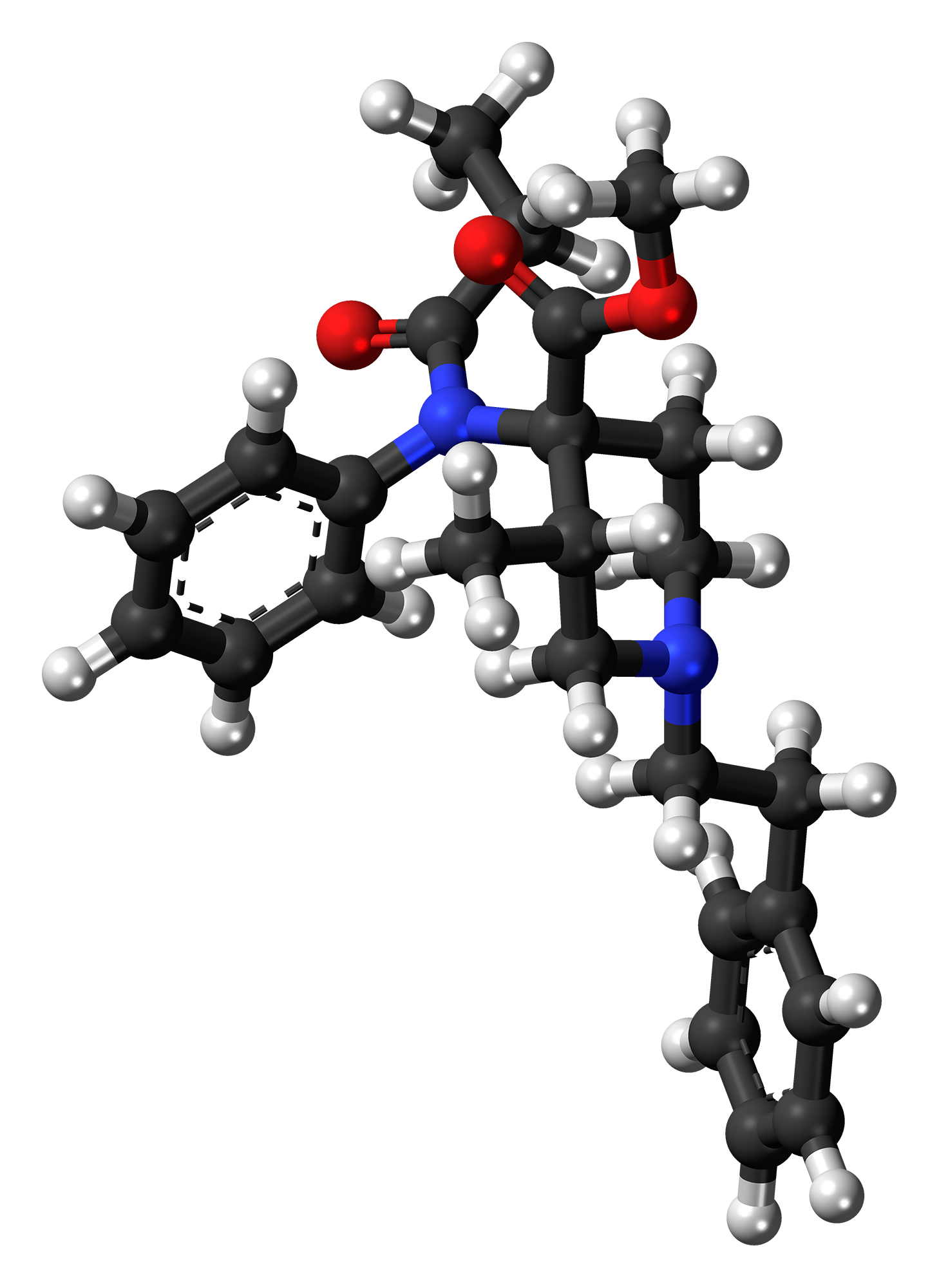

Clinical data
- Other names: Lofentanil; methyl (3S,4R)-1-(2-phenylethyl)-4 -(phenyl-propanoylamino)-3-methylpiperidine-4-carboxylate
- ATC code: none

Legal status
- Legal status: DE: Anlage I (Authorized scientific use only); UK: Class A; US: Schedule II (fentanyl analogue; Federal Analogue Act)

Identifiers
- IUPAC name: methyl (3S,4R)-3-methyl-1-(2-phenylethyl)-4-[phenyl(propionyl)amino]piperidine-4-carboxylate
- CAS Number: 61380-40-3
- PubChem CID: 10070040
- DrugBank: DB09174
- ChemSpider: 8245580
- UNII: 7H7YQ564XV
- ChEMBL: ChEMBL28198

Chemical and physical data
- Formula: C_{25}H_{32}N_{2}O_{3}
- Molar mass: 408.542 g·mol^{−1}
- 3D model (JSmol): Interactive image
- SMILES: O=(CC)N(c1ccccc1)[C@@]2(C(OC)=O)CCN(C[C@H]2C)CCc3ccccc3
- InChI: InChI=1S/C25H32N2O3/c1-4-23(28)27(22-13-9-6-10-14-22)25(24(29)30-3)16-18-26(19-20(25)2)17-15-21-11-7-5-8-12-21/h5-14,20H,4,15-19H2,1-3H3/t20-,25+/m1/s1; Key:IMYHGORQCPYVBZ-NLFFAJNJSA-N

Lofentanil or lofentanyl is one of the most potent opioid analgesics known and is an analogue of fentanyl, which was developed in 1960. It is most similar to the highly potent opioid carfentanil (4-carbomethoxyfentanyl), only slightly more potent. Lofentanil can be described as 3-methylcarfentanil, or 3-methyl-4-carbomethoxyfentanyl. While 3-methylfentanyl is considerably more potent than fentanyl itself, lofentanil is only slightly stronger than carfentanil. This suggests that substitution at both the 3 and 4 positions of the piperidine ring introduces steric hindrance which prevents μ-opioid affinity from increasing much further. As with other 3-substituted fentanyl derivatives such as ohmefentanyl, the stereoisomerism of lofentanil is very important, with some stereoisomers being much more potent than others.

Lofentanil is very similar to carfentanil in effects, but has a longer duration of action. This makes it unsuitable for most practical applications, with carfentanil being the preferred agent for tranquilizing large animals, and short-acting derivatives such as sufentanil or remifentanil being preferred for medical use in human surgical procedures. The long duration and high lipophilicity of lofentanil has been suggested as an advantage for certain types of analgesia, but the main application for lofentanil at the present time is research into opioid receptors.

In addition to acting on the μ-opioid receptor, lofentanil has also been found to act as a full agonist of the κ-opioid receptor (K_{i} = 8.2 nM; EC_{50} = 153 nM; E_{max} = 100%).

== See also ==
- Opioid potency comparison
