= 14-Methoxymetopon =

Chemical compound

Identifiers
- IUPAC name: 3-Hydroxy-14-methoxy-5,17-dimethyl-7,8-dihydro-4,5α-epoxy-morphinan-6-one
- CAS Number: 131575-03-6
- PubChem CID: 5486940
- ChemSpider: 4589140
- ChEMBL: ChEMBL326684
- CompTox Dashboard (EPA): DTXSID50927273

Chemical and physical data
- Formula: C_{19}H_{23}NO_{4}
- Molar mass: 329.396 g·mol^{−1}
- 3D model (JSmol): Interactive image
- SMILES: C[C@]12C(=O)CC[C@@]3([C@]14CCN([C@@H]3CC5=C4C(=C(C=C5)O)O2)C)OC
- InChI: InChI=1S/C19H23NO4/c1-17-14(22)6-7-19(23-3)13-10-11-4-5-12(21)16(24-17)15(11)18(17,19)8-9-20(13)2/h4-5,13,21H,6-10H2,1-3H3/t13-,17+,18+,19-/m1/s1; Key:DENICFHULARDRG-WEZQJLTASA-N

14-Methoxymetopon is an experimental opioid drug developed by a team led by Professor Helmut Schmidhammer at the University of Innsbruck in the mid-1990s. It is a derivative of metopon in which a methoxy group has been inserted at the 14-position. It is a highly potent analgesic drug that is around 500 times stronger than morphine when administered systemically; however, when given spinally or supraspinally, it exhibits analgesic activity up to a million fold greater than morphine. It binds strongly to the μ-opioid receptor and activates it to a greater extent than most similar opioid drugs. This produces an unusual pharmacological profile, and although 14-methoxymetopon acts as a potent μ-opioid full agonist in regard to some effects such as analgesia, a ceiling effect is seen on other effects such as constipation and respiratory depression which is believed to involve interaction with the κ-opioid receptor.

== See also ==
- 14-Methoxydihydromorphinone
