= Ohmefentanyl =

Opioid analgesic

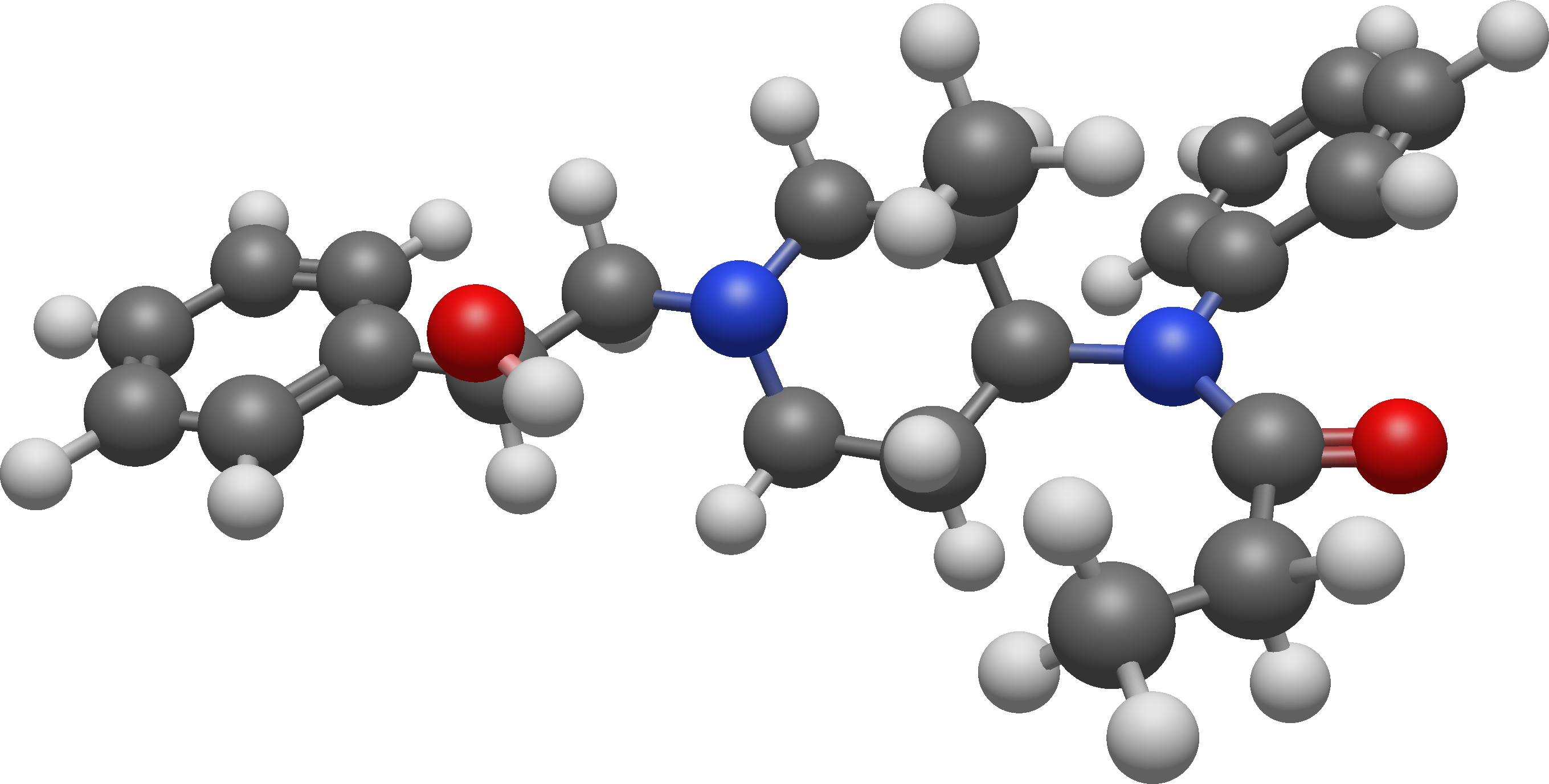

Clinical data
- ATC code: none

Legal status
- Legal status: BR: Class F1 (Prohibited narcotics); CA: Schedule I; DE: Anlage I (Authorized scientific use only); UK: Class A; US: Schedule I; UN: Psychotropic Schedule I

Identifiers
- IUPAC name: N-[1-(2-hydroxy-2-phenylethyl)-3-methylpiperidin-4-yl]-N-phenylpropanamide
- CAS Number: 78995-14-9
- PubChem CID: 62279
- DrugBank: DB01570
- ChemSpider: 56080
- UNII: Y8263089ZX
- KEGG: C22750
- ChEBI: CHEBI:194294
- ChEMBL: ChEMBL333410
- CompTox Dashboard (EPA): DTXSID50868495

Chemical and physical data
- Formula: C_{23}H_{30}N_{2}O_{2}
- Molar mass: 366.505 g·mol^{−1}
- 3D model (JSmol): Interactive image
- SMILES: CCC(=O)N(c1ccccc1)C2CCN(CC2C)CC(O)c3ccccc3
- InChI: InChI=1S/C23H30N2O2/c1-3-23(27)25(20-12-8-5-9-13-20)21-14-15-24(16-18(21)2)17-22(26)19-10-6-4-7-11-19/h4-13,18,21-22,26H,3,14-17H2,1-2H3; Key:FRPRNNRJTCONEC-UHFFFAOYSA-N

Ohmefentanyl (also known as β-hydroxy-3-methylfentanyl, OMF and RTI-4614-4) is an extremely potent opioid analgesic drug which selectively binds to the μ-opioid receptor.

There are eight possible stereoisomers of ohmefentanyl. These stereoisomers are among the most potent μ-opioid receptor agonists known, comparable to super-potent opioids such as carfentanil and etorphine which are only legally used for tranquilizing large animals such as elephants in veterinary medicine. In mouse studies, the most active stereoisomer, 3R,4S,βS-ohmefentanyl, was 28 times more powerful as a painkiller than fentanyl, the chemical from which it is derived, and 6300 times more powerful than morphine. Ohmefentanyl has three stereogenic centers and eight stereoisomers, which are named F9201–F9208. Researchers are studying the different pharmaceutical properties of these isomers.

The 4″-fluoro analogue (i.e., substituted on the phenethyl ring) of the 3R,4S,βS isomer of ohmefentanyl is one of the most potent opioid agonists yet discovered, possessing an analgesic potency approximately 18,000 times that of morphine. Other analogues with potency higher than that of ohmefentanyl itself include the 2′-fluoro derivative (i.e., substituted on the aniline phenyl ring), and derivatives where the N-propionyl group was replaced by N-methoxyacetyl or 2-furamide groups, or a carboethoxy group is added to the 4-position of the piperidine ring. The latter is listed as being up to 30,000 times more potent than morphine.

Side effects of fentanyl analogues are similar to those of fentanyl itself, which include itching, nausea and potentially serious respiratory depression, which can be life-threatening. Illicitly used fentanyl analogues have killed hundreds of people throughout Europe and the former Soviet republics since the most recent resurgence in use began in Estonia in the early 2000s, and novel derivatives continue to appear.

The chemical structure of fentanyl has been used as a basis in modern chemistry for the discovery and nomenclature of many new fentanyl analogues, sometimes called 'fentalogues'.

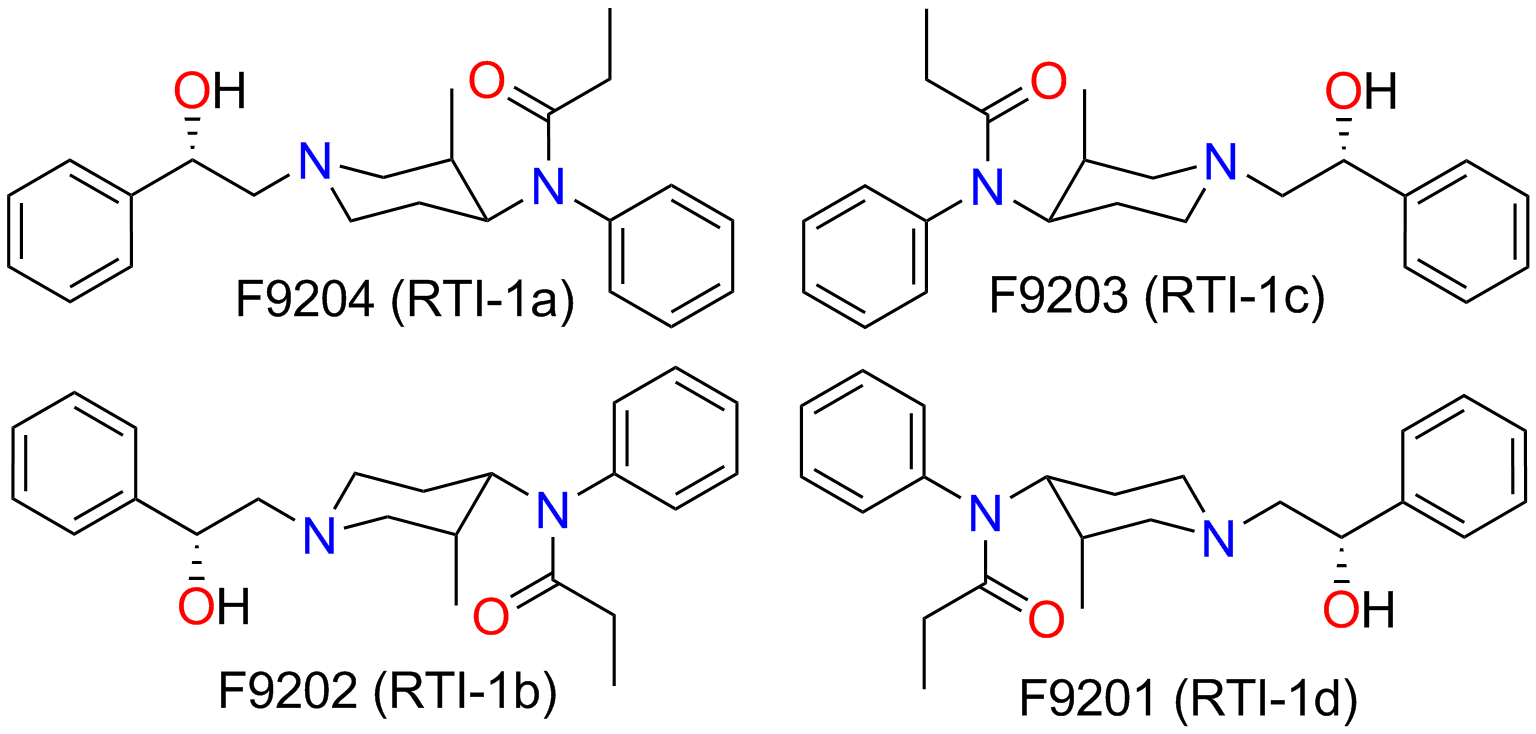
Molecular structure of four of the eight ohmefentanyl isomers

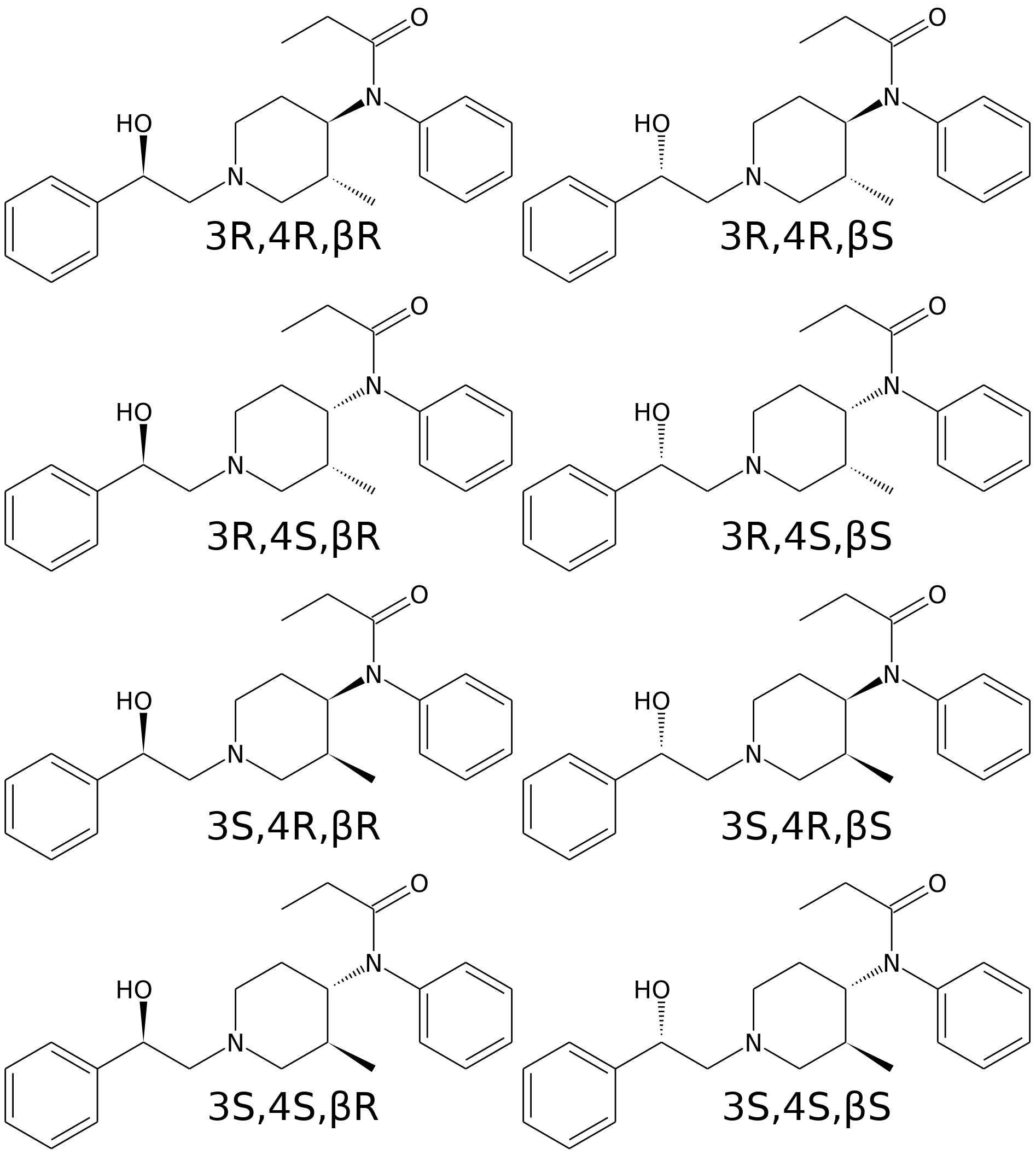
Molecular structure of all of the eight ohmefentanyl isomers

== Synthesis ==
Ohmefentanyl Synthetic Pathway

== See also ==
- Opioid
- Fentanyl
- 3-Methylfentanyl
- Carfentanil
- Ohmecarfentanil
- Opioid potency comparison
