= 7-PET =

Opioid analgesic drug

Identifiers
- IUPAC name: (2R)-2-((4R,7S,7aR,12bS,14R)-7,9-dimethoxy-3-methyl-1,2,3,4,7,7a-hexahydro-7,4a-ethano-4,12-methanobenzofuro[3,2-e]isoquinolin-14-yl)-4-phenylbutan-2-ol
- CAS Number: 13965-63-4
- PubChem CID: 203125
- ChemSpider: 21106246
- UNII: EA1GYF2V3I
- CompTox Dashboard (EPA): DTXSID30912329

Chemical and physical data
- Formula: C_{31}H_{39}NO_{4}
- Molar mass: 489.656 g·mol^{−1}
- 3D model (JSmol): Interactive image
- SMILES: O[C@](C)(CCc1ccccc1)[C@H]7CC64\C=C/[C@@]7(OC)[C@@H]5Oc2c3c(ccc2OC)C[C@H]6N(CC[C@@]345)C
- InChI: InChI=1S/C31H39NO4/c1-28(33,13-12-20-8-6-5-7-9-20)23-19-29-14-15-31(23,35-4)27-30(29)16-17-32(2)24(29)18-21-10-11-22(34-3)26(36-27)25(21)30/h5-11,23-24,27,33H,12-19H2,1-4H3/t23?,24-,27?,28?,29-,30+,31-/m1/s1; Key:CSZMZMPPNJFGRW-TZBHJBKBSA-N

7-PET is an opioid analgesic drug that has 300 times the potency of morphine by weight. It was discovered by K.W. Bentley and is related to the more well known oripavine derivative etorphine, which is used as a veterinary painkiller and anesthetic medication for the sedation of large animals such as elephants, giraffes, and rhinos. 7-PET itself has a 3-O-methyl ether which reduces potency, but the 3-OH derivative is around 2200 times more potent than morphine, almost the same potency as etorphine as a μ agonist, and unexpectedly the 3-hydrogen compound is also around the same potency of 2000 times morphine.

Unlike etorphine, 7-PET is not controlled under the UN drug conventions, but it might still be considered to be a controlled substance analogue of etorphine on the grounds of its related chemical structure in some jurisdictions such as the United States, Canada, Australia, and New Zealand.

== See also ==
- 14-Cinnamoyloxycodeinone
- 14-Phenylpropoxymetopon
- BU72
- N-Phenethylnormorphine
- N-Phenethyl-14-ethoxymetopon
- Phenomorphan
- RAM-378
- Ro4-1539
