= 14-Phenylpropoxymetopon =

Chemical compound

Clinical data
- Other names: 14-Phenylpropoxymetopon, PPOM

Identifiers
- IUPAC name: 3-Hydroxy-14-(3-phenylpropoxy)-5-methyl-7,8-dihydro-4,5α-epoxy-17-methylmorphinan-6-one
- PubChem CID: 10238204
- ChemSpider: 8413692
- ChEMBL: ChEMBL1672083
- CompTox Dashboard (EPA): DTXSID101018231

Chemical and physical data
- Formula: C_{27}H_{31}NO_{4}
- Molar mass: 433.548 g·mol^{−1}
- 3D model (JSmol): Interactive image
- SMILES: C[C@]12C(=O)CC[C@@]3([C@]14CCN([C@@H]3CC5=C4C(=C(C=C5)O)O2)C)OCCCC6=CC=CC=C6
- InChI: InChI=1S/C27H31NO4/c1-25-22(30)12-13-27(31-16-6-9-18-7-4-3-5-8-18)21-17-19-10-11-20(29)24(32-25)23(19)26(25,27)14-15-28(21)2/h3-5,7-8,10-11,21,29H,6,9,12-17H2,1-2H3/t21-,25+,26+,27-/m1/s1; Key:YLXOHYYZBORDAJ-NVSKSXHLSA-N

14-Phenylpropoxymetopon (PPOM) is an opioid analogue that is a derivative of metopon which has been substituted with a γ-phenylpropoxy group at the 14-position. PPOM is a highly potent analgesic drug several thousand times stronger than morphine, with an even higher in vivo potency than etorphine. The 14-phenylpropoxy substitution appears to confer potent μ-opioid agonist activity, even when combined with substitutions such as N-cyclopropyl or N-allyl, which normally result in μ-opioid antagonist compounds.

It has never been used in humans, but would be expected to produce effects similar to those of other potent opioid agonists, including strong analgesia, sedation, euphoria, constipation, itching and respiratory depression which could be harmful or fatal. Tolerance and dependence would be expected to develop rapidly based on the potency of the drug, as it is of a similar strength to the most potent of fentanyl analogues and so would most likely cause pronounced tachyphylaxis following repeated dosing.

== See also ==
- 14-Cinnamoyloxycodeinone
- 7-PET
- N-Phenethylnormorphine
- N-Phenethyl-14-ethoxymetopon
- Phenomorphan
- RAM-378
- Ro4-1539
