= Protonitazepyne =

Chemical compound

Identifiers
- IUPAC name: 5-nitro-2-(4-propoxybenzyl)-1-(2-(pyrrolidin-1-yl)ethyl)-1H-benzo[d]imidazole
- CAS Number: 3038401-95-2
- PubChem CID: 168322728
- ChemSpider: 115005635
- UNII: T3LB6K85C7

Chemical and physical data
- Formula: C_{23}H_{28}N_{4}O_{3}
- Molar mass: 408.502 g·mol^{−1}
- 3D model (JSmol): Interactive image
- SMILES: CCCOC1=CC=C(C=C1)CC2=NC3=C(N2CCN4CCCC4)C=CC(=C3)[N+](=O)[O-]
- InChI: InChI=1S/C23H28N4O3/c1-2-15-30-20-8-5-18(6-9-20)16-23-24-21-17-19(27(28)29)7-10-22(21)26(23)14-13-25-11-3-4-12-25/h5-10,17H,2-4,11-16H2,1H3; Key:KCRWXNIIXGBPID-UHFFFAOYSA-N

Protonitazepyne (N-pyrrolidino protonitazene) is a benzimidazole derivative with opioid effects, which has been sold as a designer drug over the internet, first being mentioned in mid 2022 and definitively identified in drug seizures in Canada in early 2023 and Ireland in late 2023. It has since been identified by CanTEST in May 2024 in Australia and in late 2025 in Brazil by the State University of Campinas poison control center.

It is an analogue of protonitazene where the N,N-diethyl group has been substituted for pyrrolidine group. While formal studies into its pharmacology have yet to be carried out, it has an in vitro potency approximately 350x times that of morphine.

== See also ==
- Isotonitazene
- Isotonitazepyne
- Metonitazene
- Etomethazene
- Etonitazepipne
- List of benzimidazole opioids
