= Metopon =

Analgesic drug

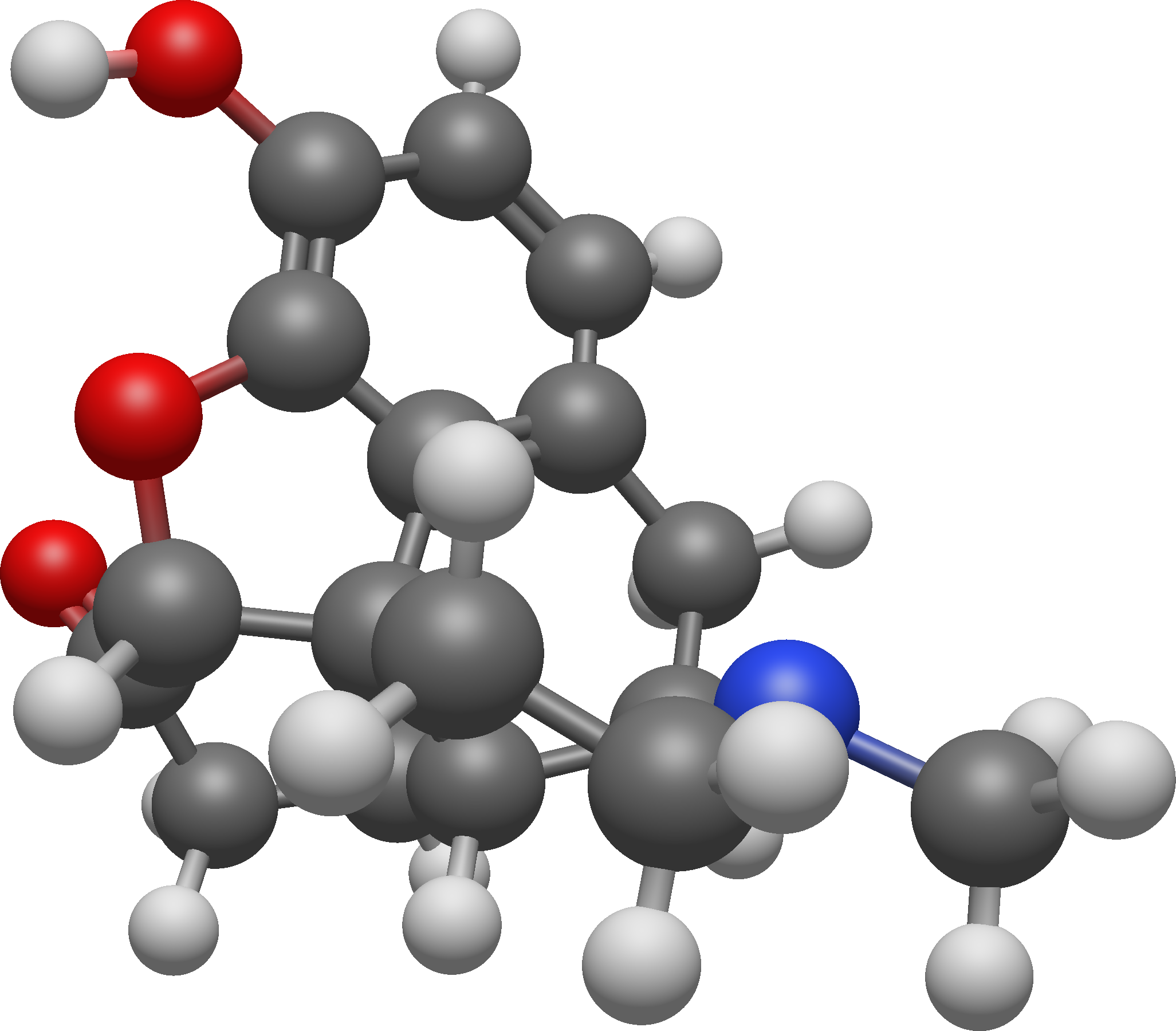

Clinical data
- ATC code: none

Legal status
- Legal status: AU: S9 (Prohibited substance); BR: Class A1 (Narcotic drugs); CA: Schedule I; DE: Anlage I (Authorized scientific use only); US: Schedule II

Identifiers
- IUPAC name: 5β-methyl-7,8-dihydromorphin-6-one
- CAS Number: 143-52-2
- PubChem CID: 5359353
- ChemSpider: 4514264
- UNII: 94XZ1CC69D
- KEGG: D12690
- CompTox Dashboard (EPA): DTXSID20162275

Chemical and physical data
- Formula: C_{18}H_{21}NO_{3}
- Molar mass: 299.370 g·mol^{−1}
- 3D model (JSmol): Interactive image
- SMILES: O=C4[C@@]5(Oc1c2c(ccc1O)C[C@H]3N(CC[C@]25[C@H]3CC4)C)C
- InChI: InChI=1S/C18H21NO3/c1-17-14(21)6-4-11-12-9-10-3-5-13(20)16(22-17)15(10)18(11,17)7-8-19(12)2/h3,5,11-12,20H,4,6-9H2,1-2H3/t11-,12+,17-,18-/m0/s1; Key:NPZXCTIHHUUEEJ-CMKMFDCUSA-N

Metopon (5-methylhydromorphone, CAS number 124-92-5) is an opioid analogue that is a methylated derivative of hydromorphone which was invented in 1929 as an analgesic.

Metopon is sometimes used in medicine. Although longer acting than hydromorphone, metopon is less potent and its oral bioavailability is fairly low. Generally, metopon has few advantages to distinguish it from other, more commonly used opioid analgesics, although it does have a slightly lower tendency to produce nausea and respiratory depression compared to morphine.

In Canada, as of 1948, the hydrochloride of metopon (free base conversion ratio 0.891, molecular weight 335.8) was available only for oral administration for malignant pain and for maintenance of those habituated to morphine; the only dosage form available was singly scored 8 mg tablets. It was manufactured by Parke, Davis, & Co., and was only for sale to doctors and hospitals. Parke, Davis & Co. did not sell metopon to pharmacies. It is unknown whether metopon tablets are still manufactured and sold in Canada.

Metopon tablets, ampoules, and suppositories are available in Switzerland, Austria, Germany, and other countries in Continental Europe and the drug is used in Patient Controlled Analgesia pumps for severe chronic pain in particular. Metopon is listed under Schedule II of the US Controlled Substances Act 1970, meaning it has an accepted medical use, but at this time it is not produced commercially and is seen only in laboratory research. It did see some use in medicine — oncology in particular — in the US in the 1950s. Currently metopon, which has a DEA ACSCN of 9260, does not have an annual manufacturing quota listed in the Federal Register and the bulk of the research on the drug at this time is taking place in Germany, Switzerland, and Austria.

== Synthesis ==
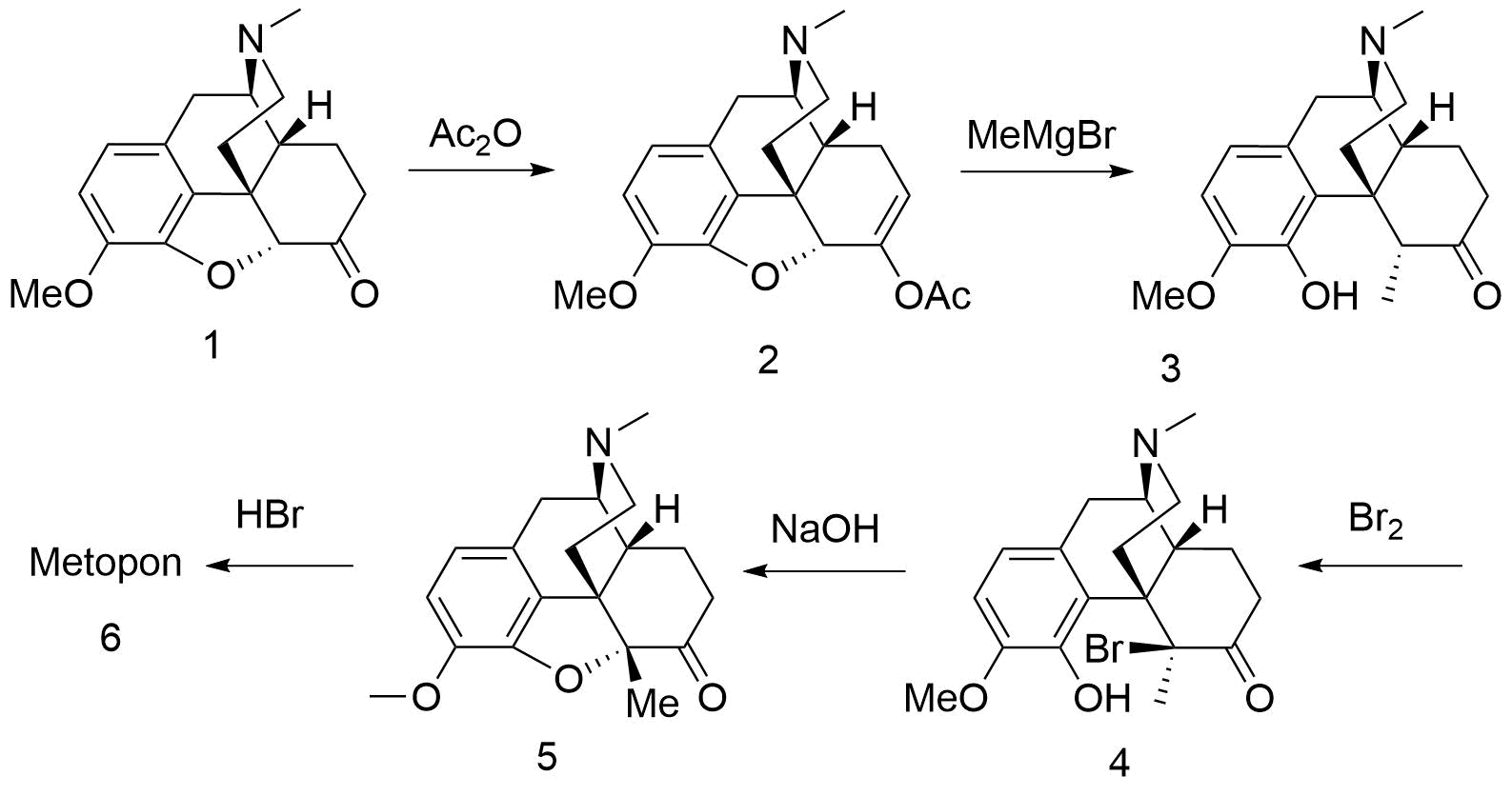
Metopon synthesis:

== See also ==
- 14-Methoxymetopon
- 14-Ethoxymetopon
- 14-Phenylpropoxymetopon
- N-Phenethyl-14-ethoxymetopon
