= 14-Cinnamoyloxycodeinone =

Opioid analgesic drug

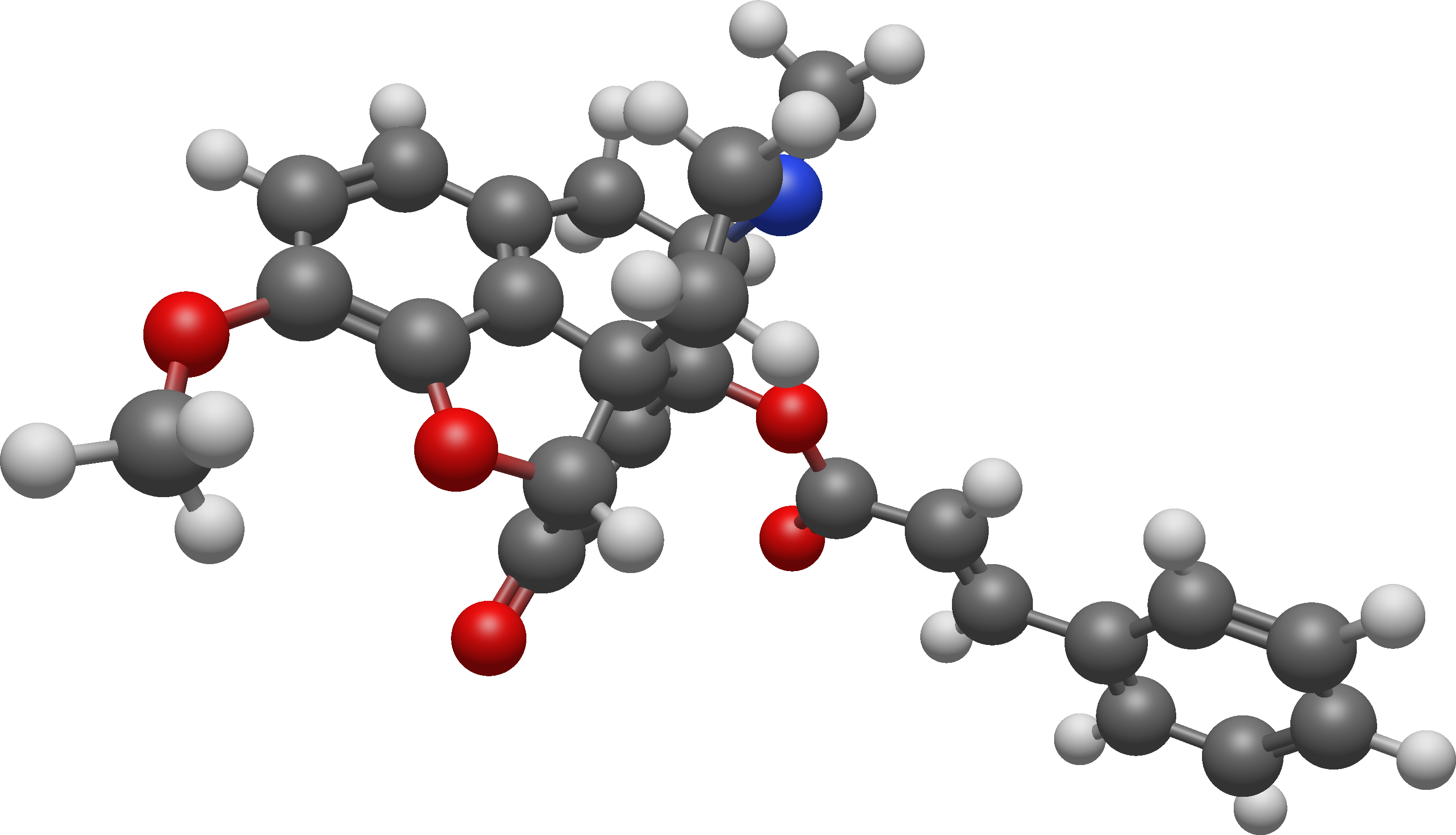

Identifiers
- IUPAC name: 7,8-didehydro-4,5α-epoxy-14-cinnamoyl-3-methoxy-17-methylmorphinan-6-one
- CAS Number: 751-01-9
- PubChem CID: 6438241
- ChemSpider: 4942728
- UNII: M9VES83RLJ
- CompTox Dashboard (EPA): DTXSID401018230

Chemical and physical data
- Formula: C_{27}H_{25}NO_{5}
- Molar mass: 443.499 g·mol^{−1}
- 3D model (JSmol): Interactive image
- SMILES: CN1CC[C@]23[C@@H]4C(=O)C=C[C@]2([C@H]1CC5=C3C(=C(C=C5)OC)O4)OC(=O)/C=C/C6=CC=CC=C6
- InChI: InChI=1S/C27H25NO5/c1-28-15-14-26-23-18-9-10-20(31-2)24(23)32-25(26)19(29)12-13-27(26,21(28)16-18)33-22(30)11-8-17-6-4-3-5-7-17/h3-13,21,25H,14-16H2,1-2H3/b11-8+/t21-,25+,26+,27-/m1/s1; Key:BWZTYCFJIMYOHI-JKGZCERPSA-N

14-Cinnamoyloxycodeinone is the most potent example in a series of opiate analgesic drugs discovered in the 1960s, with over 100 times the potency of morphine. It is a derivative of hydroxycodeinone, being the 14-cinnamate ester. In another paper, Buckett assigns the potency as 177 with a range (depending on animal and test) of 101–310×. It may be of interest to researchers that the allyl group in this compound and in allylprodine overlay very closely.

== See also ==
- 14-Phenylpropoxymetopon
- 7-PET
- Methocinnamox
- N-Phenethylnormorphine
- N-Phenethyl-14-ethoxymetopon
- Phenomorphan
- RAM-378
- Ro4-1539
