= Phenomorphan =

Chemical compound

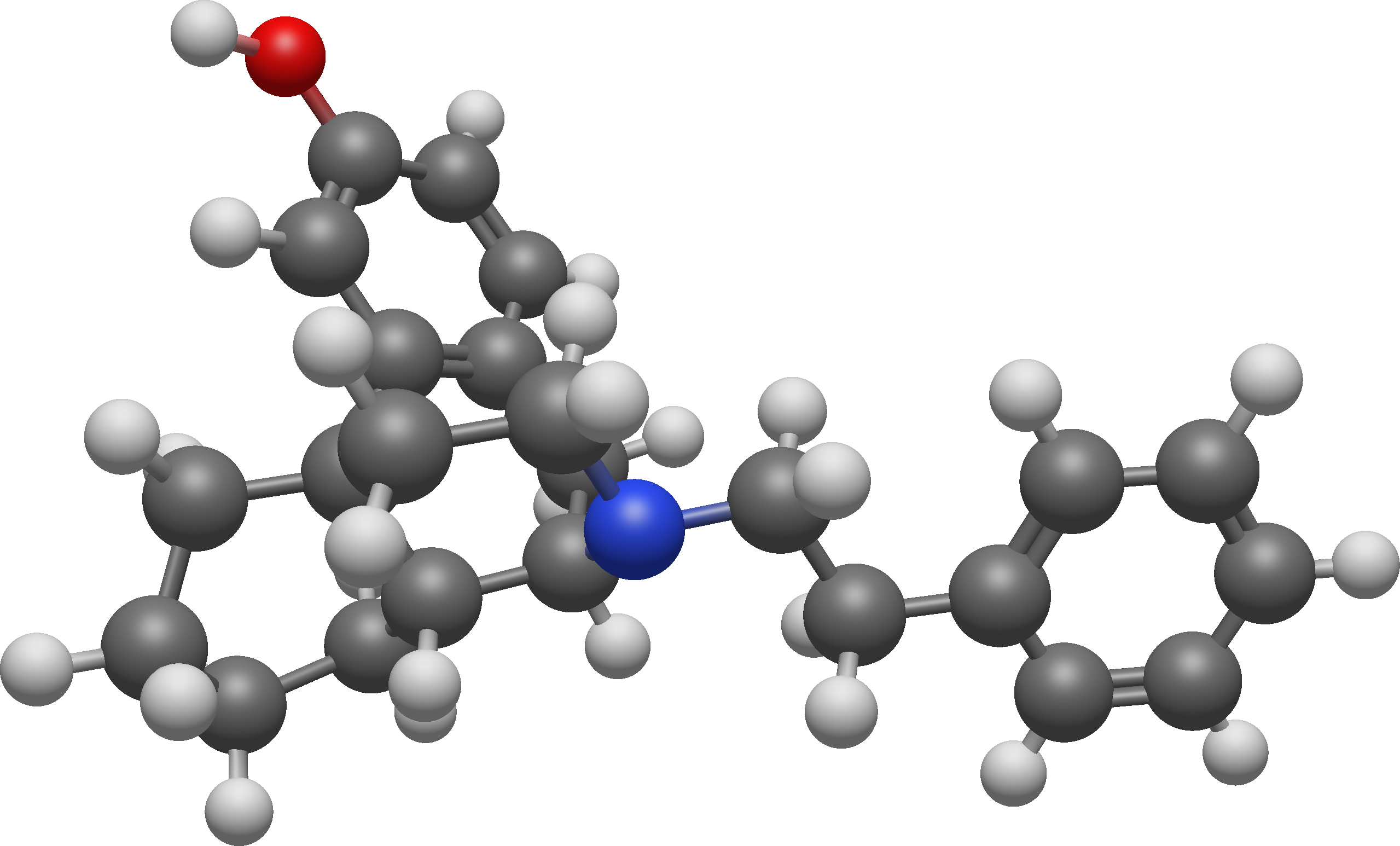

Clinical data
- Other names: (-)-3-hydroxy- N- (2-phenylethyl) morphinan
- ATC code: none

Legal status
- Legal status: AU: S9 (Prohibited substance); BR: Class A1 (Narcotic drugs); CA: Schedule I; DE: Anlage I (Authorized scientific use only); UK: Class A; US: Schedule I

Identifiers
- IUPAC name: 17-(2-Phenylethyl)morphinan-3-ol
- CAS Number: 468-07-5
- PubChem CID: 5362458
- ChemSpider: 16735962
- UNII: 26HXE4B73P
- KEGG: D12688
- CompTox Dashboard (EPA): DTXSID70878657
- ECHA InfoCard: 100.006.732

Chemical and physical data
- Formula: C_{24}H_{29}NO
- Molar mass: 347.502 g·mol^{−1}
- 3D model (JSmol): Interactive image
- SMILES: Oc3ccc4C[C@H]1N(CC[C@@]2(CCCC[C@@H]12)c4c3)CCc5ccccc5
- InChI: InChI=1S/C24H29NO/c26-20-10-9-19-16-23-21-8-4-5-12-24(21,22(19)17-20)13-15-25(23)14-11-18-6-2-1-3-7-18/h1-3,6-7,9-10,17,21,23,26H,4-5,8,11-16H2/t21-,23+,24+/m0/s1; Key:CFBQYWXPZVQQTN-QPTUXGOLSA-N

Phenomorphan is an opioid analgesic. It is not currently used in medicine, but has similar side-effects to other opiates, which include itching, nausea and respiratory depression.

Phenomorphan is a highly potent drug due to the N-phenethyl group, which boosts affinity to the μ-opioid receptor, and so phenomorphan is around 10x more potent than levorphanol, which is itself 6-8x the potency of morphine. Other analogues where the N-(2-phenylethyl) group has been replaced by other aromatic rings are even more potent, with the N-(2-(2-furyl)ethyl) and the N-(2-(2-thienyl)ethyl) analogues being 60x and 45x stronger than levorphanol, respectively.

== See also ==
- 14-Cinnamoyloxycodeinone
- 14-Phenylpropoxymetopon
- 7-PET
- N-Phenethylnormorphine
- N-Phenethylnordesomorphine
- N-Phenethyl-14-ethoxymetopon
- RAM-378
- Ro4-1539
