= N-Phenethyl-14-ethoxymetopon =

Opioid analgesic drug

Identifiers
- IUPAC name: (5α)-14-Ethoxy-3-hydroxy-5-methyl-17-(2-phenylethyl)-4,5-epoxymorphinan-6-one
- PubChem CID: 11049533
- ChemSpider: 9224700
- ChEMBL: ChEMBL607406
- CompTox Dashboard (EPA): DTXSID201018234

Chemical and physical data
- Formula: C_{27}H_{31}NO_{4}
- Molar mass: 433.548 g·mol^{−1}
- 3D model (JSmol): Interactive image
- SMILES: CCO[C@@]12CCC(=O)[C@]3([C@@]14CCN([C@@H]2CC5=C4C(=C(C=C5)O)O3)CCC6=CC=CC=C6)C
- InChI: InChI=1S/C27H31NO4/c1-3-31-27-13-11-22(30)25(2)26(27)14-16-28(15-12-18-7-5-4-6-8-18)21(27)17-19-9-10-20(29)24(32-25)23(19)26/h4-10,21,29H,3,11-17H2,1-2H3/t21-,25+,26+,27-/m1/s1; Key:YNNFSTLAUJEYHI-NVSKSXHLSA-N

N-Phenethyl-14-ethoxymetopon is a drug that is a derivative of metopon. It is a potent analgesic, around 60 times stronger than morphine and produces significantly less constipation.

N-Phenethyl-14-ethoxymetopon acts as an agonist at both μ- and δ-opioid receptors, with a K_{i} of 0.16 nM at μ and 3.14 nM at δ.

== See also ==
- 14-Cinnamoyloxycodeinone
- 14-Phenylpropoxymetopon
- 7-PET
- MR-2096
- N-Phenethylnormorphine
- Phenomorphan
- RAM-378
- Ro4-1539
