= Ro4-1539 =

Chemical compound

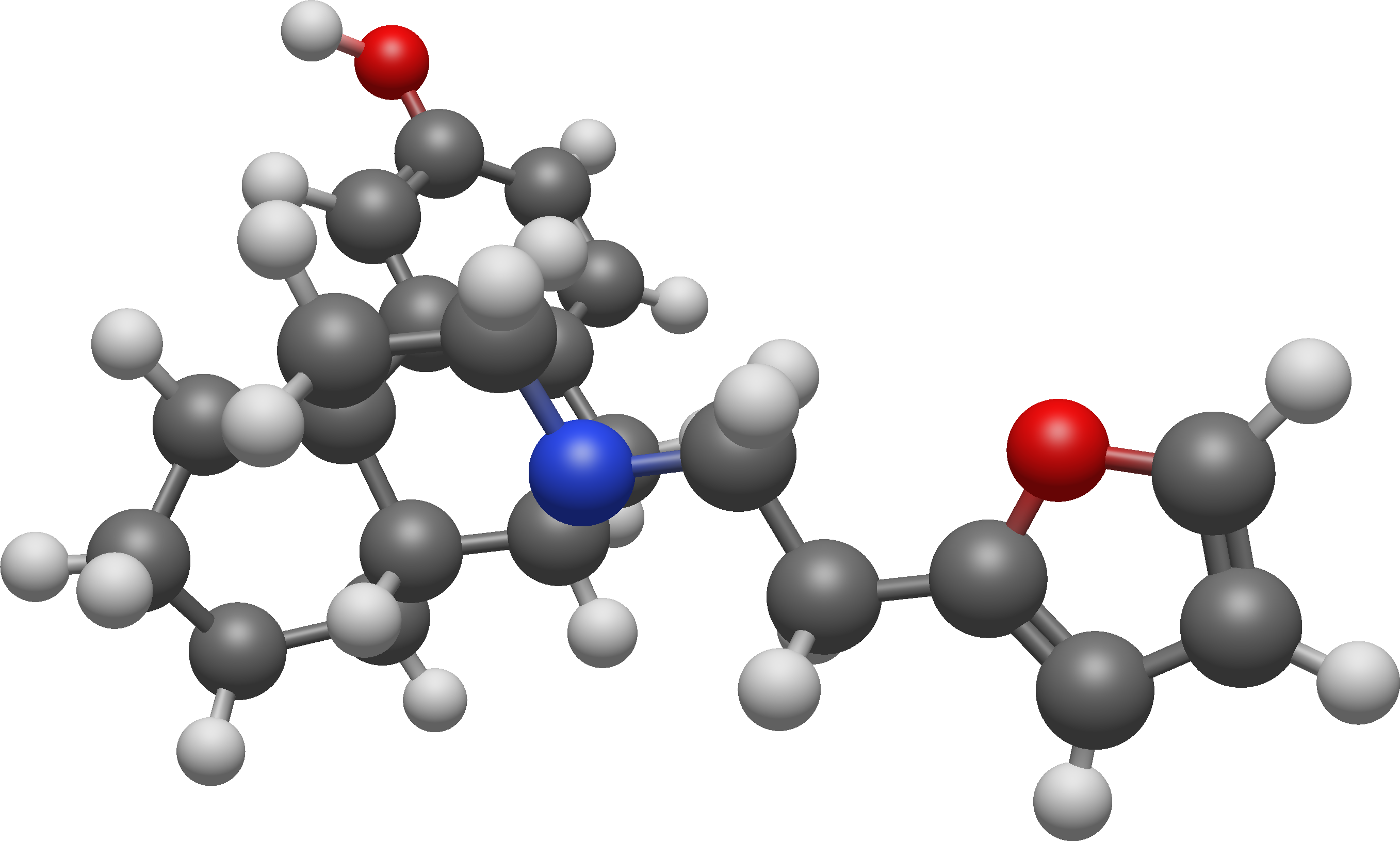

Legal status
- Legal status: In general: legal

Pharmacokinetic data
- Bioavailability: 70% oral IV 100%
- Elimination half-life: 11-16h

Identifiers
- IUPAC name: 17-(2-(Furan-2-yl)ethyl)-3-hydroxymorphinan
- CAS Number: 27767-85-7
- PubChem CID: 20834001
- CompTox Dashboard (EPA): DTXSID20950452

Chemical and physical data
- Formula: C_{22}H_{27}NO_{2}
- Molar mass: 337.463 g·mol^{−1}
- 3D model (JSmol): Interactive image
- SMILES: C3CCCC1C35c2cc(O)ccc2CC1N(CC5)CCc4ccco4

Ro4-1539 (furethylnorlevorphanol) is an opioid analgesic drug from the morphinan series that was discovered by the pharmaceutical company Hoffmann–La Roche in the 1950s. It acts as a potent μ-opioid agonist, and was found to be around 30-60 times more potent than the related drug levorphanol in animal experiments. Although it has high potency, long duration, and good therapeutic index (1100 in animal studies), Ro4-1539 had no particular clinical advantages over other available opioid drugs, and was never commercially marketed.

Ro4-1539 has never formally undergone clinical trials in humans, but based on its effects in animals it would be expected to produce effects similar to those of other potent opioid agonists, including strong analgesia, sedation, euphoria, constipation, itching, tachyphylaxis and respiratory depression, which could be harmful or fatal. Due to potential κ-opioid agonism, it may be somewhat dysphoric and cause dissociation.

== See also ==
- 14-Cinnamoyloxycodeinone
- 14-Phenylpropoxymetopon
- 7-PET
- N-Phenethylnormorphine
- N-Phenethyl-14-ethoxymetopon
- Phenomorphan
- RAM-378
