= List of Schedule I controlled substances (U.S.) =

This is the list of Schedule I controlled substances in the United States as defined by the Controlled Substances Act. The following findings are required for substances to be placed in this schedule:

1. The drug or other substance has a high potential for abuse.
2. The drug or other substance has no current (Note: The use of the term "currently" in Wikipedia is deprecated per MOS:RELTIME, however its presence here is a direct quotation of the referenced Act.) accepted medical use in treatment in the United States.
3. There is a lack of accepted safety for use of the drug or other substance under medical supervision.

The complete list of Schedule I substances is as follows. The Administrative Controlled Substances Code Number for each substance is included.

== Opioids ==
ACSCN	Drug
9815	Acetyl-alpha-methylfentanyl
9601	Acetylmethadol (Note: This substance was expressly scheduled by the Controlled Substances Act on October 27, 1970. The 1974 Federal Register ruling (by Administrator John R. Bartels, Jr.) merely organized its listing in the Code of Federal Regulations.)
9821	Acetylfentanyl
9811	Acryl fentanyl
9551	AH-7921
9602	Allylprodine
9603	Alphacetylmethadol (except levo-alphacetylmethadol also known as levo-alpha-acetylmethadol, levomethadyl acetate, or LAAM)
9604	Alphameprodine
9605	Alphamethadol
9814	Alpha-methylfentanyl
9832	Alpha-methylthiofentanyl
9606	Benzethidine
9607	Betacetylmethadol
9830	Beta-hydroxyfentanyl
9831	Beta-hydroxy-3-methylfentanyl
9836	Beta-hydroxythiofentanyl
9608	Betameprodine
9609	Betamethadol
9856	Beta-methylfentanyl
9842	Beta-phenylfentanyl
9611	Betaprodine
9098	Brorphine
9822	Butyryl Fentanyl
9612	Clonitazene
9844	Crotonylfentanyl
9847	Cyclopentyl fentanyl
9845	Cyclopropyl fentanyl
9613	Dextromoramide
9615	Diampromide
9616	Diethylthiambutene
9168	Difenoxin
9617	Dimenoxadol
9618	Dimepheptanol
9619	Dimethylthiambutene
9621	Dioxaphetyl butyrate
9622	Dipipanone
9623	Ethylmethylthiambutene
9624	Etonitazene
9625	Etoxeridine
9851	Fentanyl carbamate
9824	4-Fluoroisobutyryl fentanyl
9855	2′-Fluoro ortho-fluorofentanyl
9834	Furanyl fentanyl
9626	Furethidine
9627	Hydroxypethidine
9827	Isobutrylfentanyl
9614	Isotonitazene
9628	Ketobemidone
9629	Levomoramide
9631	Levophenacylmorphan
9825	Methoxyacetyl fentanyl
9819	4′-Methyl acetyl fentanyl
9664	2-Methyl AP-237
9813	3-Methylfentanyl
9833	3-methylthiofentanyl
9757	Metonitazene
9632	Morpheridine
9661	MPPP
9560	MT-45
9633	Noracymethadol
9634	Norlevorphanol
9635	Normethadone
9636	Norpipanone
9760	N-Desethyl Isotonitazene
9761	N-Piperidinyl Etonitazene
9762	N-Pyrrolidino Metonitazene
9763	N-Pyrrolidino Protonitazene
9838	Ocfentanil
9852	ortho-Fluoroacryl fentanyl
9846	ortho-Fluorobutyryl fentanyl
9816	ortho-Fluorofentanyl
9853	ortho-Fluoroisobutyryl fentanyl
9848	ortho-Methyl acetylfentanyl
9820	ortho-Methyl methoxyacetyl fentanyl
9826	para-Chloroisobutyryl fentanyl
9823	para-Fluorobutyryl fentanyl
9812	Para-fluorofentanyl
9854	para-Fluoro furanyl fentanyl
9837	para-Methoxybutyryl fentanyl
9817	para-Methylfentanyl
9663	PEPAP
9637	Phenadoxone
9638	Phenampromide
9647	Phenomorphan
9641	Phenoperidine
9841	Benzoylfentanyl
9642	Piritramide
9643	Proheptazine
9644	Properidine
9649	Propiram
9645	Racemoramide
9843	Tetrahydrofuranyl fentanyl
9835	Thiofentanyl
9839	Thiofuranyl fentanyl
9750	Tilidine
9646	Trimeperidine
9547	U-47700
9840	Valerylfentanyl
9873	Zipeprol

== Opium derivatives ==
ACSCN	Drug
9319	Acetorphine
9051	Acetyldihydrocodeine
9052	Benzylmorphine
9070	Codeine methylbromide
9053	Codeine-N-Oxide
9054	Cyprenorphine
9055	Desomorphine
9145	Dihydromorphine
9335	Drotebanol
9056	Etorphine (except hydrochloride salt)
9200	Heroin
9301	Hydromorphinol
9302	Methyldesorphine
9304	Methyldihydromorphine
9305	Morphine methylbromide
9306	Morphine methylsulfonate
9307	Morphine-N-Oxide
9308	Myrophine
9309	Nicocodeine
9312	Nicomorphine
9313	Normorphine
9314	Pholcodine
9315	Thebacon

== Hallucinogenic or psychedelic substances ==
ACSCN	Drug
7249	α-ET
7391	4-bromo-2,5-dimethoxyamphetamine (DOB)
7392	2C-B
7396	2,5-dimethoxyamphetamine (2,5-DMA)
7399	DOET
7348	2C-T-7
7411	4-methoxyamphetamine (PMA)
7401	5-methoxy-3,4-methylenedioxyamphetamine (MMDA)
7395	4-methyl-2,5-dimethoxyamphetamine (DOM; STP)
7400	3,4-methylenedioxyamphetamine (MDA)
7405	3,4-methylenedioxymethamphetamine (MDMA)
7404	3,4-methylenedioxy-N-ethylamphetamine (MDEA; MDE)
7402	N-hydroxy-3,4-methylenedioxyamphetamine (N-hydroxy MDA)
7390	3,4,5-trimethoxyamphetamine (TMA)
7431	5-MeO-DMT
7432	Alpha-methyltryptamine (αMT)
7433	Bufotenine
7434	Diethyltryptamine (DET)
7435	Dimethyltryptamine (DMT)
7439	5-methoxy-N,N-diisopropyltryptamine (5-MeO-DIPT)
7260	Ibogaine
7315	Lysergic acid diethylamide (LSD)
7360	Marijuana (Note: This substance was the subject of an executive order on December 19, 2025. The executive order directs the US Attorney General to begin the process of moving it from a Schedule I to a Schedule III drug)
7381	Mescaline
7286	MXE
7374	Parahexyl
7415	Peyote
7482	N-ethyl-3-piperidyl benzilate
7484	N-methyl-3-piperidyl benzilate
7437	Psilocybin
7438	Psilocin
7370	Tetrahydrocannabinol (THC)
7455	Ethylamine analog of phencyclidine (Eticyclidine; PCE)
7458	Pyrrolidine analog of phencyclidine (PCPy)
7470	Thiophene analog of phencyclidine (TCP)
7473	1-[1-(2-thienyl)cyclohexyl]pyrrolidine (TCPy)
1239	4-Chloromethcathinone
1259	3-Methylmethcathinone (3-MMC)
1248	4-Methylmethcathinone (Mephedrone)
7535	3,4-methylenedioxypyrovalerone (MDPV)
7509	2-(2,5-Dimethoxy-4-ethylphenyl)ethanamine (2C-E)
7508	2-(2,5-Dimethoxy-4-methylphenyl)ethanamine (2C-D)
7519	2-(4-Chloro-2,5-dimethoxyphenyl)ethanamine (2C-C)
7518	2-(4-Iodo-2,5-dimethoxyphenyl)ethanamine (2C-I)
7385	2-[4-(Ethylthio)-2,5-dimethoxyphenyl]ethanamine (2C-T-2)
7532	2-[4-(Isopropylthio)-2,5-dimethoxyphenyl]ethanamine (2C-T-4)
7517	2-(2,5-Dimethoxyphenyl)ethanamine (2C-H)
7521	2-(2,5-Dimethoxy-4-nitro-phenyl)ethanamine (2C-N)
7524	2-(2,5-Dimethoxy-4-(n)-propylphenyl)ethanamine (2C-P)
7536	2-(4-Bromo-2,5-dimethoxyphenyl)-N-(2-methoxybenzyl) ethanamine (25B-NBOMe)
7537	2-(4-Chloro-2,5-dimethoxyphenyl)-N-(2-methoxybenzyl) ethanamine (25C-NBOMe)
7538	2-(4-Iodo-2,5-dimethoxyphenyl)-N-(2-methoxybenzyl) ethanamine (25I-NBOMe)
7540	3,4-Methylenedioxy-N-methylcathinone (methylone)

== Depressants ==
ACSCN	Drug
2010	gamma-Hydroxybutyric acid (GHB; sodium oxybate; sodium oxybutyrate) except formulations in an FDA-approved drug product are Schedule III
2572	Mecloqualone
2565	Methaqualone

== Stimulants ==
ACSCN	Drug
1219	Amineptine
1585	Aminorex (aminoxaphen; 2-amino-5-phenyl-2- oxazoline; or 4,5-dihydro-5-phenly-2-oxazolamine)
7493	N-benzylpiperazine (some other names: BZP; 1-benzylpiperazine)
1235	Cathinone
1503	Fenethylline
1476	4-Fluoroamphetamine
1237	Methcathinone (Some other names: 2-(methylamino)-propiophenone; alpha-(methylamino)propiophenone; 2-(methylamino)-1-phenylpropan-1-one; alpha-N-methylaminopropiophenone; monomethylpropion; ephedrone; N-methylcathinone; methylcathinone; AL-464; AL-422; AL-463 and UR1432), its salts, optical isomers and salts of optical isomers
1590	(±)-cis-4-methylaminorex
1475	N-ethylamphetamine
1480	N,N-dimethylamphetamine (also known as N,N-alpha-trimethyl-benzeneethanamine; N,N-alpha-trimethylphenethylamine)
7543	N-Ethylpentylone (ephylone, N-1-(1,3-benzodioxol-5-yl)-2-(ethylamino)-1-pentanone))
7246	N-Ethylhexedrone (hexen)
7544	alpha-Pyrrolidinohexanophenone (α-PHP)
7551	alpha-Pyrrolidinoisohexanophenone (also known as α-PHiP; α-PiHP)
7245	4-Methyl-alpha-ethylaminopentiophenone (4-MEAP)
7446	4'-Methyl-alpha-pyrrolidinohexiophenone (MPHP)
7548	alpha-Pyrrolidinoheptaphenone (PV8)
7443	4-Chloro-alpha-pyrrolidinovalerophenone (4-chloro-α-PVP)
1233	3-Fluoro-N-methylcathinone (3-FMC; 1-(3-fluorophenyl)-2-(methylamino)propan-1-one)
1238	4-Fluoro-N-methylcathinone (4-FMC, flephedrone, 1-(4-fluorophenyl)-2-(methylamino)propan-1-one)
1246	Pentedrone (α-methylaminovalerophenone, 2-(methylamino)-1-phenylpentan-1-one)
1249	4-Methyl-N-ethylcathinone (4-MEC, 2-(ethylamino)-1-(4-methylphenyl)propan-1-one)
1258	Naphyrone (naphthylpyrovalerone; 1-(naphthalen-2-yl)-2-(pyrrolidin-1-yl)pentan-1-one)
7498	4-Methyl-alphapyrrolidinopropiophenone (4-MePPP, MePPP, 4-methyl-α-pyrrolidinopropiophenone,1-(4-methylphenyl)-2-(pyrrolidin-1-yl)-propan-1-one)
7541	Butylone (bk-MBDB, 1-(1,3-benzodioxol-5-yl)-2-(methylamino)butan-1-one)
7542	Pentylone (bk-MBDP, 1-(1,3-benzodioxol-5-yl)-2-(methylamino)pentan-1-one)
7545	alpha-pyrrolidinopentiophenone (α-PVP, α-pyrrolidinovalerophenone, 1-phenyl-2-(pyrrolidin-1-yl)pentan-1-one)
7546	alpha-pyrrolidinobutiophenone (α-PBP, 1-phenyl-2-(pyrrolidin-1-yl)butan-1-one)
1227	Mesocarb

== Cannabimimetic agents ==
ACSCN	Drug
7297	5-(1,1-dimethylheptyl)-2-[(1R,3S)-3-hydroxycyclohexyl]-phenol (CP-47,497)
7298	5-(1,1-dimethyloctyl)-2-[(1R,3S)-3-hydroxycyclohexyl]-phenol (cannabicyclohexanol or CP-47,497 C8-homolog)
7118	1-pentyl-3-(1-naphthoyl)indole (JWH-018 and AM678)
7173	1-butyl-3-(1-naphthoyl)indole (JWH-073)
7019	1-hexyl-3-(1-naphthoyl)indole (JWH-019)
7200	1-[2-(4-morpholinyl)ethyl]-3-(1-naphthoyl)indole (JWH-200)
6250	1-pentyl-3-(2-methoxyphenylacetyl)indole (JWH-250)
7081	1-pentyl-3-[1-(4-methoxynaphthoyl)]indole (JWH-081)
7122	1-pentyl-3-(4-methyl-1-naphthoyl)indole (JWH-122)
7398	1-pentyl-3-(4-chloro-1-naphthoyl)indole (JWH-398)
7201	1-(5-fluoropentyl)-3-(1-naphthoyl)indole (AM2201)
7694	1-(5-fluoropentyl)-3-(2-iodobenzoyl)indole (AM694)
7104	1-pentyl-3-[(4-methoxy)-benzoyl]indole (SR-19 and RCS-4)
7008	1-cyclohexylethyl-3-(2-methoxyphenylacetyl)indole 7008 (SR-18 and RCS-8)
7203	1-pentyl-3-(2-chlorophenylacetyl)indole (JWH-203)
7144	(1-pentyl-1H-indol-3-yl)(2,2,3,3-tetramethylcyclopropyl)methanone, its optical, positional, and geometric isomers, salts and salts of isomers (UR-144, 1-pentyl-3-(2,2,3,3-tetramethylcyclopropoyl)indole)
7011	[1-(5-fluoro-pentyl)-1H-indol-3-yl](2,2,3,3-tetramethylcyclopropyl)methanone, its optical, positional, and geometric isomers, salts and salts of isomers (5-fluoro-UR-144, 5-F-UR-144, XLR-11, 1-(5-fluoro-pentyl)-3-(2,2,3,3-tetramethylcyclopropoyl)indole)
7048	N-(1-adamantyl)-1-pentyl-1H-indazole-3-carboxamide, its optical, positional, and geometric isomers, salts and salts of isomers (APINACA, AKB-48)
7222	Quinolin-8-yl 1-pentyl-1H-indole-3-carboxylate (QUPIC, PB-22)
7225	Quinolin-8-yl 1-(5-fluoropentyl)-1H-indole-3-carboxylate (5-fluoro-PB-22; 5F-PB-22)
7012	N-(1-amino-3-methyl-1-oxobutan-2-yl)-1-(4-fluorobenzyl)-1H-indazole-3-carboxamide (AB-FUBINACA)
7035	N-(1-amino-3,3-dimethyl-1-oxobutan-2-yl)-1-pentyl-1H-indazole-3-carboxamide (ADB-PINACA)
7031	N-(1-amino-3-methyl-1-oxobutan-2-yl)-1-(cyclohexylmethyl)-1H-indazole-3-carboxamide (AB-CHMINACA)
7023	N-(1-amino-3-methyl-1-oxobutan-2-yl)-1-pentyl-1H-indazole-3-carboxamide (AB-PINACA)
7024	[1-(5-fluoropentyl)-1H-indazol-3-yl](naphthalen-1-yl)methanone (THJ-2201)
7034	2-(1-(5-Fluoropentyl)-1H-indazole-3-carboxamido)-3,3-dimethylbutanoate (5F-ADB, 5F-MDMB-PINACA)
7033	Methyl 2-(1-(5-fluoropentyl)-1H-indazole-3-carboxamido)-3-methylbutanoate (5F-AMB)
7049	N-(Adamantan-1-yl)-1-(5-fluoropentyl)-1H-indazole-3-carboxamide (5F-APINACA, 5F-AKB48)
7010	N-(1-Amino-3,3-dimethyl-1-oxobutan-2-yl)-1-(4-fluorobenzyl)-1H-indazole-3-carboxamide (ADB-FUBINACA)
7042	Methyl 2-(1-(cyclohexylmethyl)-1H-indole-3-carboxamido)-3,3-dimethylbutanoate (MDMB-CHMICA, MMB-CHMINACA)
7020	Methyl 2-(1-(4-fluorobenzyl)-1H-indazole-3-carboxamido)-3,3-dimethylbutanoate (MDMB-FUBINACA)
7032	N-(1-amino-3,3-dimethyl-1-oxobutan-2-yl)-1-(cyclohexylmethyl)-1H-indazole-3-carboxamide (MAB-CHMINACA; ADB-CHMINACA)
7036	ethyl 2-(1-(5-fluoropentyl)-1H-indazole-3-carboxamido)-3,3-dimethylbutanoate (5F-EDMB-PINACA)
7041	methyl 2-(1-(5-fluoropentyl)-1H-indole-3-carboxamido)-3,3-dimethylbutanoate (5F-MDMB-PICA)
7047	N-(adamantan-1-yl)-1-(4-fluorobenzyl)-1H-indazole-3-carboxamide (FUB-AKB48; FUB-APINACA; AKB48 N-(4-FLUOROBENZYL))
7083	1-(5-fluoropentyl)-N-(2-phenylpropan-2-yl)-1H-indazole-3-carboxamide (5F-CUMYL-PINACA; SGT-25)
7014	(1-(4-fluorobenzyl)-1H-indol-3-yl)(2,2,3,3-tetramethylcyclopropyl) methanone (FUB-144)
7021	Methyl 2-(1-(4-fluorobenzyl)-1Hindazole-3-carboxamido)-3-methylbutanoate (FUB–AMB, MMB– FUBINACA, AMB–FUBINACA)
7025	5F-AB-PINACA (N-(1-amino-3-methyl-1-oxobutan-2-yl)-1-(5-fluoropentyl)-1H-indazole-3-carboxamide)
7044	MMB-CHMICA (AMB-CHMICA, methyl 2-(1-(cyclohexylmethyl)-1H-indole-3-carboxamido)-3-methylbutanoate)
7085	5F-CUMYL-P7AICA (1-(5-fluoropentyl)-N-(2-phenylpropan-2-yl)-1 H-pyrrolo[2,3-b]pyridine-3-carboxamide)
7089	4-CN-CUMYL-BUTINACA (1-(4-cyanobutyl)-N-(2-phenylpropan-2-yl)-1H-indazole-3-carboxamide, 4-cyano-CUMYL-BUTINACA, 4-CN-CUMYL BINACA, CUMYL-4CN-BINACA, SGT-78)
7221	NM-2201 (CBL2201, Naphthalen-1-yl 1-(5-fluoropentyl)-1H-indole-3-carboxylate)
7027	ADB-BUTINACA (N-[(2S)-1-amino-3,3-dimethyl-1-oxobutan-2-yl]-1-butyl-1H-indazole-3-carboxamide)

== See also ==
- List of Schedule II controlled substances (U.S.)
- List of Schedule III controlled substances (U.S.)
- List of Schedule IV controlled substances (U.S.)
- List of Schedule V controlled substances (U.S.)
