= Misuse of Drugs Act 1971 =

Act of the Parliament of the United Kingdom

Misuse of Drugs Act 1971 (Note: Section 40(1).)
- Act of Parliament
- Parliament of the United Kingdom
- Long title: An Act to make new provision with respect to dangerous or otherwise harmful drugs and related matters, and for purposes connected therewith.
- Citation: 1971 c. 38
- Introduced by: Reginald Maudling (Commons)
- Territorial extent: United Kingdom (Note: Section 40(2).)

Dates
- Royal assent: 27 May 1971
- Commencement: 1 February 1972 (sections 1, 32, 35, 37, 38 and 40 and schedule 1) (Note: Section 40(3). The Misuse of Drugs Act 1971 (Commencement No. 1) Order 1971.); 1 July 1973 (rest of act) (Note: Section 40(3). The Misuse of Drugs Act 1971 (Commencement No. 2) Order 1973.)
Other legislation
Amends	Extradition Act 1870; Matrimonial Proceedings (Magistrates' Courts) Act 1960; Hovercraft Act 1968; Medicines Act 1968
Repeals/revokes	Drugs (Prevention of Misuse) Act 1964; Dangerous Drugs Act 1965; Dangerous Drugs Act 1967
Amended by	Northern Ireland Constitution Act 1973; Misuse of Drugs Act 1971 (Modification) Order 1973; Criminal Procedure (Scotland) Act 1975; Misuse of Drugs Act 1971 (Modification) Order 1975; Pharmacy (Northern Ireland) Order 1976; Criminal Law Act 1977; Misuse of Drugs Act 1971 (Modification) Order 1977; Judicature (Northern Ireland) Act 1978; Domestic Proceedings and Magistrates' Courts Act 1978; Customs and Excise Management Act 1979; Magistrates' Courts Act 1980; Criminal Attempts Act 1981; Senior Courts Act 1981; Magistrates' Courts (Northern Ireland) Order 1981; Criminal Justice Act 1982; Medical Act 1983; Criminal Attempts and Conspiracy (Northern Ireland) Order 1983; Misuse of Drugs Act 1971 (Modification) Order 1983; Dentists Act 1984; Police and Criminal Evidence Act 1984; Fines and Penalties (Northern Ireland) Order 1984; Misuse of Drugs Act 1971 (Modification) Order 1984; Controlled Drugs (Penalties) Act 1985; Misuse of Drugs Act 1971 (Modification) Order 1985; Drug Trafficking Offences Act 1986; Misuse of Drugs Act 1971 (Modification) Order 1986; Criminal Justice Act 1988; Extradition Act 1989; Misuse of Drugs Act 1971 (Modification) Order 1989; Criminal Justice (International Co-operation) Act 1990; Courts and Legal Services Act 1990; Misuse of Drugs Act 1971 (Modification) Order 1990; Judicial Pensions and Retirement Act 1993; Criminal Justice and Public Order Act 1994; Drug Trafficking Act 1994; Proceeds of Crime (Northern Ireland) Order 1996; Misuse of Drugs Act 1971 (Modification) Order 1996; Misuse of Drugs Act 1971 (Modification) Order 1998; Criminal Justice and Police Act 2001; Misuse of Drugs Act 1971 (Modification) Order 2001; Proceeds of Crime Act 2002; Criminal Justice Act 2003; Misuse of Drugs Act 1971 (Modification) Order 2003; Misuse of Drugs Act 1971 (Modification) (No. 2) Order 2003; Statute Law (Repeals) Act 2004; Constitutional Reform Act 2005; Drugs Act 2005; Misuse of Drugs Act 1971 (Amendment) Order 2006; Tribunals, Courts and Enforcement Act 2007; Serious Crime Act 2007; European Qualifications (Health and Social Care Professions) Regulations 2007; Misuse of Drugs Act 1971 (Amendment) Order 2008; Northern Ireland Act 2009; Policing and Crime Act 2009; Misuse of Drugs Act 1971 (Amendment) Order 2009; Northern Ireland Act 1998 (Devolution of Policing and Justice Functions) Order 2010; Misuse of Drugs Act 1971 (Amendment) Order 2010; Misuse of Drugs Act 1971 (Amendment No. 2) Order 2010; Police Reform and Social Responsibility Act 2011; Misuse of Drugs Act 1971 (Amendment) Order 2011; Scotland Act 2012; Misuse of Drugs Act 1971 (Amendment) Order 2012; Misuse of Drugs Act 1971 (Amendment) Order 2013; Misuse of Drugs Act 1971 (Ketamine etc.) (Amendment) Order 2014; Misuse of Drugs Act 1971 (Amendment) Order 2014; Misuse of Drugs Act 1971 (Amendment) (No. 2) Order 2014; Misuse of Drugs Act 1971 (Amendment) Order 2015; Misuse of Drugs Act 1971 (Amendment) Order 2016; Criminal Justice (Scotland) Act 2016 (Consequential and Supplementary Modifications) Regulations 2017; Misuse of Drugs Act 1971 (Amendment) Order 2017; Misuse of Drugs Act 1971 (Amendment) Order 2019; Sentencing (Pre-consolidation Amendments) Act 2020; Sentencing Act 2020; Misuse of Drugs Act 1971 (Amendment) Order 2021; Judicial Review and Courts Act 2022; Public Service Pensions and Judicial Offices Act 2022; Misuse of Drugs Act 1971 (Amendment) Order 2022; Misuse of Drugs Act 1971 (Amendment) Order 2024; Misuse of Drugs Act 1971 (Amendment) (No. 2) Order 2024
Relates to	Customs and Excise Act 1952

Status: Amended

Text of statute as originally enacted

Text of the Misuse of Drugs Act 1971 as in force today (including any amendments) within the United Kingdom, from legislation.gov.uk.

The Misuse of Drugs Act 1971 (c. 38) is an act of the Parliament of the United Kingdom. It represents action in line with treaty commitments under the Single Convention on Narcotic Drugs, the Convention on Psychotropic Substances, and the United Nations Convention Against Illicit Traffic in Narcotic Drugs and Psychotropic Substances.

Offences under the act include:

- Possession of a controlled drug unlawfully
- Possession of a controlled drug with intent to supply it
- Supplying or offering to supply a controlled drug (even where no charge is made for the drug)
- Allowing premises you occupy or manage to be used unlawfully for the purpose of producing or supplying controlled drugs

The act establishes the Home Secretary as the principal authority in a drug licensing system. Therefore, for example, various opiates are available legally as prescription-only medicines, and cannabis (hemp) may be grown under licence for 'industrial purposes'. The Misuse of Drugs Regulations 2001 (SI 2001/3998), created under the 1971 Act, are about licensing of production, possession and supply of substances classified under the act. These created drug 'schedules', under which the supply of drugs is controlled.

The act creates three classes of controlled substances, A, B, and C, and ranges of penalties for illegal or unlicensed possession and possession with intent to supply are graded differently within each class. The lists of substances within each class can be amended by Order in Council, so the Home Secretary can list new drugs and upgrade, downgrade or delist previously controlled drugs with less of the bureaucracy and delay associated with passing an act through both Houses of Parliament.

Critics of the act such as David Nutt say that its classification is not based on how harmful or addictive the substances are, and that it is unscientific to omit substances like tobacco and alcohol.

== List of controlled drugs ==
These drugs are known in the UK as controlled drug, because this is the term by which the act itself refers to them. In more general terms, however, many of these drugs are also controlled by the Medicines Act 1968, there are many other drugs which are controlled by the Medicines Act but not by the Misuse of Drugs Act, and some other drugs (alcohol, for example) are controlled by other laws.

The act sets out four separate categories: Class A, Class B, Class C and temporary class drugs. Substances may be removed and added to different parts of the schedule by statutory instrument, provided a report of the Advisory Council on the Misuse of Drugs (ACMD) has been commissioned and has reached a conclusion, although the Secretary of State is not bound by the council's findings.

- Class A includes cocaine, heroin, morphine, oxycodone, fentanyl, MDMA ("ecstasy"), methamphetamine, opium, LSD, hydrocodone, DMT, mescaline extracts, (Note: Plants containing mescaline not illegal, only an extract of the substance.) and psilocybin/psilocin (magic mushrooms).
- Class B includes cannabis, synthetic and semisynthetic cannabinoids, ketamine, amphetamine, codeine, methcathinone, barbiturates, mephedrone, methaqualone, methylphenidate, GHB, and GBL. Any class B drug that is prepared for injection use becomes a class A substance.
- Class C includes benzodiazepines, xylazine, pregabalin, and most other non-barbiturate tranquillisers; tramadol, gabapentin; anabolic steroids, nitrous oxide, khat, substituted piperazines, and substituted cathinones.
- All other psychoactive drugs except alcohol, caffeine, and tobacco (or other approved nicotine preparations) are controlled under the Psychoactive Substances Act 2016 and Medicines Act 1968.

In reality the potential harm has little bearing on the class, which has led to dissatisfaction with drug laws.

This list has in practice been modified a great number of times, sometimes removing substances, but more commonly adding some; for example, many benzodiazepines became Class C drugs in 1985, and many cathinones became Class B drugs in 2010.

Glossary of terminology used in this list

anabolic steroids – hormones that build muscle tissue
benzodiazepines – a class of sedative/anxiolytic drugs
cannabinoids – drugs that bind to cannabinoid receptors
arylcyclohexamines – dissociatives which act on the NMDA receptors
opioids – drugs that bind to opioid receptors
phenethylamines – psychedelics based on phenethylamine
sedatives – drugs that lower arousal
stimulants – drugs that heighten arousal
tryptamines – psychedelics based on tryptamine

=== Class A drugs ===
1. The following substances:

Name as specified in the act	Brand or street name	Drug type	Year added	Notes and comments
Acetorphine		opioid	1971	primarily used to sedate elephants, giraffes and rhinos
Alfentanil		opioid	1984	
Allylprodine		opioid	1971	
Alphacetylmethadol		opioid	1971	synthetic
Alphameprodine		opioid	1971	
Alphamethadol		opioid	1971	
Alphaprodine		opioid	1971	
Anileridine		opioid	1971	
Benzethidine		opioid	1971	
Benzylmorphine		opioid	1971	
Betacetylmethadol		opioid	1971	
Betameprodine		opioid	1971	
Betamethadol		opioid	1971	
Betaprodine		opioid	1971	
Bezitramide	Burgodin	opioid	1971	
Bufotenin	Toad skin toxin	tryptamine	1971	found in the skins of psychoactive toads, especially Bufo alvarius
Carfentanil	Wildnil	opioid	1986	Strongest known opioid; 10,000 times more potent than morphine, 100 times more potent than fentanyl. Used as a tranquilliser for large game (elephants etc.).
Clonitazene		opioid	1971	
Coca leaf		Erythroxylum	1971	the plant from which cocaine is derived
Cocaine	Coke, crack, rock, girl, Charlie, sniff, snow, packet, blow, whiff, gear, bugle, toot, bag, the Devil's dandruff, marching powder	Tropane alkaloid	1971	
Desomorphine	Krokodil (Russian for crocodile)	opioid	1971	Primarily used in Russia and Ukraine. Its full chemical name is dihydrodesoxymorphine, and is a 3,6 diester salt of morphine
Dextromoramide	Palfium	opioid	1971	
Diampromide		opioid	1971	
Diethylthiambutene		opioid	1971	
Difenoxin	Roskies	opioid	1975	
Dihydrocodeinone O-carboxymethyloxime		opioid	1971	
Dihydroetorphine		opioid (see notes)	2003	Semi-synthetic opioid; derivative of etorphine
Dihydromorphine	Paramorphan	opioid	1971	
Dimenoxadol		opioid	1971	
Dimepheptanol		opioid	1971	An analogue of methadone
Dimethylthiambutene		opioid	1971	
Dioxaphetyl butyrate		opioid	1971	
Diphenoxylate		opioid	1971	
Dipipanone		opioid	1971	
Drotebanol		opioid	1973	
Ecgonine		precursor	1971	"and any derivative of ecgonine which is convertible to ecgonine or to cocaine"
Ethylmethylthiambutene		opioid	1971	
Eticyclidine		arylcyclohexylamine	1984	
Etonitazene		opioid	1971	
Etorphine		opioid	1971	1,000–3,000 times more potent than morphine, veterinary use only for large game
Etoxeridine		opioid	1971	
Etryptamine		Tryptamine	1998	
Fentanyl	Actiq, Duragesic, Sublimaze	opioid	1971	Approximately 100 times the strength of morphine
Furethidine		opioid	1971	
Hydrocodone	Vicodin, Norco, Lortab	opioid	1971	
Hydromorphinol		opioid	1971	
Hydromorphone	Dilaudid, Palladone, Hymorphan, drug store heroin	opioid	1971	
Hydroxypethidine		opioid	1971	
Isomethadone		opioid	1971	Simple positional isomer of Methadone
Ketobemidone		opioid	1971	
Levomethorphan		opioid	1971	
Levomoramide		opioid	1971	The totally inactive isomer of dextromoramide
Levophenacylmorphan		opioid	1971	
Levorphanol	Levo-Dromoran	opioid	1971	
Lofentanil		opioid	1986	
Lysergamide		ergoline	1971	A precursor to LSD
Lysergic acid diethylamide	LSD, acid	ergoline	1971	"Lysergide and other N-alkyl derivatives of lysergamide"
Mescaline	Mescal	phenethylamine	1971	found naturally in types of cactus; cacti themselves not illegal
MDMA	MD, Ecstasy (abbreviated E, X, or XTC), Molly (US), or Mandy (UK)	phenethylamine	1977	Not specifically named but covered by the ban of alkylenedioxy-substituted phenethylamines
MDA		phenethylamine	1977	Not specifically named but covered by the ban of alkylenedioxy-substituted phenethylamines
Metazocine		opioid	1971	
Methadone	Methadose, Dolophine	opioid	1971	Used in opioid replacement therapy to treat addiction
Methadyl acetate		opioid	1971	used in treating opioid addiction, structurally related to methadone
Methamphetamine	Desoxyn, crystal meth, meth, ice, glass, tina, crank, gak, and others	stimulant	2006	Moved from class B to class A in 2006
Methyldesorphine		opioid	1971	
Methyldihydromorphine		opioid	1971	
Metopon		opioid	1971	
Morphine	MS, dope, hard stuff, Miss Emma, junk, Mister Blue, God's drug, dreamer	opioid	1971	Derivative of the opium poppy and powerful narcotic painkiller
Morphine diacetate	H, heroin, smack, dope, boy, junk, black tar, skag, hero	opioid	1971	3,6 diester salt of morphine, morphine prodrug
Morphine methobromide		opioid	1971	"morphine N-oxide and other pentavalent nitrogen morphine derivatives"
Myrophine		opioid	1971	
Nicomorphine		opioid	1971	3,6 diester salt of morphine
Noracymethadol		opioid	1971	
Norlevorphanol		opioid	1971	
Normethadone		opioid	1971	
Normorphine		opioid	1971	
Norpipanone	Hexalgon	methadol	1971	
Opium	Laudanum, Pantopon	opioid mixture	1971	Milky secretion of the opium poppy – banned "whether raw, prepared or medicinal"
Oxycodone	OxyContin, Percocet	opioid	1971	Widely used strong pain killer
Oxymorphone	Numorphan, Opana	opioid	1971	
Pethidine	Meperidine, Demerol, Dolantine	opioid	1971	
Phenadoxone		opioid	1971	
Phenampromide		opioid	1971	
Phenazocine		opioid	1971	Discontinued in 2001
Phencyclidine	Angel dust, PCP	arylcyclohexylamine	1979	
Phenomorphan		opioid	1971	
Phenoperidine		opioid	1971	
Piminodine		opioid	1971	
Piritramide	Dipidolor	opioid	1971	
Poppy-straw		Papaver somniferum	1971	"Poppy-straw and concentrate of poppy-straw."
Proheptazine		opioid	1971	
Properidine		opioid	1971	
Psilocin		Tryptamine	1971	Psychoactive ingredient found in most psychedelic mushrooms; includes the prodrug psilocybin.
Psilocybin mushroom	Magic mushrooms, shrooms	fungi	2005	"Fungus (of any kind) that contains psilocin or an ester of psilocin."
Racemethorphan		opioid mixture	1971	Racemic mixture of dextromethorphan (DXM) and levomethorphan
Racemoramide		opioid mixture	1971	
Racemorphan		opioid mixture	1971	
Remifentanil		opioid	2003	Strong painkiller; cannot be used without plasma infusion equipment
Rolicyclidine	PCPy	arylcyclohexylamine	1984	Very similar to phencyclidine (PCP)
Sufentanil	Sufenta	opioid	1983	
Tenocyclidine	TCP	arylcyclohexylamine	1984	Very similar to phencyclidine (PCP), but considerably more potent
Tapentadol	Nucynta	opioid	2009	Dual action as a norepinephrine reuptake inhibitor
Thebacon	Acedicone	opioid	1971	
Thebaine		opioid	1971	
Tilidate	Valtran	opioid	1983	
Trimeperidine		opioid	1971	
2,5-Dimethoxy-4-bromoamphetamine	DOB	phenethylamine	1975	a drug of the DOx family
4-Cyano-2-dimethylamino-4,4-diphenylbutane		opioid (see note)	1971	Methadone intermediate
4-Cyano-1-methyl-4-phenyl-piperidine		opioid (see note)	1971	Intermediate chemical in generation of the opioid, Pethidine
N,N-Diethyltryptamine	DET, T-9	tryptamine	1971	
N,N-Dimethyltryptamine	DMT, Changa	tryptamine	1971	Intense psychedelic drug
2,5-Dimethoxy-4-methylamphetamine	DOM	phenethylamine	1971	a drug of the DOx family.
N-Hydroxy-tenamphetamine	MDOH	stimulant	1990	
1-Methyl-4-phenylpiperidine-4-carboxylic acid	Pethidinic acid	precursor	1971	
2-Methyl-3-morpholino-1,1-diphenylpropanecarboxylic acid		opioid (see notes)	1971	Converted in the body into the opioid Moramide
4-Methyl-aminorex	Ice	stimulant	1990	
4-Methyl-5-(4-methylphenyl)-4,5-dihydrooxazol-2-amine	Serotoni, 4,4'-DMAR	stimulant	2015	
1-Cyclohexyl-4-(1,2-diphenylethyl)piperazine	MT-45	opioid	2015	
4-Phenylpiperidine-4-carboxylic acid ethyl ester	Norpethidine	opioid (see notes)	1971	Commonly used in the production of Pethidine, although it has little opioid activity in its own right

N.B. Sub-paragraphs (b) and (c) were added in 1977, sub-paragraphs (d) and (e) were added in 1986. Sub-paragraph (ba) was subsequently added in 2001.

(b) any compound structurally derived from tryptamine or from a ring-hydroxy tryptamine by modification.

(ba) a number of phenethylamine derivatives.

(c) compounds structurally derived from phenethylamine an N-alkylphenethylamine, a methylphenethylamine, an N-alkyl-α-methylphenethylamine, an ethylphenethylamine, or an N-alkyl-α-ethylphenethylamine by certain modifications.

(d) compounds structurally derived from fentanyl by certain modifications.

(e) compounds structurally derived from pethidine by certain modifications.

(ea) any compound with a maximum molecular mass of 500 atomic mass units and structurally derived from 2-(2-benzyl-benzimidazol-1-yl)ethanamine.

(f) any compound structurally derived from mescaline, 4-bromo-2,5-dimethoxy-α-methylphenethylamine, 2,5-dimethoxy-α,4-dimethylphenethylamine, N-hydroxytenamphetamine (N-hydroxy-MDA), or a compound specified in sub-paragraph (ba) or (c) above, by substitution at the nitrogen atom of the amino group with a benzyl substituent, whether or not substituted in the phenyl ring of the benzyl group to any extent.

2. Any stereoisomeric of a class A substance, excluding dextromethorphan or dextrorphan.

3. Any ester or ether of a class A substance (that is not listed as a class B substance).

4. Any salt of a class A substance.

5. Any preparation or other product containing a class A substance

6. Any preparation of a class B substance designed for administration by injection.

=== Class B drugs ===
1. The following substances:

(a)

Name as specified in the act	Brand or street name	Drug type	Year added	Notes and comments
Acetyldihydrocodeine		opioid	1971	
Amphetamine	Adderall, Speed, whizz	stimulant	1971	
Codeine	Purple drank, Lean, Wock	opioid	1971	legal without prescription in quantities of up to 12.8 mg per dosage unit or 15 mg/5 ml in oral solution and only in combination with other drug. UK Codeine law
Cannabinol and derivatives		cannabinoid, psychoactive	2009	downgraded from class A to class C in 2004 and upgraded to class B in 2009 (Legalised for medicinal use in July 2018, and law excludes cannabidiol entirely)
Cannabis	Cannabis, Green, Hash, Marijuana, Pot, Puff, Gas, Bud, Skunk, Ganja, Weed (among others)	cannabinoid, psychedelic	2009	All cannabis varieties, including those grown as hemp, are controlled under the act, not just drug varieties Downgraded from class B to class C in 2004 and upgraded to class B in 2009
Dihydrocodeine	Paracodine, Synalgos DC	opioid	1971	legal in amounts up to 30 mg prescribed by doctor in tablet form and compounded with an adjunct non-opioid such as paracetamol.
Ethylmorphine	Codethyline	opioid	1971	
Glutethimide	Doriden	sedative	1985	
Ketamine	Ketalar, Special K, Ket, Kenny, Kenneth, horse tranquilliser	sedative	2006, moved to class B in 2014	Used by Doctors on Air Ambulance duties to provide pain relief for serious or life-threatening injuries in extreme circumstances, when casualty sedation is required prior to a potential RSI.
Lefetamine		stimulant	1985	
Lisdexamfetamine	Elvanse in the UK, Vyvanse in the US	stimulant	2014	
Mecloqualone		sedative	1984	
a-Methylphenethylhydroxylamine			2001	
Methaqualone	Ludes, Mandrake, Mandrax, Quaalude	sedative	1984	
Methcathinone		stimulant	1998	
Methoxetamine		dissociative	2013	
4–Methylmethcathinone	MCAT, Mephedrone, Meow Meow, Bath Salts	stimulant	2010	
Methylone	M1	stimulant	2010	
Methylphenidate	Ritalin, Concerta	stimulant	1971	
Methylphenobarbitone		sedative	1984	
Naphyrone	NRG-1	stimulant	2010	
Nicocodeine		opioid	1971	
Nicodicodine		opioid	1973	
Norcodeine		opioid	1971	
Pentazocine	Talwin, Fortal	opioid	1985	
Phenmetrazine	Preludin	stimulant	1971	
Pholcodine		opioid	1971	
Propiram		opioid	1973	
Zipeprol		opioid	1998	

(aa) Compounds structurally derived from 2–amino–1–phenyl–1–propanone by certain modifications.

(ab) Compounds structurally derived from 2–aminopropan–1–one by certain modifications.

(b) any 5,5 disubstituted barbituric acid.

(c) and (ca) A number of categories of synthetic cannabinoids.

(d) 1-Phenylcyclohexylamine or compounds structurally derived from 1-phenylcyclohexylamine or 2-amino-2-phenylcyclohexanone by certain modifications (that are not already class A substances).

(e) Any compound structurally derived from 1-benzofuran, 2,3-dihydro-1-benzofuran, 1H-indole, indoline, 1H-indene, or indane by certain modifications.

2. Any stereoisomeric form of a class B substance.

3. Any salt of a class B substance.

4. Any preparation or other product containing a class B substance, excluding those designed for administration by injection which are class A.

=== Class C drugs ===
1. The following substances:

(a)

Name as specified in the act	Brand or street name	Drug type	Year added	Notes and comments
Adinazolam	Deracyn	benzodiazepine	2017	
Alprazolam	Xanax	benzodiazepine	1985	
Aminorex		stimulant	1998	
Benzphetamine	Didrex	stimulant	1971	metabolised into amphetamine and methamphetamine
Bromazepam	Lexotan	benzodiazepine	1985	
Brotizolam	Lendormin	benzodiazepine	1998	
Buprenorphine	Bupeaze, Buprenex, Subutex	opioid	1989	used for opioid replacement therapy to treat addiction
Camazepam		benzodiazepine	1985	
Cathine		stimulant	1986	Khat (Catha edulis), the plant in which Cathine originates, is now also illegal in the UK
Cathinone		stimulant	1986	Khat (Catha edulis), the plant in which Cathinone originates, is now also illegal in the UK
Chlordiazepoxide	Librium	benzodiazepine	1985	
Chlorphentermine	Apsedon	stimulant	1971	
Clobazam	Frisium	benzodiazepine	1985	
Clorazepic acid	Tranxène	benzodiazepine	1985	
Clonazepam	Rivotril, Klonopin	benzodiazepine	1985	
Clotiazepam	Clozan	benzodiazepine	1985	
Cloxazolam		benzodiazepine	1985	
Delorazepam		benzodiazepine	1985	
Dextropropoxyphene	Darvon, Depronal	opioid	1983	
Diazepam	Valium	benzodiazepine	1985	
Diethylpropion		stimulant	1984	
Estazolam	ProSom	benzodiazepine	1985	
Ethchlorvynol	Placidyl	sedative	1985	
Ethinamate		sedative	1985	
Etilamfetamine		stimulant	1986	
Ethyl loflazepate		benzodiazepine	1985	
Fencamfamine		stimulant	1971	Removed from the schedule in 1973, added to the schedule again in 1986
Fenethylline		stimulant	1986	
Fenproporex		stimulant	1986	
Fludiazepam		benzodiazepine	1985	
Flunitrazepam	Rohypnol	benzodiazepine	1985	
Flurazepam	Dalmane, Staurodorm	benzodiazepine	1985	
Gabapentin	Neurontin	Gabapentinoid	2019	
gamma-Butyrolactone	GBL	sedative	2009	Metabolised to GHB in the body. Classified in December 2009
Halazepam		benzodiazepine	1985	
Haloxazolam		benzodiazepine	1985	
Ketazolam		benzodiazepine	1985	
Loprazolam	Dormonoct	benzodiazepine	1985	
Lorazepam	Ativan	benzodiazepine	1985	
Lormetazepam	Noctamid, Loramet	benzodiazepine	1985	
Mazindol		stimulant	1985	
Medazepam		benzodiazepine	1985	
Mefenorex		stimulant	1986	amphetamine derivative, metabolises to amphetamine
Mephentermine		stimulant	1971	
Meprobamate	Miltown	sedative	1985	
Mesocarb		stimulant	1998	used to counteract the effects of benzodiazepines
Methyprylone		sedative	1985	
Midazolam	Versed	benzodiazepine	1990	
Nitrous oxide	Whippets, balloons, 'loons, NOS	Psychedelic	2023	
Nimetazepam		benzodiazepine	1985	
Nitrazepam	Mogadon	benzodiazepine	1985	
Nordazepam	Calmday	benzodiazepine	1985	
Oxazepam	Seresta	benzodiazepine	1985	
Oxazolam		benzodiazepine	1985	
Pemoline		stimulant	1989	
Phendimetrazine	Bontril	stimulant	1971	
Phentermine	Fastin, Ionamin	stimulant	1985	
Pinazepam		benzodiazepine	1985	
Pipradrol		stimulant	1971	
~~Propylhexedrine~~		stimulant	1971	legalised in 1995
Prazepam	Lysanxia	benzodiazepine	1985	
Pregabalin	Axalid, Lyrica	gabapentinoid	2019	
Pyrovalerone		stimulant	1986	
Temazepam	Restoril, jellies	benzodiazepine	1985	becomes class A when prepared for injection
Tetrazepam		benzodiazepine	1985	
Tramadol		opioid	2014	Also functions as a weak SNRI.
Triazolam	Halcion	benzodiazepine	1985	
Zaleplon	Sonata	nonbenzodiazepine	2014	
Zolpidem	Ambien	nonbenzodiazepine	2003	
Zopiclone	Imovane	nonbenzodiazepine	2014	

N.B. Sub-paragraphs (b), (c), (d) and (e) all refer to anabolic steroids that were banned in 1996 (unless referenced otherwise):

(b)

- 4-Androstene-3,17-dione
- 5-Androstene-3,17-diol
- Atamestane
- Bolandiol
- Bolasterone
- Bolazine
- Boldenone
- Bolenol
- Bolmantalate
- Calusterone
- 4-Chloromethandienone
- Clostebol
- Desoxymethyltestosterone
- Dienedione
- Drostanolone
- Enestebol
- Epitiostanol
- Ethyloestrenol
- Fluoxymesterone
- Formebolone
- Furazabol
- Mebolazine
- Mepitiostane
- Mesabolone
- Mestanolone
- Mesterolone
- Methandienone
- Methandriol
- Methenolone
- Methyltestosterone
- Metribolone
- Mibolerone
- Nandrolone
- 19-Nor-4-Androstene-3,17-dione
- 19-Nor-5-Androstene-3,17-diol
- Norboletone
- Norclostebol
- Norethandrolone
- Ovandrotone
- Oxabolone
- Oxandrolone
- Oxymesterone
- Oxymetholone
- Prasterone
- Propetandrol
- Quinbolone
- Roxibolone
- Silandrone
- Stanolone
- Stanozolol
- Stenbolone
- Testosterone
- Thiomesterone
- Trenbolone

(c) Compounds structurally derived from 17-hydroxyandrostan-3-one or from 17-hydroxyestran-3-one by certain modifications, excluding Trilostane or a compounds listed above.

(ca) 1–benzylpiperazine or compounds structurally derived from 1–benzylpiperazine or 1–phenylpiperazine by certain modifications.

(d) any substance which is an ester and/or ether of a substance specified in (b) or (c) above.

(e)

- Chorionic gonadotropin
- Clenbuterol
- Non-human chorionic gonadotrophin
- Somatotropin
- Somatrem
- Somatropin

=== Derivatives and analogues ===
The act contains several references to "derivatives" of compounds but the extent of this term is not fully clarified. Where unspecified it is thought to indicate derivatives which can be made from the specified compound in a single synthetic step, although such a definition would indicate that alkyllysergamide analogues would be uncontrolled. Where the derivatives are specified to be "structural derivatives" there is precedent that the statute applies whenever the structure could be converted to the specified derivatives in any number of synthetic steps.

== Penalties ==
The penalties for drug offences depend on the class of drug involved. These penalties are enforced against those who do not have a valid prescription or licence to possess the drug in question. Thus, it is not illegal for someone to possess heroin, a Class A drug, so long as it was administered to them legally (by prescription).

Class A drugs attract the highest penalty, and imprisonment is both "proper and expedient". The maximum penalties possible are as follows:

Offence	Court	Class A	Class B / Temporary class	Class C
Possession	Magistrates	6 months / £5000 fine	3 months / £2500 fine	3 months / £500 fine
Possession	Crown	7 years / unlimited fine	5 years / unlimited fine	2 years / unlimited fine
Supply and possession with intent to supply	Magistrates	6 months / £5000 fine	6 months / £5000 fine	3 months / £2000 fine
Supply and possession with intent to supply	Crown	Life / unlimited fine	14 years / unlimited fine	14 years / unlimited fine

== International cooperation ==
The act makes it a crime to assist in, incite, or induce, the commission of an offence, outside the UK, against another nation's corresponding law on drugs. A corresponding law is defined as another country's law "providing for the control and regulation in that country of the production, supply, use, export and import of drugs and other substances in accordance with the provisions of the Single Convention on Narcotic Drugs" or another drug control treaty to which the UK and the other country are parties. An example might be lending money to a United States drug dealer for the purpose of violating that country's Controlled Substances Act.

== Schedules ==
The acts allow and regulate the use of some Controlled Drugs (designated CD) by various classes of persons (e.g. doctors) acting in their professional capacity. The Royal Pharmaceutical Society maintains a live database of the legal classification of medicines. Special responsibilities are placed upon pharmaceutical wholesalers, pharmacies and doctors in the stocking, distribution, issuing of prescriptions, supply and disposal of items listed under the first three of the schedules. The regulations have been further tightened since Dr. Harold Shipman used diamorphine to murder hundreds of his patients during the late 20th century.

=== Schedule 1 - CD Lic ===
Drugs which are not used medically, and thus their possession and supply is prohibited; e.g. DMT and LSD except when licensed by the Home Office to carry out research.

=== Schedule 2 - CD ===
Substances subject to the full controlled drug requirements; e.g. cannabis, diamorphine (heroin), pethidine, cocaine, methadone, methylphenidate, dextroamphetamine, fentanyl and oxycodone. Under the Act, a prescription for these drugs need to show full details including the form and strength of the preparation, with the total quantity written out in both words and figures. It is an offence for a doctor to issue an incomplete prescription or for a pharmacist to dispense a controlled drug unless all the required details are given.

It is the prescriber's responsibility to minimize the risk of dependence or misuse by ensuring that such drugs are not started for a particular patient without good cause, that the dose is not increased to the point where dependency is more likely, and to avoid being an unwitting source of supply for addicts. The quantities of controlled drugs prescribed should match the likely needs of the patients until the next clinical review and prescription forms should be secured against theft.

Requirements for safe custody in pharmacies apply to all Schedule 2 Controlled Drugs except quinalbarbitone.

The safe custody requirements ensure that pharmacists and doctors holding stock of controlled drugs must store them in securely fixed double-locked steel safety cabinets. In addition to traditional written registers, which must be bound, contain separate entries for each drug, and be written in ink with no use of correction fluid, electronic controlled drugs registers are now also permitted under the Misuse of Drugs Regulations 2001 (as amended). These electronic systems must comply with specific regulatory standards to ensure the accurate recording and tracking of controlled substances, and there are a range of commercially available electronic CD registers. Disposal of expired stock must be witnessed by a designated inspector (either a police officer or a suitably qualified official).

Until 2005 prescriptions for most schedule 2 and 3 drugs required certain details to be handwritten by the prescriber, unless they hold a handwriting exemption certificate. The Shipman Inquiry however, found that this was one of the weaknesses in the audit system. Whereas computer generated prescriptions automatically left an audit trail which was easy to follow, handwritten prescriptions did not, even though all filed prescriptions are eventually sent to a central UK depositary. Therefore, good practice now calls for these prescriptions to be computer generated.

=== Schedule 3 - CD No Reg ===
Include drugs subject to the same prescription requirements as Schedule 2 drugs, but without the requirement to maintain registers. With the exception of phenobarbitone or related drugs for treatment of epilepsy, no Sch 3 drug can be given as an emergency supply. Safe custody is currently only required for Tenuate Dospan (diethylpropion), buprenorphine products, temazepam and flunitrazepam (Rohypnol). Neither phenobarbitone nor midazolam require safe custody. Other Sch 3 drugs can be stored in the general dispensary.

=== Schedule 4 ===
Controlled drug prescription requirements and safe custody requirements do not apply. Included drugs are Benzodiazepines (Subclass CD Benz), other than temazepam, flunitrazepam or midazolam, and androgenic and anabolic steroids (Subclass CD Anab). However CD Benz products- which also include mild stimulants such as mesocarb and fencamfamine, formerly prescribed as anorectics- are illegal to supply or possess without prescription and all Sch 4 drugs cannot be legally supplied without medical authority.

As of April 2014 "Sativex", the cannabis derived medicine prescribed for spasticity due to Multiple Sclerosis, is listed as a Schedule 4 Part 1 drug, whereas before that date it was a Schedule 1 drug requiring reporting and recording protocols (as earlier indicated on this page).

=== Schedule 5 - CD Inv P & CD Inv POM ===
Includes items which, because of their strength, are exempt from all requirements other than the need to retain invoices for two years.

== History ==
The Drugs (Prevention of Misuse) Act 1964 controlled amphetamines in the United Kingdom in advance of international agreements and was later used to control LSD.

Before 1971, the UK had a relatively liberal drugs policy and it was not until United Nations influence had been brought to bear that controlling incidental drug activities was employed to effectively criminalise drugs use. It is noted that bar the smoking of opium and cannabis; section 8, part d, under the Misuse of Drugs Act 1971 was not an offence (relating to the prosecution of the owner of a premises/building inside of which controlled drugs were being used). Section 8 of the Misuse of Drugs Act 1971 was amended by regulation 13 of Misuse of Drugs Regulations 1985 (SI 1985/2066) and section 38 of the Criminal Justice and Police Act 2001. These amendments were, however, repealed in 2005 by Schedule 1 (part 6) of the Drugs Act 2005.

The current section 8 covers: people knowingly allowing premises they own, manage, or have responsibility for, to be used by any other person for:

- administration or use of any controlled drug
- supply of any controlled drug
- the production or cultivation of controlled drugs, (such as growing cannabis, making crystal meth, preparing magic mushrooms).

== Criticism and controversy ==
Notable criticism of the act includes:

- Drug classification: making a hash of it?, Fifth Report of Session 2005–06, House of Commons Science and Technology Committee, which said that the present system of drug classification is based on historical assumptions, not scientific assessment.
- Development of a rational scale to assess the harm of drugs of potential misuse, David Nutt, Leslie A. King, William Saulsbury, Colin Blakemore, The Lancet, 24 March 2007, said the act is "not fit for purpose" and "the exclusion of alcohol and tobacco from the Misuse of Drugs Act is, from a scientific perspective, arbitrary."

The Transform Drug Policy Foundation offers rational criticism of the harms caused by the Government's current prohibitionist drug policy. The Drug Equality Alliance (DEA) has launched legal actions against the UK Government's partial and unequal administration of the Act's discretionary powers, making particular reference to the arbitrary exclusion of alcohol and tobacco on the subjective grounds of historical and cultural precedents contrary to the Act's policy and objects.

Following the release of the Cambridge Two – Ruth Wyner and John Brock – who had been convicted under Section 8 of the Act in 1999, a campaign calling for an overhaul of the Act was backed by Michael Winner, Julie Christie, and Tom Stoppard in response to the original conviction.

Classification of cannabis has become especially controversial. In 2004, cannabis was reclassified from class B to class C, in accordance with advice from the ACMD. In 2009, it was returned to class B, against ACMD advice.

In February 2009 the UK government was accused by its most senior expert drugs adviser, Professor David Nutt, of making a political decision with regard to drug classification in rejecting the scientific advice to downgrade ecstasy from a class A drug. The ACMD report on ecstasy, based on a 12-month study of 4,000 academic papers, concluded that it is nowhere near as dangerous as other class A drugs such as heroin and crack cocaine, and should be downgraded to class B. The advice was not followed. Jacqui Smith, then Home Secretary, was also widely criticised by the scientific community for bullying Professor David Nutt into apologising for his comments that, in the course of a normal year, more people died from falling off horses than died from taking ecstasy. Professor Nutt was later sacked by Alan Johnson (Jacqui Smith's successor as Home Secretary), with Johnson saying: "It is important that the government's messages on drugs are clear and as an adviser you do nothing to undermine public understanding of them. I cannot have public confusion between scientific advice and policy and have therefore lost confidence in your ability to advise me as Chair of the ACMD."

In May 2011, a report named Taking Drugs Seriously was released by Demos. It discusses several issues with the current system, since its enactment in 1971. It states that the constant presence of new drugs will make it difficult for the government to keep up with the latest situation – more than 600 drugs are now classified under the act. Comparison levels of harm previously demonstrated by David Nutt show that alcohol and tobacco were among the most lethal, while some class A drugs, such as MDMA, LSD, and magic mushrooms, were among the least harmful.

== Use of controlled substances for research ==
A common misunderstanding among researchers is that most national laws (including the Misuse for Drugs Act) allows the use of small amounts of a controlled substance for non-clinical / non-in vivo research without licences. A typical use case might be having a few milligrams or microlitres of a controlled substance within larger chemical collections (often tens of thousands of chemicals) for in vitro screening. Researchers often believe that there is some form of "research exemption" for such small amounts. This incorrect view may be further re-enforced by R&D chemical suppliers often stating and asking scientists to confirm that anything bought is for research use only.

A further misconception is that the Misuse of Drugs Act simply lists a few hundred substances (e.g. MDMA, Fentanyl, Amphetamine, etc.) and compliance can be achieved via checking a CAS number, chemical name or similar identifier. However, the reality is that in most cases all ethers, esters, salts and stereo isomers are also controlled and it is impossible to simply list all of these. The act contains several "generic statements" or "chemical space" laws, which aim to control all chemicals similar to the "named" substance, these provide detailed descriptions similar to Markushes, a good example of a few of these are found in the Misuse of Drugs Act 1971 (amendment) order 2013.

Due to this complexity in legislation the identification of controlled chemicals in research is often carried out computationally, either by in house systems maintained a company's sample logistics department or by the use of commercial software solutions. Automated systems are often required as many research operations can often have chemical collections running into 10Ks of molecules at the 1–5 mg scale, which are likely to include controlled substances, especially within medicinal chemistry research, even if the core research of the company is not narcotic or psychotropic drugs. These may not have been controlled when created, but they have subsequently been declared controlled, or fall within chemical space close to known controlled substances.

There are no specific research exemptions in the Misuse of Drugs Act 1971. However, the associated Misuse of Drugs Regulations 2001 (SI 2001/3998) does exempt products containing less than 1 mg of a controlled substance (1 μg for lysergide and derivatives) so long as a number of requirements are met, including that it cannot be recovered by readily applicable means, does not pose a risk to human health and is not meant for administration to a human or animal.

Although this does at first seem to allow research use, in most circumstances the sample, by definition, is "recoverable" – in order to prepare it for use the sample is "recovered" into an assay buffer or solvent such as DMSO or water. In 2017 the Home Office also confirmed that the 1 mg limit applies to the total of all preparations across the entire container in the case of sample microtitre plates. Given this, most companies and researchers choose not to rely on this exemption.

However, according to Home Office licensing, "University research departments generally do not require licences to possess and supply drugs in schedules 2, 3, 4 part I, 4 part II and schedule 5, but they do require licences to produce any of those drugs and to produce, possess and/or supply drugs in schedule 1".

== See also ==
- Cannabis in the United Kingdom
- Crime in the United Kingdom
- Dangerous Drugs (Supply to Addicts) Regulations 1968
- Drug policy of the United Kingdom
- Drug-related deaths in the United Kingdom
- Legal status of psychedelic drugs in the United Kingdom
- Temporary class drug
- War on drugs
