= Methade =

Names
- Preferred IUPAC name N,N-Dimethyl-4,4-diphenylheptan-2-amine

Identifiers
CAS Number	875247-95-3
3D model (JSmol)	Interactive image
ChemSpider	129556844
PubChem CID	71308237
CompTox Dashboard (EPA)	DTXSID901030352
- InChI: InChI=1S/C21H29N/c1-5-16-21(17-18(2)22(3)4,19-12-8-6-9-13-19)20-14-10-7-11-15-20/h6-15,18H,5,16-17H2,1-4H3 Key: MCFVCWVAZLRHPN-UHFFFAOYSA-N
- SMILES: CN(C(CC(CCC)(C1=CC=CC=C1)C2=CC=CC=C2)C)C

Properties
Chemical formula	C_{21}H_{29}N
Molar mass	295.470 g·mol^{−1}
- Except where otherwise noted, data are given for materials in their standard state (at 25 °C [77 °F], 100 kPa). Infobox references

Methade, or 6-(dimethylamino)-4,4-diphenylheptane, is the parent compound of the methadone and methadol series of opioid analgesics:

== Chemical derivatives ==
The methade series includes the following compounds:

- Acetylmethadol
  - Alphacetylmethadol
    - Levacetylmethadol
  - Betacetylmethadol)
- Dimepheptanol (or methadol)
  - Alphamethadol
  - Betamethadol
- Methadone
  - Levomethadone
- Noracymethadol
- Normethadone

== Related compounds ==
Some related compounds include:

- Alimadol
- Dextromoramide
- Dextropropoxyphene
- Dimenoxadol
- Dioxaphetyl butyrate
- Dipipanone
- Isomethadone
- Normethadone
- Norpipanone
- Phenadoxone
