= C21H29NO =

The molecular formula C_{21}H_{29}NO (molar mass: 311.46 g/mol) may refer to:

- Alphamethadol
- Betamethadol
- Biperiden
- Dimepheptanol, or methadol
- Isomethadol
- UR-144
- U-41792
