= C23H31NO2 =

The molecular formula C_{23}H_{31}NO_{2} may refer to:

- Acetylmethadol, also known as methadyl acetate
- Alphacetylmethadol
- Betacetylmethadol
- Levacetylmethadol
- Motretinide
- Proadifen
