= C21H29N =

The molecular formula C_{21}H_{29}N (molar mass: 295.46 g/mol, exact mass: 295.2300 u) may refer to:

- Diisopromine, a synthetic spasmolytic
- Methade, a chemical intermediate in opioid synthesis
