= C22H30N2O3 =

The molecular formula C_{22}H_{30}N_{2}O_{3} (molar mass: 370.493 g/mol) may refer to:

- MMB-CHMICA
- NB-5-MeO-DALT
