= 5F-EDMB-PINACA =

Chemical compound

Clinical data
- Other names: 5-Fluoro EDMB-PINACA

Legal status
- Legal status: CA: Schedule II; DE: NpSG (Industrial and scientific use only); UK: Class B; US: Schedule I

Identifiers
- IUPAC name: Ethyl (S)-2-(1-(5-fluoropentyl)-1H-indazole-3-carboxamido)-3,3-dimethylbutanoate
- CAS Number: 2504100-69-8
- PubChem CID: 137700114
- ChemSpider: 68004011
- UNII: UN52BPP7RB
- CompTox Dashboard (EPA): DTXSID50963459

Chemical and physical data
- Formula: C_{21}H_{30}FN_{3}O_{3}
- Molar mass: 391.487 g·mol^{−1}
- 3D model (JSmol): Interactive image
- SMILES: O=C(N[C@H](C(OCC)=O)C(C)(C)C)C1=NN(CCCCCF)C2=C1C=CC=C2
- InChI: InChI=1S/C21H30FN3O3/c1-5-28-20(27)18(21(2,3)4)23-19(26)17-15-11-7-8-12-16(15)25(24-17)14-10-6-9-13-22/h7-8,11-12,18H,5-6,9-10,13-14H2,1-4H3,(H,23,26)/t18-/m1/s1; Key:VDEACSPMBSUVRD-GOSISDBHSA-N

5F-EDMB-PINACA is a designer drug and synthetic cannabinoid. In 2018, it was the fourth-most common synthetic cannabinoid identified in drugs seized by the Drug Enforcement Administration.

In the United States, 5F-EDMB-PINACA was temporarily emergency scheduled by the DEA in 2019. It was made a permanent Schedule I Controlled Substance on April 7, 2022.
