= Fentanyl carbamate =

Chemical compound

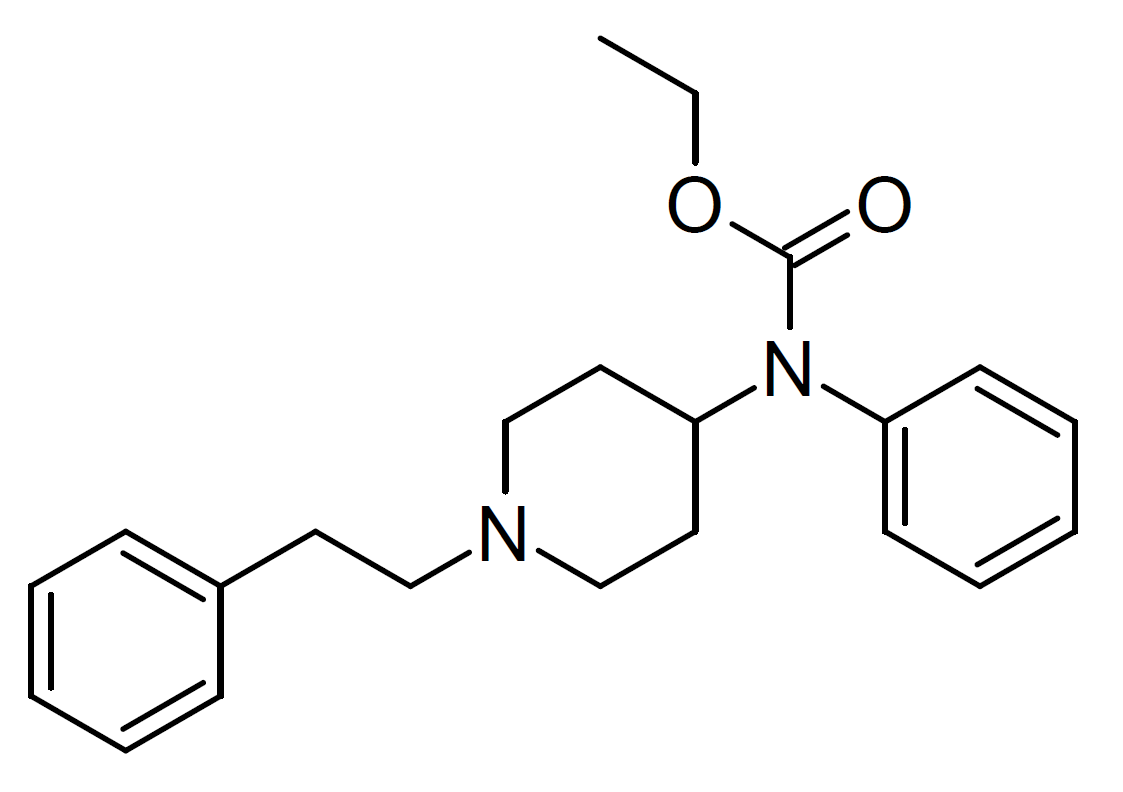

Legal status
- Legal status: US: Schedule I

Identifiers
- IUPAC name: ethyl N-phenyl-N-[1-(2-phenylethyl)piperidin-4-yl]carbamate
- CAS Number: 1465-20-9
- PubChem CID: 44371939
- UNII: S8F1YBT7RG
- CompTox Dashboard (EPA): DTXSID201036723

Chemical and physical data
- Formula: C_{22}H_{28}N_{2}O_{2}
- Molar mass: 352.478 g·mol^{−1}
- 3D model (JSmol): Interactive image
- SMILES: CCOC(=O)N(C1CCN(CC1)CCC2=CC=CC=C2)C3=CC=CC=C3
- InChI: InChI=1S/C22H28N2O2/c1-2-26-22(25)24(20-11-7-4-8-12-20)21-14-17-23(18-15-21)16-13-19-9-5-3-6-10-19/h3-12,21H,2,13-18H2,1H3; Key:BPXVEPWHWMDYCP-UHFFFAOYSA-N

Fentanyl carbamate (Fentanyl ethyl carbamate, Fentanyl ethylformate) is an opioid analgesic that is an analog of fentanyl and has been sold as a designer drug. It has only around 1/10th the potency of fentanyl, but this still makes it a comparatively potent opioid agonist. It falls within the definition of Schedule I drugs in the USA under federal drug analogue legislation, and is specifically listed as a Schedule I drug in North Dakota and Hawaii.

== See also ==
- Methoxyacetylfentanyl
- List of fentanyl analogues
