= Zipeprol =

Cough suppressant drug

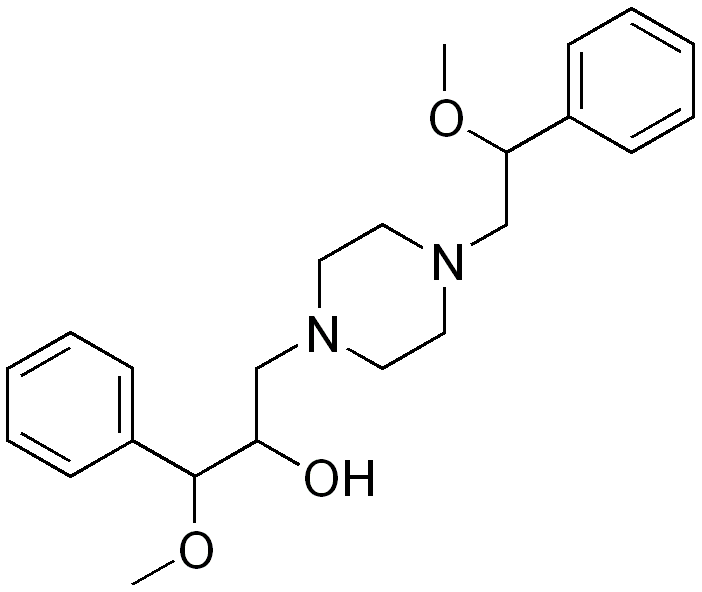

Clinical data
- AHFS/Drugs.com: International Drug Names
- Routes of administration: Oral
- ATC code: R05DB15 (WHO)

Legal status
- Legal status: BR: Class F2 (Prohibited psychotropics); CA: Schedule III; DE: Anlage II (Authorized trade only, not prescriptible); UK: Class B; US: Schedule I; UN: Psychotropic Schedule II

Identifiers
- IUPAC name: 1-methoxy- 3-[4-(2-methoxy- 2-phenylethyl)piperazin- 1-yl]- 1-phenylpropan- 2-ol
- CAS Number: 34758-83-3
- PubChem CID: 36910
- ChemSpider: 33868
- UNII: G5MUV8139H
- KEGG: D07390
- CompTox Dashboard (EPA): DTXSID00865732
- ECHA InfoCard: 100.047.432

Chemical and physical data
- Formula: C_{23}H_{32}N_{2}O_{3}
- Molar mass: 384.520 g·mol^{−1}
- 3D model (JSmol): Interactive image
- SMILES: OC(CN1CCN(CC1)CC(OC)c2ccccc2)C(OC)c3ccccc3
- InChI: InChI=1S/C23H32N2O3/c1-27-22(19-9-5-3-6-10-19)18-25-15-13-24(14-16-25)17-21(26)23(28-2)20-11-7-4-8-12-20/h3-12,21-23,26H,13-18H2,1-2H3; Key:VSTNNAYSCJQCQI-UHFFFAOYSA-N

Zipeprol is a centrally acting cough suppressant developed in France in the 1970s. It is not a morphinan derivative (in contrast to both codeine and dextromethorphan). Zipeprol acts as a local anaesthetic and has mucolytic, antihistamine and anticholinergic properties. It is sold with several brand names such as Zinolta and Respilene. It is not available in the United States or Canada and has been discontinued in Europe. It is still available in some countries in Asia and South America.

Zipeprol has been misused in Korea as a deliriant. Such use is quite dangerous due to the risk of seizures and neurological damage at high dosages.
