= Isomethadol =

Names
- IUPAC name 6-(Dimethylamino)-5-methyl-4,4-diphenyl-3-hexanol

Identifiers
CAS Number	25117-79-7
3D model (JSmol)	Interactive image
ChemSpider	40651
PubChem CID	44676
UNII	56KZ4G2LEF
CompTox Dashboard (EPA)	DTXSID301045317 DTXSID40275472, DTXSID301045317
- InChI: InChI=1S/C21H29NO/c1-5-20(23)21(17(2)16-22(3)4,18-12-8-6-9-13-18)19-14-10-7-11-15-19/h6-15,17,20,23H,5,16H2,1-4H3 Key: UKKMLFPHCPRNJI-UHFFFAOYSA-N; InChI=1/C21H29NO/c1-5-20(23)21(17(2)16-22(3)4,18-12-8-6-9-13-18)19-14-10-7-11-15-19/h6-15,17,20,23H,5,16H2,1-4H3 Key: UKKMLFPHCPRNJI-UHFFFAOYAF
- SMILES: OC(C(c1ccccc1)(c2ccccc2)C(C)CN(C)C)CC

Properties
Chemical formula	C_{21}H_{29}NO
Molar mass	311.461
Melting point	125 to 126 °C (257 to 259 °F; 398 to 399 K)
- Except where otherwise noted, data are given for materials in their standard state (at 25 °C [77 °F], 100 kPa). Infobox references

Isomethadol is an opioid analgesic with a number of stereoisomers (viz. alpha and beta forms of dextro, laevo, and racemic isomers for a total of six) produced by the reduction of d,l-isomethadone with lithium aluminium hydride. It was first produced in the United States in 1948. The salt used in research is the hydrochloride.
