= U-41792 =

Antihyperlipidemic agent

Identifiers
- IUPAC name: 1-[4-(1-adamantyloxy)phenyl]piperidine
- CAS Number: 56714-70-6
- PubChem CID: 64390
- ChemSpider: 57960
- ChEMBL: ChEMBL3228507
- CompTox Dashboard (EPA): DTXSID70972164

Chemical and physical data
- Formula: C_{21}H_{29}NO
- Molar mass: 311.469 g·mol^{−1}
- 3D model (JSmol): Interactive image
- SMILES: C1CCN(CC1)C2=CC=C(C=C2)OC34CC5CC(C3)CC(C5)C4
- InChI: InChI=1S/C21H29NO/c1-2-8-22(9-3-1)19-4-6-20(7-5-19)23-21-13-16-10-17(14-21)12-18(11-16)15-21/h4-7,16-18H,1-3,8-15H2; Key:NMFLMLJPBJHWSE-UHFFFAOYSA-N

U-41792 is a small molecule developed by the Upjohn Company as a hypobetalipoproteinemic agent, meaning it lowers levels of beta-lipoproteins, including low-density lipoprotein (LDL) such as apolipoprotein B, in the blood. Elevated LDL levels can lead to early-onset atherosclerosis and increase the risk of heart problems.

U-41792 demonstrated its ability to reduce lipid levels in hyperlipemic rats.

== Synthesis ==
In order to synthesize U-41792, the alcohol of adamantane called 1-adamantanol is reacted with sodium to generate its corresponding alkoxide. This alkoxide then undergoes a nucleophilic aromatic substitution on p-fluoronitrobenzene to form the corresponding ether. This nitro group is then reduced and alkylated to give U-41792.
