= Dioxaphetyl butyrate =

Chemical compound

Clinical data
- Other names: Amidalgon, Spasmoxal
- Routes of administration: Oral, Other ROA Unknown
- ATC code: none

Legal status
- Legal status: AU: S9 (Prohibited substance); BR: Class A1 (Narcotic drugs); CA: Schedule I; DE: Anlage I (Authorized scientific use only); US: Schedule I

Identifiers
- IUPAC name: Ethyl 4-morpholin-4-yl-2,2-di(phenyl)butanoate
- CAS Number: 467-86-7
- PubChem CID: 48194
- DrugBank: DB01475
- ChemSpider: 43838
- UNII: G751H98FY4
- KEGG: D12699
- CompTox Dashboard (EPA): DTXSID20196914
- ECHA InfoCard: 100.006.731

Chemical and physical data
- Formula: C_{22}H_{27}NO_{3}
- Molar mass: 353.462 g·mol^{−1}
- 3D model (JSmol): Interactive image
- SMILES: CCOC(=O)C(CCN1CCOCC1)(c1ccccc1)c1ccccc1
- InChI: InChI=1S/C22H27NO3/c1-2-26-21(24)22(19-9-5-3-6-10-19,20-11-7-4-8-12-20)13-14-23-15-17-25-18-16-23/h3-12H,2,13-18H2,1H3; Key:LQGIXNQCOXNCRP-UHFFFAOYSA-N

Dioxaphetyl butyrate (INN; trade names Amidalgon, Spasmoxal) is an opioid analgesic which is a diphenylacetic acid derivative, related to other open-chain opioid drugs such as dextropropoxyphene, levacetylmethadol (LAAM), lefetamine and dimenoxadol.

It produces similar effects to other opioids, including dependence, euphoria, analgesia, sedation, constipation, dizziness and nausea.

== Legal status ==
Dioxaphetyl butyrate is listed as an internationally controlled opioid under Schedule I of the 1961 Single Convention on Narcotic Drugs.[ref]

In Australia, the Office of Drug Control lists it as a narcotic requiring import and export licensing and permits.

In the United States it is a Schedule I Narcotic controlled substance with an ACSCN of 9621 and a 2013 annual aggregate manufacturing quota of zero.

== Chemistry ==
Dioxaphetyl butyrate has the molecular formula C22H27NO3 and a molecular weight of approximately 353.45 g/mol. Its IUPAC name is ethyl 4-(morpholin-4-yl)-2,2-diphenylbutanoate. It is also listed under the names Amidalgon and Spasmoxal.
