= Properidine =

Chemical compound

Clinical data
- Other names: Ipropethidine
- ATC code: none

Legal status
- Legal status: AU: S9 (Prohibited substance); BR: Class A1 (Narcotic drugs); CA: Schedule I; DE: Anlage I (Authorized scientific use only); UK: Class A; US: Schedule I; UN: Psychotropic Schedule I

Identifiers
- IUPAC name: isopropyl 1-methyl-4-phenylpiperidine-4-carboxylate
- CAS Number: 561-76-2
- PubChem CID: 62373
- ChemSpider: 56161
- UNII: R1493W1CJ0
- KEGG: D13025
- CompTox Dashboard (EPA): DTXSID20204644
- ECHA InfoCard: 100.008.385

Chemical and physical data
- Formula: C_{16}H_{23}NO_{2}
- Molar mass: 261.365 g·mol^{−1}
- 3D model (JSmol): Interactive image
- SMILES: O=C(OC(C)C)C2(c1ccccc1)CCN(C)CC2
- InChI: InChI=1S/C16H23NO2/c1-13(2)19-15(18)16(9-11-17(3)12-10-16)14-7-5-4-6-8-14/h4-8,13H,9-12H2,1-3H3; Key:XJKQCILVUHXVIQ-UHFFFAOYSA-N

Properidine is an opioid, an analgesic, and the isopropyl analog of pethidine. Properidine is under international control and is listed in the United States under the Controlled Substances Act (1970) as a Schedule I substance. It is a narcotic, with an Administrative Controlled Substances Code Number (ACSCN) of 9644 and a 2 gramme annual aggregate manufacturing quota as of 2014. The salt in use is hydrochloride, with a free base conversion ratio of 0.88.
