= Trimeperidine =

Analgesic drug

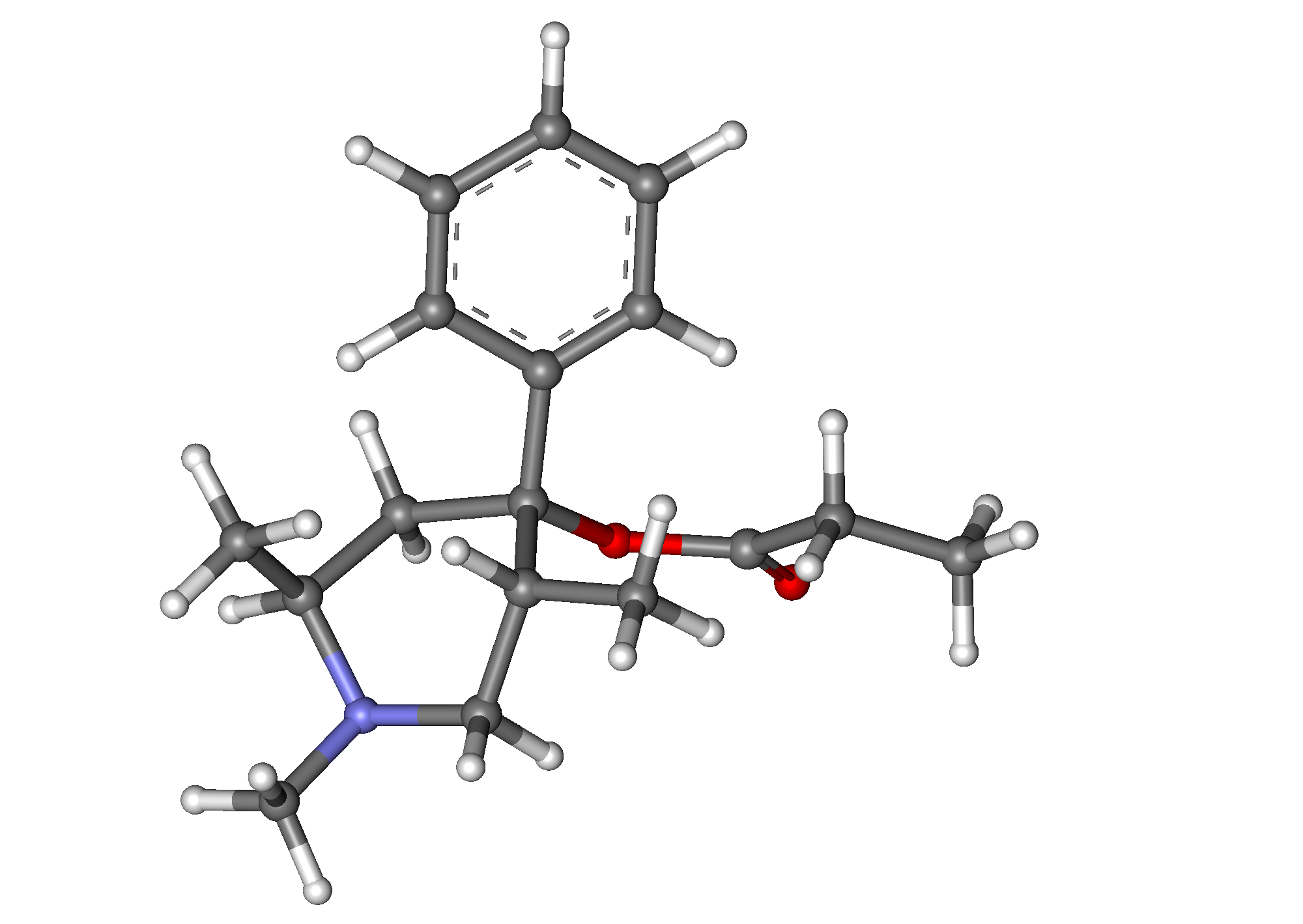

Clinical data
- Trade names: Promedol
- AHFS/Drugs.com: International Drug Names
- Drug class: Opioid
- ATC code: N02AB04 (WHO)

Legal status
- Legal status: AU: S9 (Prohibited substance); BR: Class A1 (Narcotic drugs); CA: Schedule I; DE: Anlage I (Authorized scientific use only); UK: Class A; US: Schedule I

Identifiers
- IUPAC name: (2S,5R)-1,2,5-Trimethyl-4-phenylpiperidin-4-yl propionate
- CAS Number: 29606-10-8
- PubChem CID: 6148
- ChemSpider: 16736164
- UNII: 1M2IB31DTS
- KEGG: D06268
- CompTox Dashboard (EPA): DTXSID501018271
- ECHA InfoCard: 100.000.531

Chemical and physical data
- Formula: C_{17}H_{25}NO_{2}
- Molar mass: 275.392 g·mol^{−1}
- 3D model (JSmol): Interactive image
- SMILES: C[C@@H]1CN(C)[C@@H](C)C[C@@]1(OC(=O)CC)c2ccccc2
- InChI: InChI=1S/C17H25NO2/c1-5-16(19)20-17(15-9-7-6-8-10-15)11-14(3)18(4)12-13(17)2/h6-10,13-14H,5,11-12H2,1-4H3/t13-,14+,17+/m1/s1; Key:UVITTYOJFDLOGI-KEYYUXOJSA-N

Trimeperidine, sold under the brand name Promedol, is an opioid analgesic that is an analogue of prodine. It was developed in the early 1950s in the Soviet Union during research into the related drug pethidine.

Trimeperidine has four structural isomers, of which two are active, the γ isomer trimeperidine, and the β isomer isopromedol. It is around half the potency of morphine as an analgesic, and has been widely used for the treatment of pain.

Trimeperidine produces similar effects to other opioids, such as analgesia and sedation, along with side effects such as nausea, itching, vomiting, and respiratory depression, which may be harmful or fatal.

Trimeperidine is in Schedule I of the Controlled Substances Act 1970 of the United States as a Narcotic with ACSCN 9646 with an annual aggregate manufacturing quota of 2 grams as of 2014. The free base conversion ratio for salts includes 0.883 for the hydrochloride. Trimeperidine increases the activity of the reticular activating system in the brain. It is listed under the Single Convention for the Control of Narcotic Substances 1961 and is controlled in most countries in the same fashion, as is morphine or heroin.

Promedol is included into the standard medication kit, which is carried on the battlefield by every Russian military personnel, as a pain-killer in case of wounding.

== See also ==
- List of Russian drugs
