= Noracymethadol =

Chemical compound

Clinical data
- ATC code: None

Legal status
- Legal status: BR: Class A1 (Narcotic drugs); CA: Schedule I; DE: Anlage I (Authorized scientific use only); US: Schedule I

Identifiers
- IUPAC name: 6-(Methylamino)-4,4-diphenyl-3-heptanyl acetate
- CAS Number: 1477-39-0 5633-25-0 (hydrochloride) 7645-01-4 (gluconate)
- PubChem CID: 15129
- ChemSpider: 14400
- UNII: KU5U13XY7J
- KEGG: D05203
- CompTox Dashboard (EPA): DTXSID30860679
- ECHA InfoCard: 100.014.571

Chemical and physical data
- Formula: C_{22}H_{29}NO_{2}
- Molar mass: 339.479 g·mol^{−1}
- 3D model (JSmol): Interactive image
- SMILES: O=C(OC(C(c1ccccc1)(c2ccccc2)CC(NC)C)CC)C
- InChI: InChI=1S/C22H29NO2/c1-5-21(25-18(3)24)22(16-17(2)23-4,19-12-8-6-9-13-19)20-14-10-7-11-15-20/h6-15,17,21,23H,5,16H2,1-4H3; Key:VWCUGCYZZGRKEE-UHFFFAOYSA-N

Noracymethadol (INN) is a synthetic opioid analgesic related to methadone that was never marketed. In a clinical trial of postpartum patients it was reported to produce analgesia comparable to that of morphine but with less nausea, dizziness, and drowsiness. Other side effects included salivation, ataxia, and respiratory depression that was reversible by naloxone. Similarly to many of its analogues, noracymethadol is a Schedule I controlled substance in the United States with an ACSCN of 9633 and 2013 annual manufacturing quota of 12 grammes. and is also controlled internationally under the United Nations Single Convention on Narcotic Drugs of 1961. The salts known are the gluconate (free base conversion ratio 0.633) and hydrochloride (0.903).

Noracymethadol is an acetate ester of methadol and it can be said with some precision that it is either the heroin or 6-monoacetylmorphine analogue of methadol, and being a methadol it exhibits optical isomerism. The other methadols (acetylmethadol, methadol &c) have at least four optical isomers (see Orlaam).

== See also ==
- Acetylmethadol
- Dimepheptanol (methadol)
