= Piritramide =

Synthetic opioid

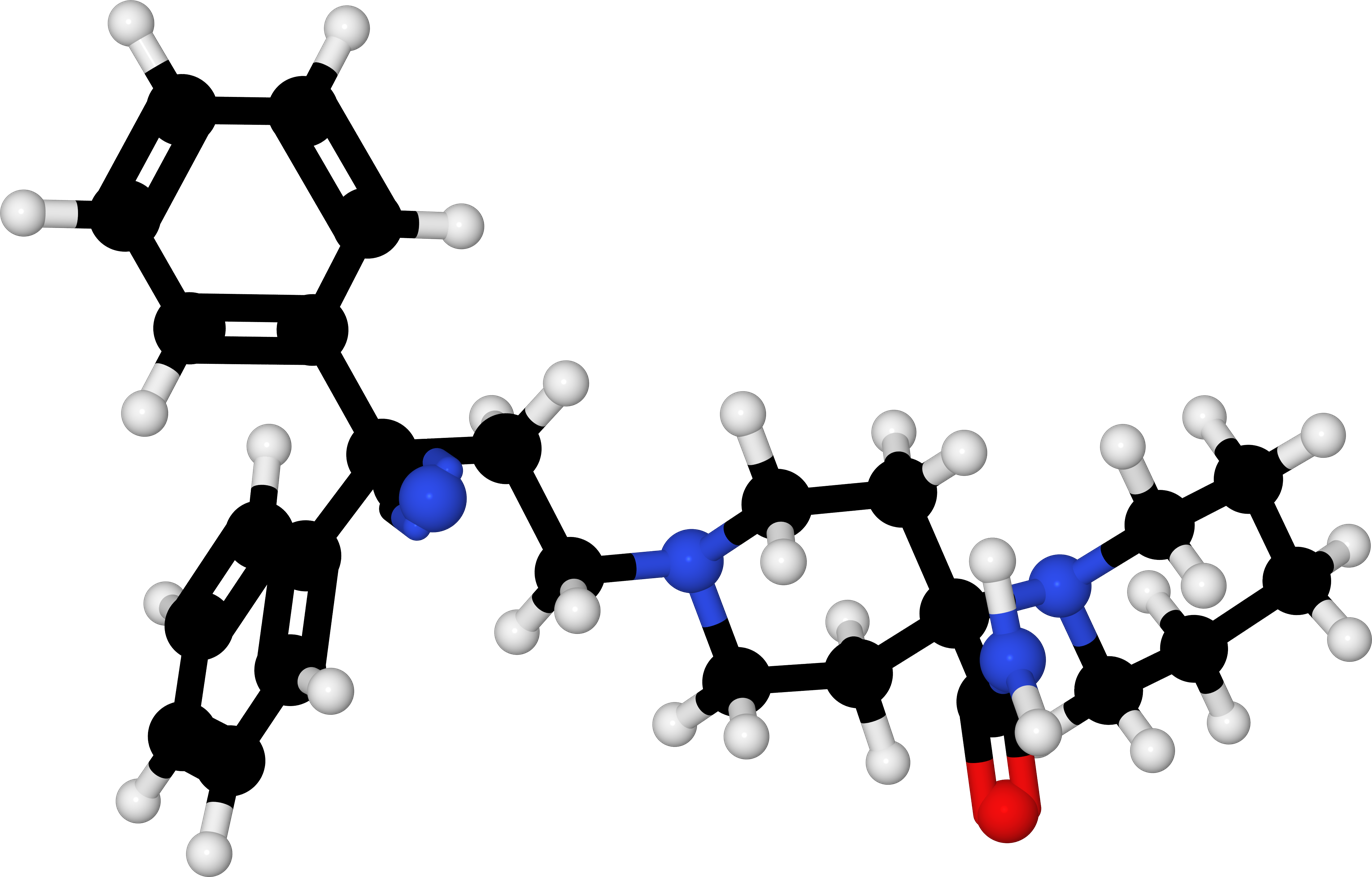

Clinical data
- Trade names: Dipidolor
- AHFS/Drugs.com: International Drug Names
- Pregnancy category: No teratogenic effects in preclinical studies; but, as with other opioids it may cause reversible adverse effects in the newborn.
- Routes of administration: Oral, IM, IV
- ATC code: N02AC03 (WHO)

Legal status
- Legal status: AU: S8 (Controlled drug); BR: Class A1 (Narcotic drugs); CA: Schedule I; DE: Anlage III (Special prescription form required); US: Schedule I

Pharmacokinetic data
- Protein binding: 95%
- Metabolism: Liver
- Elimination half-life: 4-10 hours (acute dosing), 17.4 hours (chronic dosing)

Identifiers
- IUPAC name: 1-(3-cyano-3,3-diphenylpropyl)-4-(piperidin-1-yl)piperidine-4-carboxamide
- CAS Number: 302-41-0
- PubChem CID: 9331
- DrugBank: DB12492
- ChemSpider: 8967
- UNII: 4RP92LYZ2F
- KEGG: D07288
- ChEMBL: ChEMBL559288
- CompTox Dashboard (EPA): DTXSID00184293
- ECHA InfoCard: 100.005.569

Chemical and physical data
- Formula: C_{27}H_{34}N_{4}O
- Molar mass: 430.596 g·mol^{−1}
- 3D model (JSmol): Interactive image
- SMILES: N#CC(C1=CC=CC=C1)(CCN2CCC(N3CCCCC3)(CC2)C(N)=O)C4=CC=CC=C4
- InChI: InChI=1S/C27H34N4O/c28-22-26(23-10-4-1-5-11-23,24-12-6-2-7-13-24)14-19-30-20-15-27(16-21-30,25(29)32)31-17-8-3-9-18-31/h1-2,4-7,10-13H,3,8-9,14-21H2,(H2,29,32); Key:IHEHEFLXQFOQJO-UHFFFAOYSA-N

Piritramide (R-3365, trade names Dipidolor, Piridolan, Pirium and others) is a synthetic opioid analgesic (narcotic painkiller) that is marketed in certain European countries including: Austria, Belgium, Czech Republic, Slovenia, Germany and the Netherlands. It comes in free form, is about 0.75x times as potent as morphine and is given parenterally (by injection) for the treatment of severe pain. Nausea, vomiting, respiratory depression and constipation are believed to be less frequent with piritramide than with morphine (the gold standard opioid against which other opioids are compared and contrasted), and it produces more rapid-onset analgesia (pain relief) when compared to morphine and pethidine. After intravenous administration the onset of analgesia is as little as 1–2 minutes, which may be related to its great lipophilicity. The analgesic and sedative effects of piritramide are believed to be potentiated with phenothiazines and its emetic (nausea/vomiting-inducing) effects are suppressed. The volume of distribution is 0.7-1 L/kg after a single dose, 4.7-6 L/kg after steady-state concentrations are achieved and up to 11.1 L/kg after prolonged dosing.

Piritramide was developed and patented in Belgium, at Janssen, in 1960. It is part of an eponymous two-member class of opioids in clinical use with the other being bezitramide (Burgodin). The closest chemical and structural relatives of piritramide in clinical use include the diphenoxylate family, fentanyl (both Janssen discoveries) and somewhat more distantly alphaprodine.

Not being in clinical use in the United States, it is a Schedule I Narcotic controlled substance with a DEA ACSCN of 9642 and manufacturing quota of zero.
