= Normethadone =

Synthetic opioid

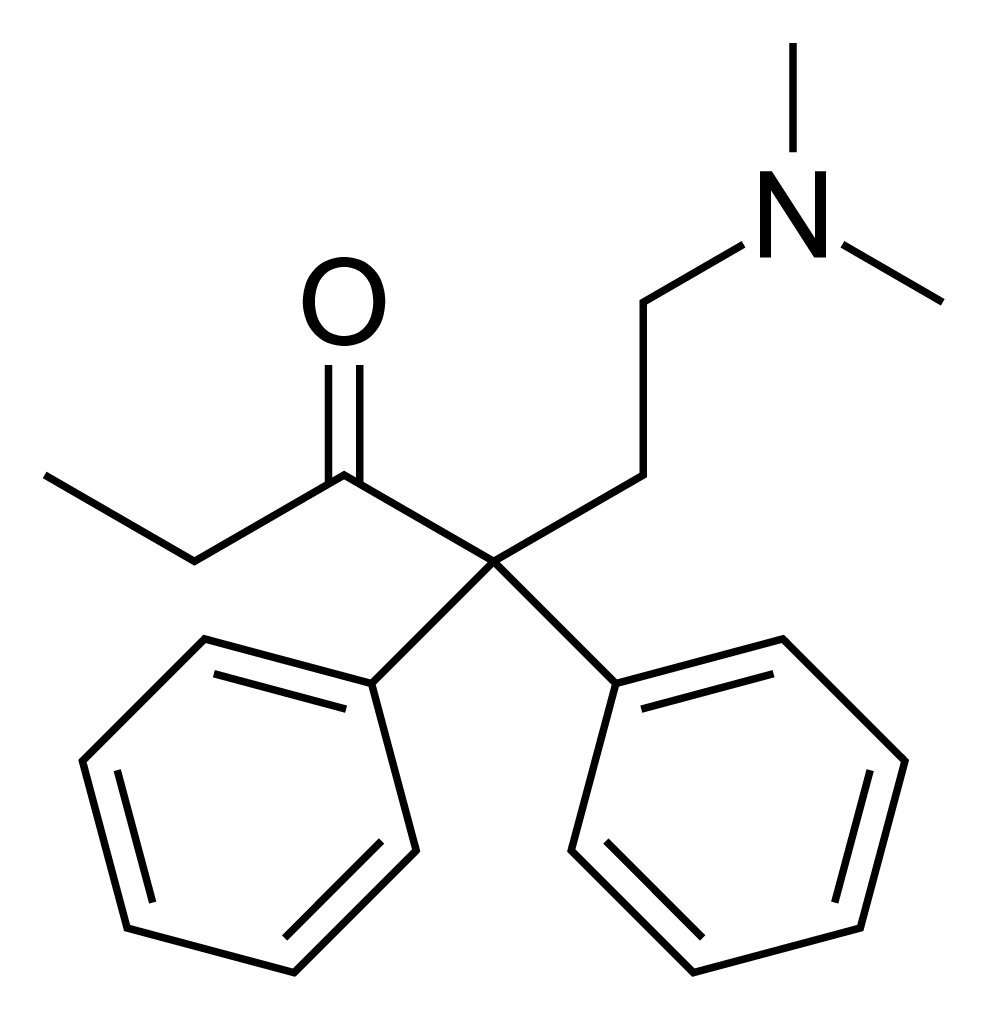

Clinical data
- Trade names: Cophylac
- ATC code: R05DA06 (WHO)

Legal status
- Legal status: AU: S9 (Prohibited substance); BR: Class A1 (Narcotic drugs); CA: Schedule I; DE: Anlage III (Special prescription form required); US: Schedule I

Identifiers
- IUPAC name: 6-dimethylamino-4,4-diphenyl-hexan-3-one
- CAS Number: 467-85-6 847-84-7 (HCl)
- PubChem CID: 10090
- ChemSpider: 9687
- UNII: KR2L2A68XL
- KEGG: D07384
- ChEMBL: ChEMBL346331
- CompTox Dashboard (EPA): DTXSID6057748
- ECHA InfoCard: 100.006.730

Chemical and physical data
- Formula: C_{20}H_{25}NO
- Molar mass: 295.426 g·mol^{−1}
- 3D model (JSmol): Interactive image
- SMILES: O=C(C(c1ccccc1)(c2ccccc2)CCN(C)C)CC
- InChI: InChI=1S/C20H25NO/c1-4-19(22)20(15-16-21(2)3,17-11-7-5-8-12-17)18-13-9-6-10-14-18/h5-14H,4,15-16H2,1-3H3; Key:WCJFBSYALHQBSK-UHFFFAOYSA-N

Normethadone (INN, BAN; brand names Ticarda, Cophylac, Dacartil, Eucopon, Mepidon, Noramidone, Normedon, and others), also known as desmethylmethadone or phenyldimazone, is a synthetic opioid analgesic and antitussive agent. Normethadone is listed under the Single Convention on Narcotic Drugs 1961 and is a Schedule I Narcotic controlled substance in the United States, with a DEA ACSCN of 9635 and an annual manufacturing quota of 2 grams. The salts in use are the hydrobromide (free base conversion ratio 0.785), hydrochloride (0.890), methyliodide (0.675), oxalate (0.766), picrate (0.563), and the 2,6-ditertbutylnapthalindisulphonate (0.480).

== See also ==
- Methade
