= MMB-CHMICA =

Chemical compound

Clinical data
- Other names: AMB-CHMICA

Legal status
- Legal status: CA: Schedule II; DE: NpSG (Industrial and scientific use only); UK: Under Psychoactive Substances Act; US: Schedule I

Identifiers
- IUPAC name: Methyl N-{[1-(cyclohexylmethyl)-1H-indol-3-yl]carbonyl}-L-valinate
- CAS Number: 1971007-94-9
- ChemSpider: 68896113
- UNII: HEN6ZCR7GD
- CompTox Dashboard (EPA): DTXSID301009991

Chemical and physical data
- Formula: C_{22}H_{30}N_{2}O_{3}
- Molar mass: 370.493 g·mol^{−1}
- 3D model (JSmol): Interactive image
- SMILES: CC(C)[C@@H](C(=O)OC)NC(=O)c1cn(c2c1cccc2)CC3CCCCC3
- InChI: InChI=1S/C22H30N2O3/c1-15(2)20(22(26)27-3)23-21(25)18-14-24(13-16-9-5-4-6-10-16)19-12-8-7-11-17(18)19/h7-8,11-12,14-16,20H,4-6,9-10,13H2,1-3H3,(H,23,25)/t20-/m0/s1; Key:ROWZIXRLVUOMCJ-FQEVSTJZSA-N

MMB-CHMICA (AMB-CHMICA) is a designer drug and synthetic cannabinoid. In 2018, it was the sixth-most common synthetic cannabinoid identified in drugs seized by the Drug Enforcement Administration.
