= Dimethylthiambutene =

Chemical compound

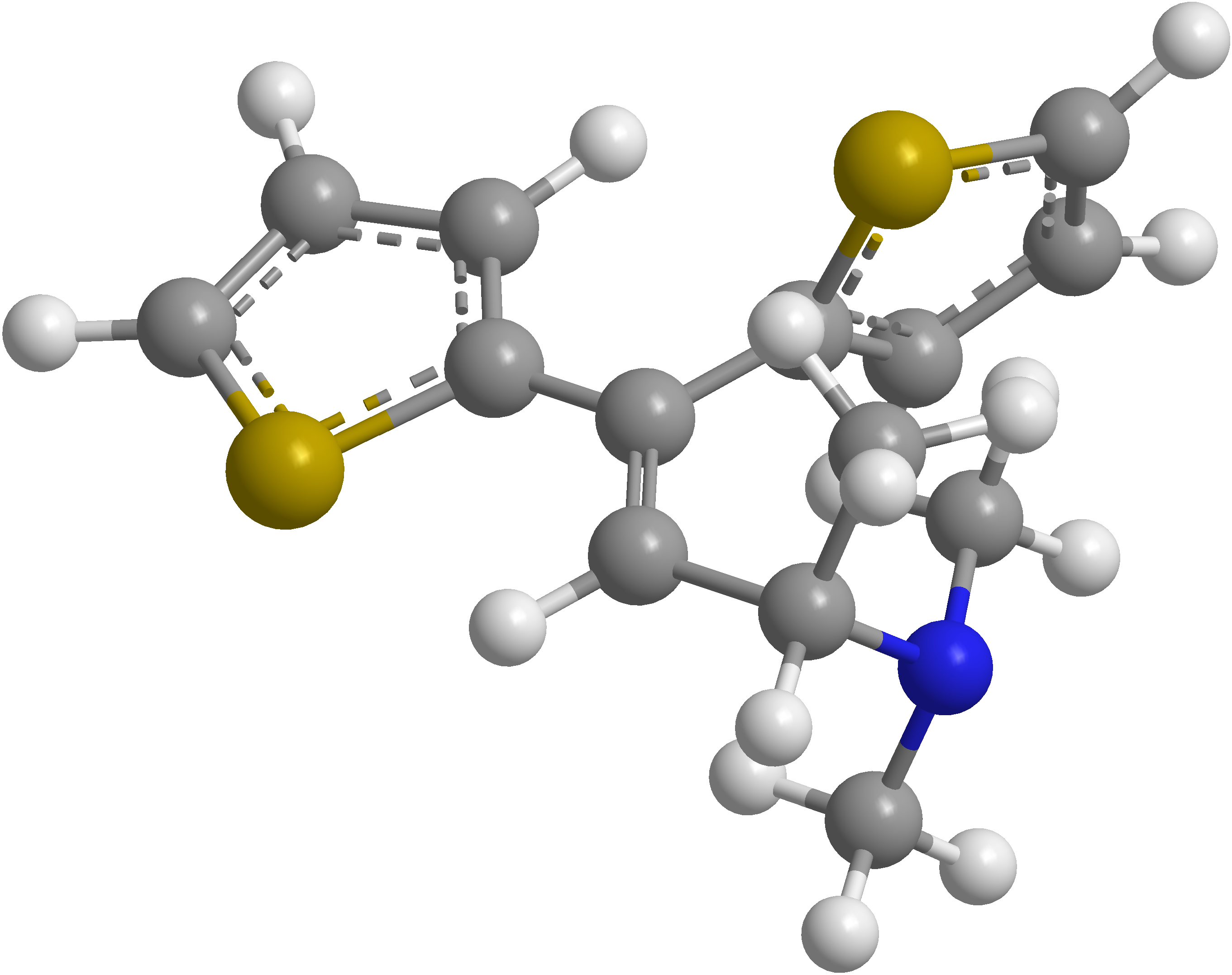

Clinical data
- ATC code: none

Legal status
- Legal status: BR: Class A1 (Narcotic drugs); CA: Schedule I; DE: Anlage I (Authorized scientific use only); US: Schedule I

Identifiers
- IUPAC name: (RS)-N,N-dimethyl-4,4-dithiophen-2-yl-but-3-en-2-amine
- CAS Number: 524-84-5
- PubChem CID: 10668
- DrugBank: DB01444
- ChemSpider: 10218
- UNII: 915D88LM9O
- KEGG: D12665
- ChEBI: CHEBI:59781
- ChEMBL: ChEMBL2106265
- CompTox Dashboard (EPA): DTXSID50862115

Chemical and physical data
- Formula: C_{14}H_{17}NS_{2}
- Molar mass: 263.42 g·mol^{−1}
- 3D model (JSmol): Interactive image
- Melting point: 169 to 170 °C (336 to 338 °F)
- SMILES: CC(C=C(C1=CC=CS1)C2=CC=CS2)N(C)C
- InChI: InChI=1S/C14H17NS2/c1-11(15(2)3)10-12(13-6-4-8-16-13)14-7-5-9-17-14/h4-11H,1-3H3; Key:CANBGVXYBPOLRR-UHFFFAOYSA-N

Dimethylthiambutene (N,N-Dimethyl-1-methyl-3,3-di-2-thienylallylamine, DMTB, trade names Ohton, Aminobutene, Dimethibutin, Kobaton, Takaton, Dimethibutin) is an opioid analgesic drug, most often used in veterinary medicine in Japan and to a lesser extent in other countries in the region and around the world. It is the most prominent and widely used of the thiambutenes, a series of open-chain opioids structurally related to methadone which are also called the thienyl derivative opioids which also includes diethylthiambutene and ethylmethylthiambutene, as well as the non-opioid cough suppressant tipepidine.

Dimethylthiambutene was developed in the United Kingdom in the late 1940s and introduced to the market by Burroughs-Wellcome in 1951. Dimethylthiambutene is now under international control under the UN Single Convention on Narcotic Drugs 1961, the laws governing habit-forming substances in virtually all countries and Schedule I of the US Controlled Substances Act of 1970 due to high abuse potential and never being introduced clinically in the United States; other countries regulate it much as morphine or diamorphine. Its DEA ACSCN is 9619 and it had a zero manufacturing quota in 2013.

== Synthesis ==
Synthesis: Patent:

The conjugate addition between Ethyl crotonate [623-70-1][10544-63-5] (1) and dimethylamine gives Ethyl 3-(Dimethylamino)Butanoate [85118-28-1] (2). Grignard reaction with 2-Bromothiophene [1003-09-4] (3) gives (4). Dehydration in acid completed the synthesis (5).

== See also ==
- Diethylthiambutene
- Tipepidine
