= Normorphine =

Chemical compound

Clinical data
- Other names: Normorphine
- Dependence liability: High
- ATC code: none

Legal status
- Legal status: AU: S9 (Prohibited substance); BR: Class A1 (Narcotic drugs); CA: Schedule I; DE: Anlage I (Authorized scientific use only); US: Schedule I

Identifiers
- IUPAC name: 3,6α-Dihydroxy-4,5α-epoxy-7,8-didehydromorphinan
- CAS Number: 466-97-7
- PubChem CID: 5462508
- IUPHAR/BPS: 1630
- ChemSpider: 4575435
- UNII: XUI1Y24IMI
- KEGG: C11785
- ChEMBL: ChEMBL1227
- CompTox Dashboard (EPA): DTXSID1049019
- ECHA InfoCard: 100.006.712

Chemical and physical data
- Formula: C_{16}H_{17}NO_{3}
- Molar mass: 271.316 g·mol^{−1}
- 3D model (JSmol): Interactive image
- SMILES: c1cc(c2c3c1C[C@@H]4[C@H]5[C@]3(CCN4)[C@@H](O2)[C@H](C=C5)O)O
- InChI: InChI=1S/C16H17NO3/c18-11-3-1-8-7-10-9-2-4-12(19)15-16(9,5-6-17-10)13(8)14(11)20-15/h1-4,9-10,12,15,17-19H,5-7H2/t9-,10+,12-,15-,16-/m0/s1; Key:ONBWJWYUHXVEJS-ZTYRTETDSA-N

Normorphine is an opiate analogue, the N-demethylated derivative of morphine, that was first described in the 1950s when a large group of N-substituted morphine analogues were characterized for activity. The compound has relatively little opioid activity in its own right, but is a useful intermediate which can be used to produce both opioid antagonists such as nalorphine, and also potent opioid agonists such as N-phenethylnormorphine. with its formation from morphine catalyzed by the liver enzymes CYP3A4 and CYP2C8.

Normorphine is a controlled substance listed under the Single Convention On Narcotic Drugs 1961 and the laws in various states implementing it; for example, in the United States it is a Schedule I Narcotic controlled substance, with an ACSCN of 9313 and an annual aggregate manufacturing quota of 18 grams in 2014, unchanged from the prior year. The salts in use are the free base hexahydrate (free base conversion ratio 0.715), and hydrochloride (0.833).
