= Drotebanol =

Chemical compound

Clinical data
- Other names: Drotebanol, Oxymethebanol
- AHFS/Drugs.com: International Drug Names
- ATC code: none

Legal status
- Legal status: AU: S8 (Controlled drug); BR: Class A1 (Narcotic drugs); CA: Schedule I; DE: Anlage I (Authorized scientific use only); US: Schedule I; SE: Förteckning II

Identifiers
- IUPAC name: 3,4-Dimethoxy-17-methylmorphinan-6β,14-diol
- CAS Number: 3176-03-2
- PubChem CID: 5463863
- DrugBank: DB01547
- ChemSpider: 16736125
- UNII: 7RS2Q8MCK8
- KEGG: D01496
- ChEMBL: ChEMBL2104603
- CompTox Dashboard (EPA): DTXSID301017908

Chemical and physical data
- Formula: C_{19}H_{27}NO_{4}
- Molar mass: 333.428 g·mol^{−1}
- 3D model (JSmol): Interactive image
- Melting point: 165 to 167 °C (329 to 333 °F)
- SMILES: CN1CC[C@]23C[C@@H](CC[C@]2([C@H]1CC4=C3C(=C(C=C4)OC)OC)O)O
- InChI: InChI=1S/C19H27NO4/c1-20-9-8-18-11-13(21)6-7-19(18,22)15(20)10-12-4-5-14(23-2)17(24-3)16(12)18/h4-5,13,15,21-22H,6-11H2,1-3H3/t13-,15-,18-,19-/m1/s1; Key:LCAHPIFLPICNRW-SVYNMNNPSA-N

Drotebanol (Oxymethebanol) is a morphinan derivative that acts as an opioid agonist. It was invented by Sankyo Company in Japan during the 1970s. It is synthesised from thebaine.

Drotebanol has powerful antitussive (cough suppressant) effects, and is around 10x more potent than codeine in producing this effect. It also has analgesic effects several times stronger than codeine, but weaker than morphine. In animal studies it was found to be moderately addictive and produced limited physical dependence, but not as severe as that seen with morphine or pethidine. It was previously marketed for human use under the brand name Metebanyl, although it is now no longer used in medicine.

It is currently a Schedule I Narcotic controlled substance in the United States with a DEA ACSCN of 9335 and an annual aggregate manufacturing quota of zero.
