= Betacetylmethadol =

Synthetic opioid drug

Clinical data
- ATC code: None

Legal status
- Legal status: AU: S9 (Prohibited substance); BR: Class A1 (Narcotic drugs); CA: Schedule I; DE: Anlage I (Authorized scientific use only); US: Schedule I

Identifiers
- IUPAC name: (3S,6R)-6-(dimethylamino)-4,4-diphenyl-3-heptanyl acetate
- CAS Number: 17199-59-6
- PubChem CID: 62710
- DrugBank: DB01522
- ChemSpider: 56457
- UNII: 905GLN509G
- KEGG: D12661
- ChEMBL: ChEMBL2105619
- CompTox Dashboard (EPA): DTXSID30169199

Chemical and physical data
- Formula: C_{23}H_{31}NO_{2}
- Molar mass: 353.506 g·mol^{−1}
- 3D model (JSmol): Interactive image
- SMILES: O=C(O[C@H](C(c1ccccc1)(c2ccccc2)C[C@H](N(C)C)C)CC)C
- InChI: InChI=1S/C23H31NO2/c1-6-22(26-19(3)25)23(17-18(2)24(4)5,20-13-9-7-10-14-20)21-15-11-8-12-16-21/h7-16,18,22H,6,17H2,1-5H3/t18-,22+/m1/s1; Key:XBMIVRRWGCYBTQ-GCJKJVERSA-N

Betacetylmethadol is a synthetic opioid. It is a diastereoisomer of alphacetylmethadol (as well as levacetylmethadol). In the United States, betacetylmethadol is a Schedule I drug Narcotic under the Controlled Substances Act, with an ACSCN of 9607 and a 2 gramme manufacturing quota as of 2014.

== See also ==
- Acetylmethadol
- Alphacetylmethadol
- Levacetylmethadol
- Betamethadol
