= Alphacetylmethadol =

Synthetic opioid analgesic drug

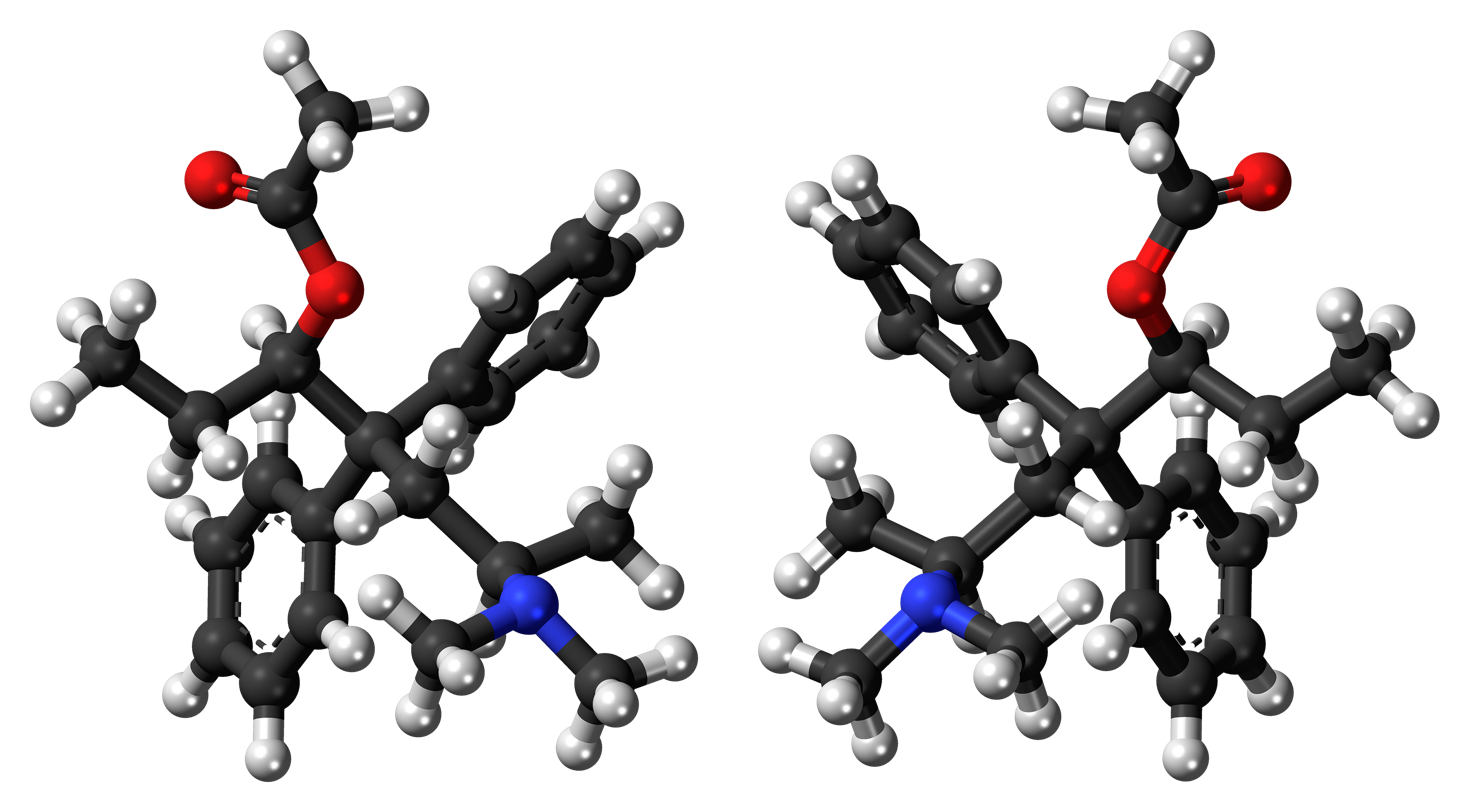

Clinical data
- ATC code: None

Legal status
- Legal status: AU: S8 (Controlled drug); BR: Class A1 (Narcotic drugs); CA: Schedule I; DE: Anlage I (Authorized scientific use only); US: Schedule I

Identifiers
- IUPAC name: [(3R,6R)-6-(Dimethylamino)-4,4-diphenylheptan-3-yl] acetate
- CAS Number: 17199-58-5
- PubChem CID: 22308
- DrugBank: DB01555
- ChemSpider: 20937
- UNII: BXF83S0HEL
- KEGG: D12660
- ChEMBL: ChEMBL2107793
- CompTox Dashboard (EPA): DTXSID70169198

Chemical and physical data
- Formula: C_{23}H_{31}NO_{2}
- Molar mass: 353.506 g·mol^{−1}
- 3D model (JSmol): Interactive image
- SMILES: CC[C@H](C(C[C@@H](C)N(C)C)(C1=CC=CC=C1)C2=CC=CC=C2)OC(=O)C
- InChI: InChI=1S/C23H31NO2/c1-6-22(26-19(3)25)23(17-18(2)24(4)5,20-13-9-7-10-14-20)21-15-11-8-12-16-21/h7-16,18,22H,6,17H2,1-5H3/t18-,22-/m1/s1; Key:XBMIVRRWGCYBTQ-XMSQKQJNSA-N

Alphacetylmethadol (INN), or α-acetylmethadol (AAM), is a synthetic opioid analgesic. Its levorotary enantiomer, levacetylmethadol, is an FDA-approved treatment for opioid addiction; however as of 2003 it is no longer used in the United States for this purpose. Alphacetylmethadol is very similar in structure to methadone, a widely prescribed treatment for opioid addiction. In the United States, it is a Schedule I controlled substance under the Controlled Substances Act (presumably because it was never marketed in the US, as is the case with other common opiate/opioid medications such as heroin and prodine), with an ACSCN of 9603 and a 2013 annual manufacturing quota of 2 grammes.

== See also ==
- Levacetylmethadol
- Acetylmethadol
- Betacetylmethadol
- Alphamethadol
