= Alphamethadol =

Synthetic opioid analgesic drug

Clinical data
- ATC code: None

Legal status
- Legal status: AU: S9 (Prohibited substance); BR: Class A1 (Narcotic drugs); CA: Schedule I; DE: Anlage I (Authorized scientific use only); UK: Class A; US: Schedule I

Identifiers
- IUPAC name: (3R,6R)-6-(dimethylamino)-4,4-diphenyl-3-heptanol
- CAS Number: 17199-54-1
- PubChem CID: 62709
- DrugBank: DB01498
- ChemSpider: 56456
- UNII: XBD99QNI42
- KEGG: D12674
- ChEMBL: ChEMBL159660
- CompTox Dashboard (EPA): DTXSID60872467

Chemical and physical data
- Formula: C_{21}H_{29}NO
- Molar mass: 311.469 g·mol^{−1}
- 3D model (JSmol): Interactive image
- SMILES: O[C@@H](C(c1ccccc1)(c2ccccc2)C[C@H](N(C)C)C)CC
- InChI: InChI=1S/C21H29NO/c1-5-20(23)21(16-17(2)22(3)4,18-12-8-6-9-13-18)19-14-10-7-11-15-19/h6-15,17,20,23H,5,16H2,1-4H3/t17-,20-/m1/s1; Key:QIRAYNIFEOXSPW-YLJYHZDGSA-N

Alphamethadol (INN), or α-methadol, also known as alfametadol, is a synthetic opioid analgesic. It is an isomer of dimepheptanol (methadol), the other being betamethadol (β-methadol). Alphamethadol is composed of two isomers itself, L-α-methadol, and D-α-methadol. Both of alphamethadol's isomers bind to and activate the μ-opioid receptor and are active as opioid analgesics, similarly to those of alphacetylmethadol (α-acetylmethadol).

== Legal status ==
=== Australia ===
Alphamethadol is considered a Schedule 9 prohibited substance in Australia under the Poisons Standard (February 2017). A Schedule 9 substance is a substance which may be abused or misused, the manufacture, possession, sale or use of which should be prohibited by law except when required for medical or scientific research, or for analytical, teaching or training purposes with approval of Commonwealth and/or State or Territory Health Authorities.
