= Dimenoxadol =

Opioid analgesic drug

Clinical data
- Other names: Dimenoxadol, Estocin
- ATC code: none

Legal status
- Legal status: AU: S9 (Prohibited substance); BR: Class A1 (Narcotic drugs); CA: Schedule I; DE: Anlage I (Authorized scientific use only); US: Schedule I; UN: Psychotropic Schedule I

Identifiers
- IUPAC name: 2-(dimethylamino)ethyl 2-ethoxy-2,2-diphenylacetate
- CAS Number: 509-78-4
- PubChem CID: 17036
- DrugBank: DB01461
- ChemSpider: 16137
- UNII: 4D65PBX0VK
- KEGG: D12672
- ChEMBL: ChEMBL2104309
- CompTox Dashboard (EPA): DTXSID5057759

Chemical and physical data
- Formula: C_{20}H_{25}NO_{3}
- Molar mass: 327.424 g·mol^{−1}
- 3D model (JSmol): Interactive image
- SMILES: CCOC(C1=CC=CC=C1)(C2=CC=CC=C2)C(=O)OCCN(C)C
- InChI: InChI=1S/C20H25NO3/c1-4-24-20(17-11-7-5-8-12-17,18-13-9-6-10-14-18)19(22)23-16-15-21(2)3/h5-14H,4,15-16H2,1-3H3; Key:RHUWRJWFHUKVED-UHFFFAOYSA-N

Dimenoxadol (INN; also known as dimenoxadole (BAN) or dimenoxadole; brand name Estocin in Russia) is an opioid analgesic which is a benzilic acid derivative, closely related to benactyzine (an anticholinergic). Further, the structure is similar to methadone and related compounds like dextropropoxyphene.

It was invented in Germany in the 1950s, and produces similar effects to other opioids, including analgesia, sedation, dizziness and nausea.

In the United States it is a Schedule I Narcotic controlled substance with an ACSCN of 9617 and a 2013 annual aggregate manufacturing quota of zero.

== Synthesis ==
The chemical synthesis has been reported: (according to:) Ref: Patent: Cmp#3:

- The reaction between 2-chloro-2,2-diphenylacetyl chloride [2902-98-9] (1) and Deanol [108-01-0] (2) gives [3042-75-9] (3). The intermediate haloalkane is then alkoxylated by refluxing in ethanol, completing the synthesis of Dimenoxadol (4).
- The 2-chloro-2,2-diphenylacetyl chloride is made by reacting benzilic acid with phosphorus pentachloride.
