= Betamethadol =

Synthetic opioid analgesic drug

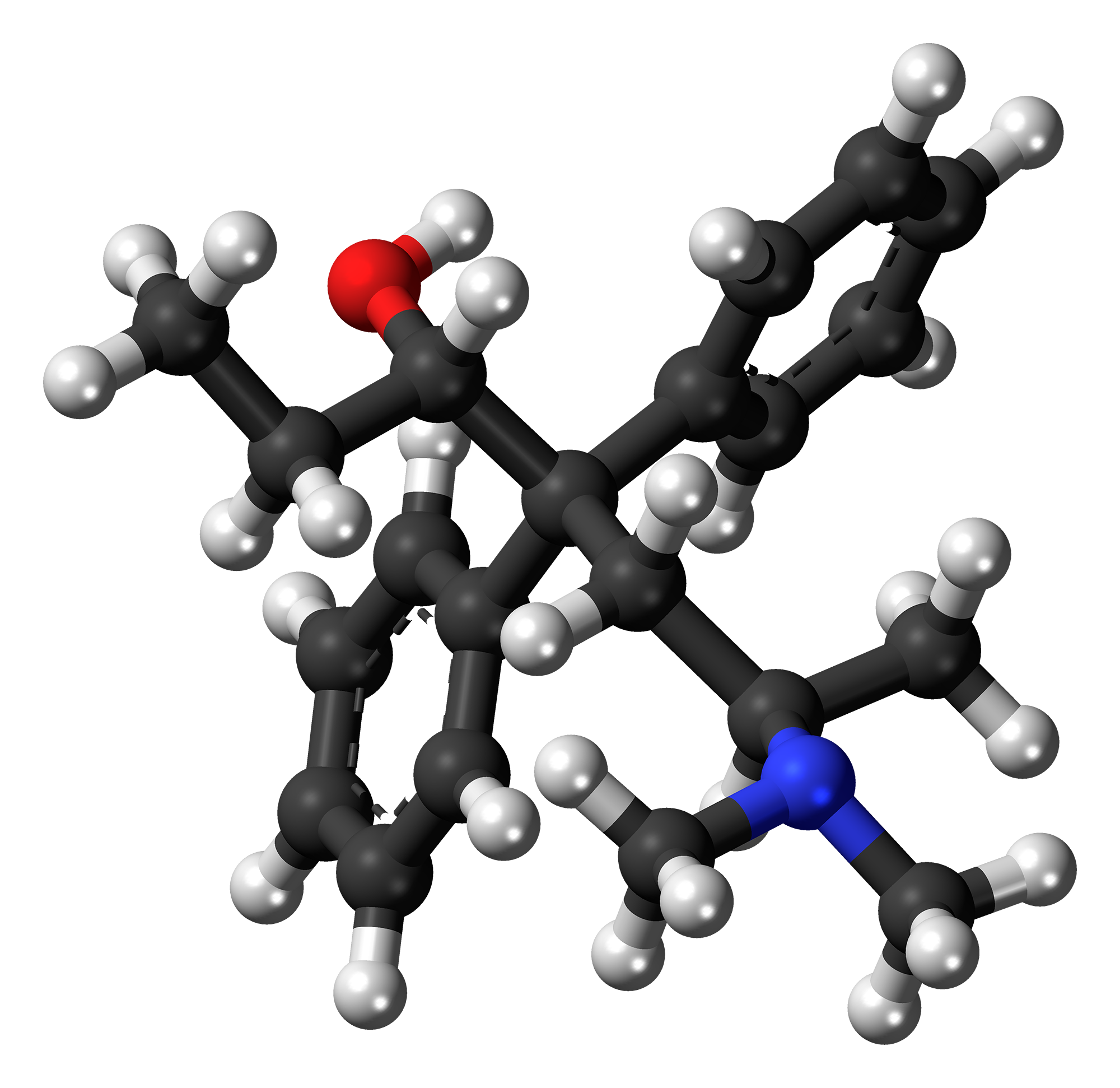

Clinical data
- Dependence liability: High
- ATC code: None

Legal status
- Legal status: AU: S9 (Prohibited substance); BR: Class A1 (Narcotic drugs); CA: Schedule I; DE: Anlage I (Authorized scientific use only); US: Schedule I

Identifiers
- IUPAC name: (3S,6R)-6-(dimethylamino)-4,4-diphenyl-3-heptanol
- CAS Number: 17199-55-2
- PubChem CID: 10064061
- ChemSpider: 8239601
- UNII: 57ANR1Z628
- KEGG: D12675
- ChEMBL: ChEMBL162243
- CompTox Dashboard (EPA): DTXSID501017192

Chemical and physical data
- Formula: C_{21}H_{29}NO
- Molar mass: 311.469 g·mol^{−1}
- 3D model (JSmol): Interactive image
- SMILES: O[C@H](C(c1ccccc1)(c2ccccc2)C[C@H](N(C)C)C)CC
- InChI: InChI=1S/C21H29NO/c1-5-20(23)21(16-17(2)22(3)4,18-12-8-6-9-13-18)19-14-10-7-11-15-19/h6-15,17,20,23H,5,16H2,1-4H3/t17-,20+/m1/s1; Key:QIRAYNIFEOXSPW-XLIONFOSSA-N

Betamethadol (INN), or β-methadol, also known as betametadol, is a synthetic opioid analgesic. It is an isomer of dimepheptanol (methadol), the other being alphamethadol (α-methadol). Betamethadol is composed of two isomers itself, L-β-methadol, and D-β-methadol. Based on structure-activity relationships it can be inferred that both isomers are likely to be active as opioid analgesics, similarly to those of betacetylmethadol (β-acetylmethadol).

== See also ==
- Dimepheptanol
- Alphamethadol
- Betacetylmethadol
