= Acetylmethadol =

Synthetic opioid analgesic

Clinical data
- Other names: methadyl acetate (USAN US)
- ATC code: None

Legal status
- Legal status: AU: S8 (Controlled drug); BR: Class A1 (Narcotic drugs); CA: Schedule I; DE: Anlage I (Authorized scientific use only); US: Schedule I

Identifiers
- IUPAC name: (±)-6-(dimethylamino)-4,4-diphenyl-3-heptanyl acetate
- CAS Number: 509-74-0
- PubChem CID: 10517
- DrugBank: DB01433
- ChemSpider: 10080
- UNII: L59OC40KWJ
- KEGG: D04973
- CompTox Dashboard (EPA): DTXSID2023274
- ECHA InfoCard: 100.007.368

Chemical and physical data
- Formula: C_{23}H_{31}NO_{2}
- Molar mass: 353.506 g·mol^{−1}
- 3D model (JSmol): Interactive image
- SMILES: O=C(OC(C(c1ccccc1)(c2ccccc2)CC(N(C)C)C)CC)C
- InChI: InChI=1S/C23H31NO2/c1-6-22(26-19(3)25)23(17-18(2)24(4)5,20-13-9-7-10-14-20)21-15-11-8-12-16-21/h7-16,18,22H,6,17H2,1-5H3; Key:XBMIVRRWGCYBTQ-UHFFFAOYSA-N

Acetylmethadol, also known as methadyl acetate, is a synthetic opioid analgesic. It is a racemic mixture of alphacetylmethadol (α-acetylmethadol) and betacetylmethadol (β-acetylmethadol), which are in turn racemic mixtures of levacetylmethadol (LAAM; L-α-acetylmethadol) and D-α-acetylmethadol and L-β-acetylmethadol and D-β-acetylmethadol, respectively. Hence, acetylmethadol has four possible optical isomers. All of these isomers have been shown to partially or fully substitute for the discriminative stimulus effects of heroin in rats, and thus it can be inferred that, in addition to LAAM which is used clinically as such, they are all likely to be active opioid analgesics in humans.

In the United States, acetylmethadol and its individual isomers are all Schedule I drugs under the Controlled Substances Act, except LAAM, which is Schedule II and was used clinically until 2003. Acetylmethadol has an ACSCN of 9601. The isomers have individual ACSCNs, which are as follows: Alphacetylmethadol 9603, Betacetylmethadol 9607, LAAM 9648. All of the above have annual manufacturing quotas of 2 grams as of 2013, except LAAM, which is 4 grams.
