= Opium Law =

Dutch drug law

The Opium Law (Opiumwet in Dutch) is the section of the Dutch law which covers nearly all psychotropic drugs.

== Origin and history ==
In 1912, the First International Opium Conference took place in The Hague, where agreements were made about the trade in opium; this initiated the introduction of the Opium Law, which took place 7 years later. In 1919, the first Opium Law (later known as List I of the Opium Law) was introduced, and on 12 May 1928 the second Opium Law (later known as List II of the Opium Law) was introduced. The first Opium Law was created to regulate drugs with a high addiction or abuse factor, or that are physically harmful. As the name indicates the main reason for introduction was to regulate the Opium trade and later to control various other addictive drugs like morphine, cocaine, heroin, barbiturates, amphetamines and several decades later, benzodiazapines, which were used both medically and recreationally.

Except for the addition of new drugs to List I and II of the Opium Law, the Opium Law remained unchanged until 1976. After the rise of a new youth culture which revolved much around the use of drugs like cannabis and LSD, and with hashish being openly used, a change of law was needed by the government, to properly control all drugs, but with a clear definition between drugs with an unacceptable degree of addictiveness or physical harm (known as hard drugs), and drugs with an acceptable degree of addictiveness or physical harm (known as soft drugs). In 1976 these changes officially took effect, and the Opium Law was edited to include the changes in the law. In the same year, a decision was made by the Dutch government to discontinue prosecuting cannabis and hashish offenses, provided the person did not sell hard drugs, did not advertise and carried less than a specified maximum amount of cannabis or hashish.

In 1980, the decision to not prosecute cannabis and hashish dealers, under certain conditions, was publicly announced by the Dutch government. Many people thereby concluded that this decision would also allow the sale in coffee shops, and coffee shops began selling cannabis and hashish. This led to an enormous rise in the number of coffee shops in the 80's and 90's, and because of this, new regulations were demanded by the government to regulate the sale of cannabis products by coffee shops. In 1996 the laws were changed again to include new regulations for coffee shops. The terms coffee shops had to follow were:

- No advertisement
- No hard drugs
- No entrance to coffee shops by persons under the age of 18
- No sale of more than 5 grams of cannabis products per person, per day
- Coffee shops are not allowed to have more than 500 grams of cannabis in stock at any time

Since 01-01-2020, no new changes have been made to the Opium Law. Most of the changes in law since 1996 have been additions of new psychoactive substances, ADB-FUBINACA has been one of the latest on this list being added on 01-01-2020. New guidelines for coffee shops have been made, but they are not covered by the Opium Law.

== List I drugs ==
The following drugs and intermediates are classified as List I drugs of the Opium Law:

- acetorphine
- acetyl-alpha-methylfentanyl
- acetyldihydrocodeine
- acetylmethadol
- alphacetylmethadol
- alphameprodine
- alphamethadol
- alphamethylfentanyl
- alpha-methylthiofentanyl
- alphaprodine
- alfentanil
- allylprodine
- amphetamine
- amineptine
- anileridine
- benzethidine
- benzylmorphine
- betacetylmethadol
- beta-hydroxy-3-methylfentanyl
- beta-hydroxyfentanyl
- betameprodine
- betamethadol
- betaprodine
- bezitramide
- bolkaf (all parts of the papaver somniferum plant, after harvesting, excluding seeds)
- brolamphetamine
- cathinone
- 2C-B (2,5-dimethoxy-4-bromophenethylamine)
- 2C-I (2,5-dimethoxy-4-iodophenethylamine)
- 2C-T-2 (2,5-dimethoxy-4-ethylthiophenethylamine)
- 2C-T-7 (2,5-dimethoxy-4-(n)-propylthiophenethylamine)
- clonitazene
- coca leaf (leaves of the plants of the species Erythroxylon)
- cocaine
- codeine
- codoxime
- concentrate of bolkaf (the material obtained by subjecting bolkaf to a treatment for the concentration of its alkaloids)
- desomorphine
- dexamphetamine
- dextromoramide
- dextropropoxyphene
- diampromide
- diethylthiambutene
- DET (N,N-diethyltryptamine)
- diphenoxide
- diphenoxylate
- dihydrocodeine
- dihydroetorphine
- dihydromorphine
- dimepheptanol
- dimenoxadol
- DMA (2,5-dimethoxyamphetamine)
- DOET (2,5-dimethoxy-4-ethylamphetamine)
- DOM (2,5-dimethoxy-4-methylamphetamine)
- dimethylthiambutene
- DMT (N,N-dimethyltryptamine)
- dioxaphetylbutyrate
- dipipanone
- DMHP (1,2-dimethylheptyl-delta-3-THC)
- drotebanol
- ecgonine (3-hydroxy-2-tropanecarbonic acid)
- MDEA (N-ethyl-3,4-methylenedioxyamphetamine)
- ethylmethylthiambutene
- ethylmorphine
- eticyclidine
- etonitazene
- etorphine
- etoxeridine
- etryptamine
- fentanyl
- fenethylline
- furethidine
- GHB (4-hydroxybutyric acid)
- hemp oil (concentrate of plants from the Cannabis species (hemp) obtained by extraction of hemp or hashish, if not mixed with oil)
- heroin (diamorphine)
- hydrocodone
- hydromorphinol
- hydromorphone
- MDOH (N-hydroxy-methylenedioxyamphetamine)
- hydroxypethidine
- isomethadone
- ketobemidone
- levamphetamine
- levophenacylmorphan
- levomethamphetamine
- levomethorphan
- levomoramide
- levorphanol
- lysergide
- mecloqualone
- mescaline (3,4,5-trimethoxyphenethylamine)
- methamphetamine
- methamphetamine racemate
- metazocine
- methadone
- methadone intermediate (4-cyano-2-dimethylamino-4,4-diphenylbutane)
- methaqualone
- methcathinone
- MMDA (2-methoxy-4,5-methylenedioxyamphetamine)
- 4-methylaminorex
- methyldesorphine
- methyldihydromorphine
- MDMA (3,4-methylenedioxymethamphetamine)
- methylphenidate
- 3-methylfentanyl
- MPPP (1-methyl-4-phenyl-4-piperidinol propionate ester)
- 4-MTA (4-methylthioamphetamine)
- 3-methylthiofentanyl
- metopon
- moramide intermediate (2-methyl-3-morpholino-1,1-diphenylpropane-carboxylic acid)
- morpheridine
- morphine
- morphine-methobromide
- morphine-N-oxide
- myrophine
- nicocodeine
- nicodicodine
- nicomorphine
- noracymethadol
- norcodeine
- norlevorphanol
- normethadone
- normorphine
- norpipanone
- opium (the harvested milk, obtained from the plant Papaver somniferum)
- oxycodone
- oxymorphone
- para-fluorofentanyl
- parahexyl
- PMA (para-methoxyamphetamine)
- PMMA (para-methoxymethamphetamine)
- PEPAP (1-fenethyl-4-fenyl-4-piperidinolacetate ester)
- pethidine
- pethidine Intermediate A (4-cyano-1-methyl-4-phenylpiperidine)
- pethidine Intermediate B (4-phenylpiperidine-4-carbonic acid ethylester)
- pethidine Intermediate C (1-methyl-4-phenylpiperidine-4-carbonic acid)
- phenadoxone
- phenampromide
- phenazocine
- phencyclidine
- phenmetrazine
- phenomorphan
- phenoperidine
- pholcodine
- piminodine
- piritramide
- proheptazine
- properidine
- propiram
- psilocine
- psilocybine
- racemethorphan
- racemoramide
- racemorphan
- remifentanil
- rolicyclidine
- secobarbital
- sufentanil
- temazepam^{†}
- tenamphetamine
- tenocyclidine
- tetrahydrocannabinol
- thebacon
- thebaïne
- thiofentanyl
- tilidine
- TMA-2 (2,4,5-trimethoxyamphetamine)
- trimeperidine
- TMA (3,4,5-trimethoxyamfetamine)
- zipeprol

The esters and derivatives of ecgonine, which can be turned into ecgonine and cocaine;

The mono- and di-alkylamide-, the pyrrolidine- and morpholine derivatives of lysergic acid, and the thereby introduction of methyl-, acetyl- or halogen groups obtained substances;

Fiveworthy nitrogen-substituted morphinederivates, of which morphine-N-oxide-derivatives, like codeine-N-oxide;

The isomers and stereoisomers of tetrahydrocannabinol;

The ethers, esters and enantiomers of the above mentioned substances, with exception of dextromethorphan (INN) as enantiomer of levomethorphan and racemethorphan, and with exception of dextrorphanol (INN) as enantiomere of levorphanol and racemorphan;

Formulations which contain one or more of the above mentioned substances.

^{†}Formulations of 20 mg or more of temazepam are classed under List I.

== List II drugs ==
The following drugs are classified as List II drugs of the Opium Law:

- allobarbital
- alprazolam
- amobarbital
- amfepramone
- aminorex
- barbital
- benzphetamine
- bromazepam
- brotizolam
- buprenorphine
- butalbital
- butobarbital
- camazepam
- cathine
- chlordiazepoxide
- clobazam
- clonazepam
- clorazepate
- clotiazepam
- cloxazolam
- cyclobarbital
- delorazepam
- diazepam
- estazolam
- ethchlorvynol
- ethinamate
- ethylloflazepate
- ethylamphetamine
- fencamfamine
- fenproporex
- fludiazepam
- flunitrazepam
- flurazepam
- glutethimide
- halazepam
- haloxazolam
- hashish (a usually solid mixture of the excreted resin obtained from plants of the Cannabis species (hemp), with plant materials of these plants)
- hemp (all parts of the plant from the Cannabis species (hemp), of which the resin has not been extracted, with exception of the seeds)
- ketazolam
- lefetamine
- loprazolam
- lorazepam
- lormetazepam
- mazindole
- medazepam
- mefenorex
- meprobamate
- mesocarb
- methylphenobarbital
- methyprylon
- midazolam
- nimetazepam
- nitrazepam
- nordiazepam
- oxazepam
- oxazolam
- pemoline
- pentazocine
- pentobarbital
- phendimetrazine
- phenobarbital
- phentermine
- pinazepam
- pipradrol
- prazepam
- pyrovalerone
- secbutabarbital
- temazepam (formulations containing less than 20 mg)
- tetrazepam
- triazolam
- vinylbital
- zolpidem

Formulations which contain one or more of the above mentioned substances, with exception of hemp oil.

== Medical use ==
Even though List I substances are officially classified as hard drugs, several of them are often prescribed by licensed doctors. For example, nearly all opioids are List I drugs, but they are commonly prescribed to cancer and HIV patients, as well as sufferers of chronic pain. Two stimulants which are both prescribed for ADD/ADHD and narcolepsy; dexamphetamine and methylphenidate, are also List I drugs of the Opium Law. On the other hand, all barbiturates except for secobarbital are List II drugs, while none of them, except for phenobarbital, are prescribed today. In theory, a licensed doctor could prescribe any substance they think is needed for the correct treatment of their patient, both List I and List II substances of the Opium Law, though substances which aren't available as commercial pharmaceutical preparations have to be custom prepared by the designated pharmacy.

All prescriptions for List I and some List II substances (amobarbital, buprenorphine, butalbital, cathine, cyclobarbital, flunitrazepam, temazepam, glutethimide, hemp, pentazocine and pentobarbital) of the Opium Law have to be written in full in letters, and have to contain the name and initials, address, city and telephone number of the licensed prescriber issuing the prescriptions, as well as the name and initials, address and city of the person the prescription is issued to. If the prescription is issued for an animal, the data of the owner should be used instead, and a description of the animal has to be included on the prescription.
