= Drug policy of India =

The major drug laws of India are the Narcotic Drugs and Psychotropic Substances Act (1985) and the Prevention of Illicit Trafficking in Narcotic Drugs and Psychotropic Substances Act (1988).

== Legal Background ==
=== Narcotic Drugs and Psychotropic Substances Act ===
The Narcotic Drugs and Psychotropic Substances Act of 1985 was introduced in the Lok Sabha on 23 August 1985. It was passed by both the Houses of Parliament and received presidential assent on 16 September 1985. It came into force on 14 November 1985 as the Narcotic Drugs and Psychotropic Substances Act, 1985 (shortened to NDPS Act). Under the NDPS Act, it is illegal for a person to produce/manufacture/cultivate, possess, sell, purchase, transport, store, and/or consume any narcotic drug or psychotropic substance.

Under one of the provisions of the act, the Narcotics Control Bureau was set up with effect from March 1986. The Act is designed to fulfill India's treaty obligations under the Single Convention on Narcotic Drugs, Convention on Psychotropic Substances, and United Nations Convention Against Illicit Traffic in Narcotic Drugs and Psychotropic Substances. The Act has been amended three times - in 1988, 2001, and most recently in 2014.

The 2014 Amendment recognizes the need for pain relief as an important obligation of the government. It creates a class of medicines called Essential Narcotic Drugs (ENDs). Power for legislation on ENDs has been shifted from the state governments to the central governments so that the whole country now can have a uniform law covering these medicines which are needed for pain relief.

Subsequently, NDPS rules which would be applicable to all states and union territories has been announced by the government of India in May 2015. It also has included 6 drugs namely Morphine, Fentanyl, Methadone, Oxycodone, Codeine and Hydrocodone. According to these rules, there is a single agency - the state drug controller - who can approve recognised medical institutions (RMI) for stocking and dispensing ENDs, without the need for any other licences. The RMIs are obliged to ensure proper documentation and to submit annual consumption statistics to the drug controller of the state.

The Act extends to the whole of India and it applies also to all Indian citizens outside India and to all persons on ships and aircraft registered in India.

A proposal to amend the NDPS Act via a Private Member's Bill was announced by Dr. Dharamvira Gandhi MP in November 2016. Dr. Gandhi's bill would legalise marijuana and opium.

=== Prevention of Illicit Trafficking in Narcotic Drugs and Psychotropic Substances Act ===
The Prevention of Illicit Trafficking in Narcotic Drugs and Psychotropic Substances Act is a drug control law passed in 1988 by the Parliament of India. It was established to enable the full implementation and enforcement of the Narcotic Drugs and Psychotropic Substances Act of 1985.

== Enforcement ==
The Narcotics Control Bureau (NCB) serves as the apex coordinating agency for drug law enforcement in India, focusing primarily on inter-state and international drug trafficking. At the local level, state police departments act as the primary enforcement bodies, while state excise departments, sometimes referred to as prohibition enforcement departments, concentrate on regulating the production, distribution, and sale of controlled substances. The Narco-Coordination Centre (NCORD), under Ministry of Home Affairs facilitates essential coordination among these diverse agencies, enhancing the efficacy of India's overall drug control strategy.

=== Narcotics Control Bureau ===
The Narcotics Control Bureau (NCB) is the chief law enforcement and intelligence agency of India responsible for fighting drug trafficking and the abuse of illegal substances. It was created on 17 March 1986 to enable the full implementation of the Narcotic Drugs and Psychotropic Substances Act (1985) and fight its violation through the Prevention of Illicit Trafficking in Narcotic Drugs and Psychotropic Substances Act (1988). Federal agencies, including the Border Security Force (BSF), Indo-Tibetan Border Police (ITBP), Sashastra Seema Bal (SSB), and Assam Rifles, Central Industrial Security Force (CISF) are responsible for combating illicit drug trafficking across India's borders, seaport and airports. The Railway Protection Force (RPF) targets drug trafficking via railways, while the Indian Coast Guard and Customs Department play vital roles in intercepting contraband at sea and through ports of entry.

== Punishment ==
Anyone who contravenes the NDPS Act will face punishment based on the quantity of the banned substance.

- where the contravention involves small quantity (<1 kg), with rigorous imprisonment for a term which may extend to 6 months, or with fine which may extend to ₹10,000 or with both;
- where the contravention involves quantity lesser than commercial quantity but greater than small quantity, with rigorous imprisonment for a term which may extend to 10 years and with fine which may extend to ₹1 lakh;
- where the contravention involves commercial quantity, with rigorous imprisonment for a term which shall not be less than 10 years but which may extend to 20 years and shall also be liable to fine which shall not be less than ₹1 lakh but which may extend to ₹2 lakh.

== Controlled substances ==
The following list mentions the names of all substances banned or controlled in India under the NDPS Act. The list uses the International Nonproprietary Name (INN) of the drugs but in some cases mentions drugs by their chemical name. Widely known drugs such as ganja, cocaine, heroin etc. are mentioned by those names.

Cultivation/production/manufacture, possession, sale, purchase, transport, storage, consumption or distribution of any of the following substances, except for medical and scientific purposes and as per the rules or orders and conditions of licences that may be issued, is illegal.

=== List of controlled substances ===
1. Acetorphine
2. Acetyl-alpha-methylfentanyl
3. Acetyldihydrocodeine
4. Acetylmethadol
5. Alfentanil
6. Allobarbital
7. Allylprodine
8. Alpha-Methyl-4-methylthiophenethylamine
9. Alphacetylmethadol
10. Alphameprodine
11. Alphamethadol
12. Alpha-methylfentanyl
13. Alpha-methylthiofentanyl
14. Alphaprodine
15. Alprazolam
16. Amfepramone
17. Aminorex
18. Amobarbital
19. Anileridine
20. Benzethidine
21. Benzyl morphine
22. Betacetylmethadol
23. Beta-hydroxyfentanyl
24. Beta-hydroxy-3-methylfentanyl
25. Betameprodine
26. Betamethadol
27. Betaprodine
28. Bezitramide
29. Cannabis and cannabis resin (includes Hashish and Charas)
30. Clonitazene
31. Coca derivatives
32. Coca leaf
33. Cocaine
34. Codeine
35. Codoxime
36. Concentrate of poppy straw
37. Desomorphine
38. Dextromoramide
39. Dextropropoxyphene
40. Diampromide
41. Diethylthiambutene
42. Difenoxin
43. Dihydrocodeine
44. Dihydromorphine
45. Dihydroxydihydromorphinone
46. Dimenoxadol
47. Dimepheptanol
48. Dimethylthiambutene
49. Dioxaphetyl butyrate
50. Diphenoxylate
51. Dipipanone
52. Drotebanol
53. Ecgonine
54. Ethylmethylthiambutene
55. Ethylmorphine
56. Etonitazene
57. Etorphine
58. Etoxeridine
59. Fentanyl
60. Furethidine
61. Ganja
62. Heroin
63. Hydrocodone
64. Hydromorphinol
65. Hydromorphone
66. Hydroxypethidine
67. Isomethadone
68. Ketobemidone
69. Levomethorphan
70. Levomoramide
71. Levophenacylmorphan
72. Levorphanol
73. Metazocine
74. Methadone
75. Methadone intermediate
76. Methyldihydromorphine
77. Methyldihydromorphine
78. 3-Methylfentanyl
79. 3-Methylthiofentanyl
80. Metopon
81. Moramide intermediate
82. Morpheridine
83. Morphine
84. Morphine methobromide
85. Morphine-N-oxide
86. MPPP
87. Myrophine
88. N-cyclopropyl methyl-7,8-dihydro-7-(1-hydroxy-1 methyl-ethyl) O-methyl-6,14-endoethanonormorphine
89. Nicocodine
90. Nicodicodine
91. Nicomorphine
92. Noracymethadol
93. Norcodeine
94. Norlevorphanol
95. Normethadone
96. Normorphine
97. Norpipanone
98. Opium
99. Opium derivatives
100. Oxycodone
101. Oxymorphone
102. Para-fluorofentanyl
103. PEPAP
104. Pethidine
105. Pethidine intermediate A
106. Pethidine intermediate B
107. Pethidine intermediate C
108. Phenadoxone
109. Phenampromide
110. Phenazocine
111. Phenomorphan
112. Phenoperidine
113. Pholcodine
114. Piminodine
115. Piritramide
116. Poppy straw
117. Preparations made from the extract or tincture of Indian hemp
118. Proheptazine
119. Properidine
120. Propiram
121. Racemethorphan
122. Racemoramide
123. Racemorphan
124. Sufentanil
125. Thebacon
126. Thebaine
127. Thiofentanyl
128. Tilidine
129. Tobacco
130. Trimeperidine
131. Brolamfetamine
132. Cathinone
133. 3-[2-(diethylamino)ethyl]indole (N,N-Diethyltryptamine)
134. (+)-2,5-dimethoxy-alpha-methylphenethylamine
135. 3-(1,2-dimethylheptyl)-7,8,9,10-tetrahydro-6,6,9-trimethyl-6H-dibenzo(b,d)pyran-1-ol
136. 3-[2-(dimethylamino) ethyl] indole (N,N-Dimethyltryptamine)
137. (+)-4-ethyl-1,5-dimethoxy-alpha-phenethylamine
138. Eticyclidine
139. Etryptamine
140. (+)-Lysergide
141. (+)-N,alpha-dimethyl-3,4-(methylenedioxy)phenethylamine
142. 3,4,5-trimethoxyphenethylamine
143. Methcathinone
144. (+)-cis-2-amino-4-methyl-5-phenyl-2-oxazoline
145. 2-methoxy-alpha-methyl-4,5-phenethylamine
146. (±)-N-ethyl-alpha-methyl-3,4-(methylenedioxy)phenethylamine
147. (±)-N-(alpha-methyl-3,4-(methylenedioxy)phenethyl) hydroxylamine
148. 3-hexy-7,8,9,10-tetrahydro-6,6,9-trimethyl-6H-dibenzo(b,d)pyran-1-ol
149. p-methoxy-alpha-methylphenethylamine
150. 3-(2-(dimethylamino)ethyl)indol-4-ol
151. Psilocybine
152. Rolicyclidine
153. 2,5-dimethoxy-alpha,4-dimethylphenethylamine
154. Tenamfetamine
155. Tenocyclidine
156. (+)-3,4,5-trimethoxy-alpha-methyphenethylamine
157. 4-bromo-2,5-dimethoxyphen Dexamfetamine
158. Fenetylline
159. Levamfetamine
160. (x)-N,alpha-dimethylphenethylamine
161. Mecloqualone
162. Metamfetamine
163. Metamfetamine (racemate)
164. Methaqualone
165. Methylphenidate
166. Phencyclidine
167. Phenmetrazine
168. Secobarbital
169. Dronabinol
170. Zipeprol
171. Buprenorphine
172. Butalbital
173. Cathine
174. Cyclobarbital
175. Flunitrazepam
176. Glutethimide
177. Pentazocine
178. Pentobarbital
179. Benzfetamine
180. Bromazepam
181. 5-butyl-5ric acid
182. Brotizolam
183. Camazepam
184. Chlordiazepoxide
185. Clobazam
186. Clonazepam
187. Clorazepate
188. Clotiazepam
189. Cloxazolam
190. Delorazepam
191. Diazepam
192. Estazolam
193. Ethchlorvynol
194. Ethinamate
195. Ethylloflazepate
196. Etilamfetamine
197. Fencamfamin
198. Fenproporex
199. Fludiazepam
200. Flurazepam
201. gamma-Hydroxybutyric acid
202. Halazepam
203. Haloxazolam
204. Ketazolam
205. Lefetamine
206. Loprazolam
207. Lorazepam
208. Lormetazepam
209. Mazindol
210. Medazepam
211. Mefenorex
212. Meprobamate
213. Mesocarb
214. Methylphenobarbital
215. Methyprylon
216. Midazolam
217. Nimetazepam
218. Nitrazepam
219. Nordazepam
220. Oxazepam
221. Oxazolam
222. Pemoline
223. Phendimetrazine
224. Phenobarbital
225. Phentermine
226. Pinazepam
227. Pipradrol
228. Prazepam
229. Pyrovalerone
230. Secbutabarbital
231. Temazepam
232. Tetrazepam
233. Triazolam
234. Vinylbital
235. Zolpidem
236. Ketamine
237. Tramadol
- Any mixture or preparation that of with or without a neutral material, of any of the above drugs.
- The following isomers and their stereochemical variants:

- 7,8,9,10-tetrahydro-6,6,9-trimethyl-3-pentyl-6H-dibenzo[b,d]pyran-1-ol (9R,10aR)-8,9,10,10a-trtrahydro-6,6,9-trimethyl-3-pentyl-6H-dibenzo[b,d]pyan-1-ol
- (6aR,9R,10aR)-6a,9,10,10-a- tetrahydro-6,6,9-tremthyl-3-penthyl-6H-dibenzo[b,d]pyran-1-ol
- (6aR,10aR)-6a,7,10,10a- tetrahydro-6,6,9-tremthyl-3-penthyl-6H-dibenzo[b,d]pyran-1-ol
- 6a,7,8,9-tetrahydro-6,6,9-trimethyl-3-pentyl-6h-dibenzo[b,d]pyran-1-ol
- (6aR,10aR)-6a,7,8,9,10,10a-hexahydro-6, 6-dimethyl-9-methylene 3-pentyl-6H-dibenxo[b,d]pyran-1-ol

Source: Narcotics Control Bureau

== See also ==
- Legal opium production in India
- Cannabis in India
- Bhang
- Schedule X
- Schedule H
- Temperance movement in India
- Drug addiction in Jammu and Kashmir
