= Misuse of Drugs Act 1977 =

Series of Irish laws banning narcotics

The Misuse of Drugs Act 1977, the Misuse of Drugs Act 1984, Misuse of Drugs Act 2015 and the Criminal Justice (Psychoactive Substances) Act 2010 are the acts of the Oireachtas regulating drugs in Ireland. The acts define the penalties for unlawful production, possession and supply of drugs.

In 2015, section 2(2) of the 1977 act was declared in violation of the Irish constitution by the Court of Appeal over concerns about the separation of powers. Specifically, the court held that the government could not engage in policy making to define what drugs are "dangerous, harmful" or what constitutes "misuse" as this was the exclusive right of the Oireachtas. As a result of this ruling, many drugs in Ireland immediately became legal, including ecstasy, ketamine, and crystal meth. The situation lasted 24 hours before emergency legislation closing the loophole could take effect. In 2016, this decision was overturned again by the Irish Supreme Court in Bederev v Ireland.

== Regulations ==
The act provides for the Minister for Health to make regulations scheduling drugs according to their use perceived medical usability and their risk to the public. Additionally, these regulations outline the requirements for distribution and monitoring of the listed substances. The principal regulations are Misuse of Drugs Regulations 1988 (SI 328/1988) as amended by Misuse of Drugs (Amendment) Regulations 1993 (SI 342/1993), Misuse of Drugs (Amendment No. 1) Regulations 1999 (SI 273/1999), Misuse of Drugs (Amendment) Regulations 2006 (SI 53/2006), Misuse of Drugs (Amendment) Regulations 2007 (SI 200/2007), Misuse of Drugs (Amendment) (No. 1) Regulations 2009 (SI 63/2009), Misuse of Drugs (Amendment) (No. 2) Regulations 2009 (SI 122/2009) and Misuse of Drugs (Amendment) (No. 2) Regulations 2010 (SI 200/2010).

=== Schedule 1 ===
The substances (and certain derivatives thereof) considered by the state to have no medicinal or scientific value with consideration given regarding their likelihood of their being abused and thus would be considered illegal drugs.

==== Substances ====
- 1-(1,3-Benzodioxol-5-yl)-2-(1-pyrrolidinyl)-pentanone (i.e. MDPV, added by 2010 Regulations)
- 1-Benzylpiperazine (added by 2010 Regulations, replacing '1-benzylpiperazinc (BZP)', added by 2009 Regulations)
- Bufotenine
- Cannabinol (except where contained in cannabis or cannabis resin)
- Cannabinol derivatives
- cannabis and cannabis resin (hashish)
- Cathinone
- Coca leaf
- Concentrate of poppy-straw
- [2,3–Dihydro–5–methyl–3–(4–morpholinylmethyl)pyrrolo[1, 2, 3–de]–1,4–benzoxazin–6–yl]–1–naphthalenylmethanone (i.e. WIN 55,212-2, added by 2010 Regulations)
- 3–Dimethylheptyl–11–hydroxyhexahydrocannabinol (i.e. canbisol, added by 2010 Regulations)
- Eticyclidine
- Etryptamine (added by 2010 Regulations)
- 1-(2-Fluorophenyl)-2-methylaminopropan-1-one (i.e. 2-FMC, added by 2010 Regulations)
- 1-(3-Fluorophenyl)-2-methylaminopropan-1-one (i.e. 3-FMC, added by 2010 Regulations)
- 1-(4-Fluorophenyl)-2-methylaminopropan-1-one (i.e. flephedrone, by 2010 Regulations)
- 9-(Hydroxymethyl)–6, 6–dimethyl–3–(2–methyloctan–2–yl)–6a, 7, 10, 10a–tetrahydrobenzo[c]chromen–1–ol (i.e. HU-210, added by 2010 Regulations)
- [9–Hydroxy–6–methyl–3–[5–phenylpentan–2–yl] oxy–5, 6, 6a, 7, 8, 9, 10, 10a octahydrophenanthridin–1–yl] acetate (i.e. levonantradol, added by 2010 Regulations)
- Khat (being the leaves of Catha edulis (Celastraceae)) (added by 1993 Regulations)
- Lysergamide
- Lysergide (and other N-alkyl derivatives of lysergamide) (i.e. LSD)
- 3,4-Methylenedioxymethamphetamine (MDMA, ecstasy, molly)
- Mescaline
- Methcathinone (added by 2010 Regulations)
- 1-(4-Methoxyphenyl)-2-(methylamino)propan-1-one (i.e. methedrone, added by 2010 Regulations)
- 2-Methylamino-1-(3,4-methylenedioxyphenyl)butan-1-one (i.e. butylone, added by 2010 Regulations)
- 2-Methylamino-1-(3,4-methylenedioxyphenyl)propan-1-one (i.e. methylone, added by 2010 Regulations)
- 4-(Methylthio)phenethylamine (i.e. 4-MTA, added by 2010 Regulations)
- 1-(4-Methylphenyl)-2-methylaminopropan-1-one (i.e. mephedrone, added by 2010 Regulations)
- Psilocin
- Raw opium
- Rolicyclidine
- Tenocyclidine
- N,N-Diethyltryptamine
- N,N-Dimethyltryptamine
- N-(1-Benzyl-4-piperidyl)propionanilide
- N-(1-(2-(2-Thienyl)ethyl)-4-piperidyl)propionanilide
- 2,5-Dimethoxy-α,4-dimethylphenethylamine
- N-Hydroxytenamphetamine and 4-Methyl-aminorex (added by 1993 Regulations)

=== Schedule 2 ===
Strictly controlled medicinal products (and derivatives thereof) or drugs used for scientific purposes which have a high likelihood of their being abused. Exemptions are provided to cover legitimate use for professional purposes by doctors, pharmacists, vets etc. and in other specified circumstances.

==== Substances and products ====
- Acetorphine
- Acetylmethadol
- Alfentanil
- Allylprodine
- Alphacetylmethadol (i.e. levacetylmethadol)
- Alphameprodine
- Alphamethadol
- Alphaprodine
- Anileridine
- Benzethidine
- Benzylmorphine (3-benzylmorphine)
- Betacetylmethadol
- Betameprodine
- Betamethadol
- Betaprodine
- Bezitramide
- Carfentanil
- Clonitazene
- Cocaine
- Codoxime
- Desomorphine
- Dextromoramide
- Diampromide
- Diethylthiambutene
- Difenoxin
- Dihydroetorphine (added by 2010 Regulations)
- Dihydromorphine
- Dimenoxadole (presumably Dimenoxadol)
- Dimepheptanol
- Dimethylthiambutene
- Dioxaphetyl butyrate
- Diphenoxylate
- Dipipanone
- Drotebanol
- Ecgonine (and any derivative of ecgonine which is convertible to ecgonine or to cocaine)
- Ethylmethylthiambutene
- Etonitazene
- Etorphine
- Etoxeridine
- Fentanyl
- Furethidine
- Heroin
- Hydrocodone
- Hydromorphinol
- Hydromorphone
- Hydroxypethidine
- Isomethadone
- Ketobemidone
- Levomethorphan
- Levomoramide
- Levophenacylmorphan
- Levorphanol
- Lofentanil
- Medicinal opium
- Metazocine
- Methadone
- Methyldesorphine
- Methyldihydromorphine (6-methyldihydromorphine)
- Methylphenidate
- Metopon
- Morpheridine
- Morphine
- Morphine methobromide (morphine N-oxide and other pentavalent nitrogen morphine derivatives)
- Myrophine
- Nabilone
- Nicomorphine
- Noracymethadol
- Norlevorphanol
- Normethadone
- Normorphine
- Norpipanone
- Oripavine (added by 2010 Regulations)
- Oxycodone
- Oxymorphone
- Pethidine
- Phenadoxone
- Phenampromide
- Phenazocine
- Phencyclidine
- Phenomorphan
- Phenoperidine
- Piminodine
- Piritramide
- Proheptazine
- Properidine
- Racemethorphan
- Racemoramide
- Racemorphan
- Remifentanil (added by 2010 Regulations)
- Sufentanil
- Tapentadol (added by 2010 Regulations)
- Thebacon
- Thebaine
- Tilidine
- Trimeperidine
- 4-Cyano-2-dimethylamino-4,4-diphenylbutane
- 4-Cyano-1-methyl-4-phenylpiperidine
- 2-Methyl-3-morpholino-1,1-diphenylpropanecarboxylic acid
- 1-Methyl-4-phenylpiperidine-4-carboxylic acid
- 1-Phenylcyclohexylamine
- 4-Phenylpiperidine-4-carboxylic acid ethyl ester
- 4-(1-Phenylcyclohexyl)morpholine
- 1-Piperidinocyclohexanecarbonitrile
- 1-(1-(2-Thienyl)cyclohexyl)pyrrolidine
- 4-(1-(-2-Thienyl)cyclohexyl)morpholine

==== Substances ====
- Acetyldihydrocodeine
- Amineptine (added by 2010 Regulations)
- Amphetamine
- Amphetaminil (added by 2010 Regulations)
- Benzphetamine
- Buprenorphine
- Butorphanol
- Codeine
- Dexamphetamine
- Dextropropoxyphene
- Dihydrocodeine
- Ethylmorphine (3-ethylmorphine)
- Fenethylline
- Glutethimide
- Lefetamine
- Mecloqualone
- Methaqualone
- Methylamphetamine
- Methylphenidate
- Nalbuphine
- Nicocodine
- Nicodicodine (6-nicotinoyldihydrocodeine)
- Norcodeine
- Phendimetrazine
- Phenmetrazine
- Pholcodine
- Propiram
- Quinalbarbitone
- N-Ethylamphetamine
- Zipeprol (added by 2010 Regulations)

=== Schedule 3 ===
Controlled medicinal products (and certain derivatives thereof) have a high likelihood of their being abused. Exemptions are provided to cover legitimate use for professional purposes by doctors, pharmacists, etc. and are frequently prescribed to the public for common ailments.

==== Substances ====
- Cathine
- 1-(3-Chlorophenyl)-4-(3-chloropropyl)piperazine (i.e. CCP, added by 2010 Regulations)
- 1-(3-Chlorophenyl)piperazine (i.e. mCPP, added by 2010 Regulations)
- Chlorphentermine
- Diethylpropion
- Ethchlorvnol (presumably Ethchlorvynol)
- Ethinamate
- Flunitrazepam (moved up from Schedule 4 by 1993 Regulations)
- 4-Hydroxybutanoic acid (added by 1993 Regulations)
- Ketamine (added by 2010 Regulations)
- Mazindol
- Mephentermine
- Meprobamate
- Methyprylone
- Pemoline
- Pentazocine
- Phentermine
- Pipradrol
- Temazepam (moved up from Schedule 4 by 1993 Regulations)

=== Schedule 4 ===
Controlled medicinal products (and certain derivatives thereof).

==== Substances ====
- Alprazolam
- Aminorex (added by 2010 Regulations)
- Bromazepam
- Brotizolam (added by 2010 Regulations)
- Camazepam
- Chlordiazepoxide
- Clobazam
- Clonazepam
- Clorazepic Acid
- Clotiazepam
- Cloxazolam
- Delorazepam
- Diazepam
- Estazolam
- Ethyl loflazepate
- Fencamfamin
- Fenproporex
- Fludiazepam
- Flurazepam
- Halazepam
- Haloxazolam
- Ketazolam
- Loprazolam
- Lorazepam
- Lormetazepam
- Medazepam
- Mefenorex
- Mesocarb (added by 2010 Regulations)
- Midazolam (added by 1993 Regulations)
- Nimetazepam
- Nitrazepam
- Nordazepam
- Oxazepam
- Oxazolam
- Pinazepam
- Prazepam
- Propylhexedrine
- Pyrovalerone
- Selegiline (moved down from Schedule 2 by 1993 Regulations)
- Tetrazepam
- Triazolam
- Zolpidem (added by 2010 Regulations)

=== Schedule 5 ===
Products containing a relatively small proportion of certain substances listed in schedules 1-4 (e.g. cough medicines containing codeine) and are usually administered by a doctor or pharmacist.

=== Schedule 8 ===
Schedule 8 (inserted by the 2007 Regulations) lists the drugs that can be prescribed by a registered nurse within schedules 2 and 3 for pain relief in hospitals, palliative care, midwifery and neonatal care in hospital and the particular method of administration of these drugs.
