= C18H22BrNO3 =

The molecular formula C_{18}H_{22}BrNO_{3} (molar mass: 380.28 g/mol, exact mass: 379.0783 u) may refer to:

- 25B-NBOMe
- Morphine methylbromide
