= McNulty v DPP =

Irish Supreme Court case

McNulty v DPP [2009] IESC 12
- Coat of arms of Ireland
- Court: Supreme Court of Ireland
- Full case name: Fergal McNulty v The Director of Public Prosecutions and His Honour Judge Michael White
- Decided: 15 May 2009
- Citation: [2009] IESC 12; [2009] 3 IR 572
- Transcript: https://www.bailii.org/ie/cases/IESC/2009/S12.html

Case history
- Prior action: McNulty v DPP [2006] IEHC 74
- Appealed from: High Court
- Appealed to: Supreme Court

Court membership
- Judges sitting: Hardiman J, Geoghegan J., Fennelly J.

Case opinions
- The Supreme Court upheld the decisions of the lower courts and decided that the question of Judicial Review was not to be dealt with by the Supreme Court.
- Decision by: Hardiman J.

McNulty v DPP [2009] IESC 12; [2009] 3 IR 572 is an Irish Supreme Court case where the appellant had been previously charged with possession of controlled drugs with an intent to supply contrary to the Misuse of Drugs Act 1977; the case was heard in the Dublin Circuit Criminal Court before Judge Michael White, where the jury were unable to reach a verdict and accordingly disagreed. The appellant claimed that the respondent had unfairly taken advantage of the jury's disagreement after what he claims was an incorrect decision by White J in allowing the admittance of additional evidence to make up for the "defects in proof at the first trial."

The appellant claimed that this constituted an abuse of process because 1) if the judge had correctly decided the legal issues he would have been acquitted and 2) if he had been convicted, the conviction “would have been quashed with no retrial” and thus it was "inequitable that he is now in a worse position" because the jury disagreed instead of convicting him. Thus, the appellant sought an injunction to restrain the Director of Public Prosecutions (DPP) from pursuing the charges made against him.

The Supreme Court dismissed the appeal and decided that, where the trial judge is "capable of making all of the appropriate determinations of law and fact", judicial review was generally not a proper form of relief when it concerns the High Court's decision as to the admissibility of evidence before the commencement of a criminal trial.

== Background ==
Mr McNulty was originally charged with the possession of a controlled drug. However, the more prominent charge was that for the possession of MDMA with the intent to sell or supply to another person. As a result of another offence alleged against McNulty, which he was acquitted for, the Gardaí made certain observations on the apartment of McNulty, as a result of this they applied for a search warrant for the apartment.

There was a challenge raised on McNulty's behalf in relation on the legality of the search warrant granted by the District Court. This challenge resulted in a voir dire, which is similar to a small pre-trial conducted with only the members of counsel and the judge. At the end of this process the Judge ruled in favor of the admissibility of the search warrant. The jury were unable to reach a verdict and disagreed. Following this trial's conclusion the prosecution in the case served more evidence on McNulty. At the crux of McNulty's case was that the DPP had taken advantage of the jury's disagreement by serving additional evidence in order to rectify the issues with proof in the initial trial. McNulty claimed that there were two reasons which this case can be brought forward, firstly he is of the opinion that he would have been acquitted if the trial judge had decided the legal issues correctly. Secondly, he was of the opinion that if he was convicted, that the conviction would have been quashed and as a result of this it is inequitable that he is in a worse position because of the disagreement of the jury.

== Holding of the Supreme Court ==
The decision of the Court was delivered by Justice Hardiman in relation to a case for judicial review against the High Court. The Court affirmed the High Court order to refuse the relief sought by McNulty, this judgement was supported by concurrence from Geoghegan J and Fennelly J.

This appeal was dismissed on the two grounds which were brought forward by McNulty. Hardiman J stated that most relevantly to the Court currently is that in order to issue a valid warrant the District Court would have to hear oral evidence from the applicant in the case and there was no obvious evidence this occurred. Also, it was said that the warrant did not establish that the District Court Judge had been satisfied of the information which it required he be. Rather that it appeared to him as a result of information on oath from a member of the Gardaí that there was reasonable grounds for suspecting evidence of the offence in McNulty's home.

McNulty had lodged for a stay on proceedings and not to allow the DPP to pursue prosecution against him he also sought judicial review in a declaration stating he was entitled to acquittal. The Supreme Court took a stance of deference in relation to this issue of the merits of the issue raised before the Circuit Court. McNulty's representation relied heavily on previous decisions such C.C. v Ireland & ors which showcased an allowance for the Court to decide cases upon their particular merits and make their own decision on these matters. However, Hardiman J was of the opinion that the facts in issue would be capable of being resolved by the Circuit Court judge and this would be the most appropriate action as the issues arising are from a pending Circuit Court case. The Supreme Court also drew inferences between the two cases, as in this case McNulty was seeking to quash on certiorari a decision of the Circuit Court Judge from 6 years previous. The fact of the matter is that the ruling of the lower court is entirely moot because it had no continuance of legal effect and had no binding nature.

The second relief sought was the prohibition or injunction to stop the upcoming trial and similarly to the above is based on the idea that the ruling of the lower Court was wrong in law. As a result of what has already been established because this point was rendered moot in relation to the first relief it has been understood to be identical in this case and therefore the relief is not to be granted.

This case also importantly investigated the point as to whether or not a member of An Garda Síochána seeking a warrant must appear before the District Court Judge. This was queried by McNulty under section 10 of the Criminal Justice Act. This was relevant to the case because the District Judge did not state he was fully satisfied by the evidence provided. This issue calls into question "the root of our legal culture and the protection of the constitutional rights of the citizen." The resolution of this issue is paramount to the case. However, this Court felt that they were not the correct authority to deal with this query.

This case addressed a substantial issue in the decision of a court on the granting of a warrant for searching premises, as it looked at how the decision to grant should be reached. This case highlighted whether or not there was necessity to have a member of An Garda Síochána seeking a warrant "present himself before the learned District Judge and answer any questions it occurs to the judge to put to him in order to satisfy himself." Whilst this Court did not answer the question, it did highlight the necessity for it to be addressed.

Hardiman J found that at the root of this case was the admissibility of certain evidence rather than substantive law which was at the root of the C.C. case along with procedural issues in regards to the admission of evidence submitted to the trial judge. Hardiman J stated there was no one single answer to this issue but articulated that it is something to be decided with the specific evidence in each case. Therefore, the Court dismissed the appeal.

== Further Developments ==
In Sweeny v Ireland & Ors the plaintiff, Mr Michael Sweeney, successfully argued that section 9(1)(b) of the Offences Against the State (Amendment) Act 1998 was unconstitutional; this case was distinguished from McNulty v DPP as Baker J rejected the State's claim that the case "had not been proved in evidence and that the relief sought was more properly a matter for the trial court".
