= Brazilian Controlled Drugs and Substances Act =

Brazil's federal drug control statute

The Brazilian Controlled Drugs and Substances Act (Portuguese: Regulamento Técnico sobre substâncias e medicamentos sujeitos a controle especial), officially Portaria nº 344/1998, is Brazil's federal drug control statute, issued by the Ministry of Health through its National Health Surveillance Agency (Anvisa). The act also serves as the implementing legislation for the Single Convention on Narcotic Drugs, the Convention on Psychotropic Substances, and the United Nations Convention Against Illicit Traffic in Narcotic Drugs and Psychotropic Substances in the country.

The list was last updated in May 2024.

Terminology:

- Prescription notification - a standardized document intended for notifying Anvisa of the prescription of medications. Written by the doctor and retained by the drugstore
- Prescription - a written medication order that provides usage instructions for the patient.
- Special control prescription - a prescription that is filled out in two copies, one that is retained by the drugstore, and another stays with the patient for usage guidance. It can be provided in a digital signed form.

== Overview ==
Controlled goods classes
Class	Type of substance	Rx type
A1	Narcotic drugs: analgesics, opioids, non-opioids, other analgesics	Yellow "A" Prescription Notification form (provided by Anvisa), along with a prescription.
A2	Narcotic drugs: analgesics, opioids and non-opioids	Yellow "A" Prescription Notification form (provided by Anvisa), along with a prescription.
A3	Psychoactive drugs: central nervous system stimulants	Yellow "A" Prescription Notification form (provided by Anvisa), along with a prescription.
B1	Psychoactive drugs: antiepileptics, sleep inducers, anxiolytics, antidepressants, tranquilizers	Blue "B" Prescription Notification form (the doctor request a printing press for it)
B2	Psychoactive drugs: anorectics	Blue "B" Prescription Notification form (the doctor request a printing press for it)
C1	Other controlled substances: antidepressants, antiparkinsonians, anticonvulsants, antiepileptics, neuroleptics and anesthetics	Special control prescription form, filled in two copies. A digital prescription can be used alternatively.
C2	Retinoids: treatmeant of severe cystic acne	White Prescription Notification form (the doctor request a printing press for it) Contains a teratogenic warning and a sign.
C3	Immunosuppressive drugs	Prescription notification form, and a consent form regarding teratogenic risks, confirming understanding and agreeing to be the sole user of the drug. (form provided by a local public health organization to the doctor)
C4	Antiretroviral drugs: management of HIV/AIDS - List revoked in September 2016.	revoked
C5	Anabolic steroids	Special control prescription form, filled in two copies. A digital prescription can be used alternatively.
D1	Drug precursors	
D2	Drug precursors	
E	Controlled Plants and Fungi	
F	Prohibited Substances	Allowed only in authorized scientific research.
F1	Prohibited narcotics	Allowed only in authorized scientific research.
F2	Prohibited psychotropics	Allowed only in authorized scientific research.
F3	Prohibited precursors	Allowed only in authorized scientific research.
F4	Other prohibited substances	Allowed only in authorized scientific research.

== Class A1 ==
- Acetylmethadol
- Alphacetylmethadol
- Alphameprodine
- Alphamethadol
- Alphaprodine
- Alfentanil
- Allylprodine
- Anileridine
- Bezitramide
- Benzethidine
- Benzylmorphine
- Benzoylmorphine (CID 10982005 from PubChem)
- Betaacetylmethadol
- Betameprodine
- Betamethadol
- Betaprodine
- Buprenorphine
- Butorphanol
- Clonitazene
- Codoxime
- Concentrated opium poppy straw
- Dextromoramide
- Diampromide
- Diethylthiambutene
- Diphenoxylate
- Difenoxin
- Dihydromorphine
- Dimepheptanol
- Dimenoxadol
- Dimethylthiambutene
- Dioxaphetyl butyrate
- Dipipanone
- Drotebanol
- Ethylmethylthiambutene
- Etonitazene
- Etoxeridine
- Phenadoxone
- Phenampromide
- Phenazocine
- Phenomorphan
- Phenoperidine
- Fentanyl
- Furethidine
- Hydrocodone
- Hydromorphinol
- Hydromorphone
- Hydroxypethidine
- Methadone intermediate
- Moramide intermediate
- Pethidine intermediate A
- Norpethidine (Pethidine intermediate B)
- Pethidinic acid (Pethidine intermediate C)
- Isomethadone
- Levophenacylmorphan
- Levomethorphan
- Levomoramide
- Levorphanol
- Methadone
- Metazocine
- Methyldesorphine
- Methyldihydromorphine
- Metopon
- Myrophine
- Morpheridine
- Morphine
- Morinamide
- Nicomorphine
- Noracymethadol
- Norlevorphanol
- Normethadone
- Normorphine
- Norpipanone
- Codeine-N-oxide
- Morphine-N-oxide
- Opium
- Oripavine
- Oxycodone
- Oxymorphone
- Pethidine
- Piminodine
- Piritramide
- Proheptazine
- Properidine
- Racemethorphan
- Racemoramide
- Racemorphan
- Remifentanil
- Sufentanil
- Tapentadol
- Thebacon
- Thebaine
- Tilidine
- Trimeperidine
- Viminol

== Class A2 ==
- Acetyldihydrocodeine
- Codeine
- Dextropropoxyphene
- Dihydrocodeine
- Ethylmorphine (Dionine)
- Pholcodine
- Nalbufina
- Nalorphine
- Nicocodine
- Nicodicodine
- Norcodeine
- Propiram
- Tramadol

== Class A3 ==
- Amphetamine
- Cathine
- Chlorphentermine
- Dexamphetamine
- Dronabinol - Synthetic form with no other cannabinoid.
- Phenmetrazine
- Phencyclidine
- Phenethylline
- Levamphetamine
- Lisdexamfetamine
- Methylphenidate
- Methylsynephrine
- Thamphetamine
- Cannabis sativa derivates containing up to 30mg/mL THC and 30mg/mL CBD

== Class B1 ==
- Allobarbital
- Alprazolam
- Amineptine
- Amobarbital
- Aprobarbital
- Armodafinil
- Barbexaclone
- Barbital
- Bromazepam
- Bromazolam
- Brotizolam
- Butabarbital
- Butalbital
- Camazepam
- Ketamine
- Ketazolam
- Cyclobarbital
- Clobazam
- Clonazepam
- Clonazolam
- Chlorazepam (CAS: 34985-87-0 , CID 3084599 from PubChem, UNII: R14J9HX8JT)
- Clorazepate
- Chlordiazepoxide
- Ethyl chloride
- Methylene chloride/dichloromethane
- Clotiazepam
- Cloxazolam
- Delorazepam
- Diazepam
- Diclazepam
- Esketamine
- Estazolam
- Eszopiclone
- Ethchlorvynol
- Ethylamphetamine (N-Ethylamphetamine)
- Ethinamate
- Etizolam
- Phenazepam
- Phenobarbital
- Flualprazolam
- Flubromazolam
- Fludiazepam
- Flunitrazepam
- Flunitrazolam
- Flurazepam
- GBL
- GHB
- Glutethimide
- Halazepam
- Haloxazolam
- Lefetamine
- Ethyl loflazepate
- Loprazolam
- Lorazepam
- Lormetazepam
- Medazepam
- Meprobamate
- Mesocarb
- Methylphenobarbital (prominal)
- Methyprylon
- Midazolam
- Modafinil
- Nimetazepam
- Nitrazepam
- Fencamfamin
- Nordazepam
- Oxazepam
- Oxazolam
- Pemoline
- Pentazocine
- Pentobarbital
- Perampanel
- Pinazepam
- Pipradrol
- Pyrovalerone
- Prazepam
- Prolintane
- Propylhexedrine
- Secbutabarbital
- Secobarbital
- Temazepam
- Tetrazepam
- Thiamylal
- Thiopental
- Triazolam
- Trichlorethylene
- Trihexyphenidyl
- Vinylbital
- Zaleplon
- Zolpidem
- Zopiclone
- Cannabis derivates containing up to 0,2% THC

== Class B2 ==
- Aminorex
- Amfepramone
- Fenproporex
- Phendimetrazine
- Phentermine
- Mazindol
- Mefenorex
- Sibutramine

== Class C1 ==
- Acepromazine
- Valproic acid
- Agomelatine
- Amantadine
- Amisulpride
- Amitriptyline
- Amoxapine
- Aripiprazole
- Asenapine
- Atomoxetine
- Azacyclonol
- Beclamide
- Benactyzine
- Benfluorex
- Benzydamine
- Benzoctamine
- Benzquinamide
- Biperiden
- Brexpiprazole
- Brivaracetam
- Bupropion
- Buspirone
- Butaperazine
- Butriptyline
- Cannabidiol - Synthetic form with no other cannabinoid.
- Captodiame
- Carbamazepine
- Caroxazone
- Celecoxib
- Cyclarbamate
- Cyclexedrine (CAS: 532-52-5 , CID 115663 from PubChem)
- Cyclopentolate
- Cisapride
- Citalopram
- Clomacran
- Clomethiazole
- Clomipramine
- Chloralodol
- Chlorpromazine
- Chlorprothixene
- Clotiapine
- Clozapine
- Dapoxetine
- Desflurane
- Desipramine
- Desvenlafaxine
- Deutetrabenazine
- Dexetimide
- Dexmedetomidine
- Dibenzepine
- Dimetacrine
- Disopyramide
- Disulfiram
- Divalproex sodium
- Dixyrazine
- Donepezil
- Doxepin
- Droperidol
- Duloxetine
- Ectylurea (See Acylurea) (CAS: 95-04-5 , CID 5895404 from PubChem)
- Emylcamate
- Enflurane
- Entacapone
- Escitalopram
- Etomidate
- Etoricoxib
- Ethosuximide
- Levophacetoperane
- Phenprobamate
- Phenaglycodol
- Phenelzine
- Pheniprazine
- Phenytoin
- Fluphenazine
- Flumazenil
- Fluoxetine
- Flupentixol
- Fluvoxamine
- Gabapentin
- Galantamine
- Haloperidol
- Halothane
- Chloral hydrate
- Etodroxizine (Hydrochlorbenzethylamine)
- Hydroxydione
- Homofenazine
- Imiclopazine
- Imipramine
- Imipraminoxide
- Iproclozide
- Isocarboxazid
- Isoflurane
- Cenestil (Isopropyl-crotonyl-urea) (CAS: 60364-26-3 , CID 6377520 from PubChem)
- Lacosamide
- Lamotrigine
- Leflunomide
- Levetiracetam
- Levomepromazine
- Levomilnacipran
- Lisuride
- Lithium
- Loperamide
- Loxapine
- Lumiracoxib
- Lurasidone
- Mavacamten
- Maprotiline
- Meclofenoxate
- Mephenoxalone
- Mefexamide
- Memantine
- Mepazine
- Mesoridazine
- Methylnaltrexone
- Methylpentynol
- Methysergide
- Metixene
- Methopromazine (CAS: 61-01-8 , CID 18847 from PubChem)
- Methoxyflurane
- Mianserin
- Milnacipran
- Miltefosine
- Minaprine
- Mirtazapine
- Misoprostol - Hospital authorization only.
- Moclobemide
- Molnupiravir
- Moperone
- Naloxone
- Naltrexone
- Nefazodone
- Nialamide
- Isobutyl nitrite
- Isopentyl nitrite
- Isopropyl nitrite
- Nomifensine
- Nortriptyline
- Noxiptiline
- Olanzapine
- Opipramol
- Oxcarbazepine
- Oxybuprocaine
- Hydroxyphenamate
- Oxypertine
- Paliperidone
- Parecoxib
- Paroxetine
- Penfluridol
- Perphenazine
- Pergolide
- Pericyazine
- Pimozide
- Pipamperone
- Pipotiazine
- Pramipexole
- Pregabalin
- Primidone
- Prochlorperazine
- Promazine
- Propanidid
- Propiomazine
- Propofol
- Prothipendyl
- Protriptyline
- Proparacaine
- Quetiapine
- Ramelteon
- Rasagiline
- Reboxetine
- Ribavirin
- Rimonabant
- Risperidone
- Rivastigmine
- Rofecoxib
- Ropinirole
- Rotigotine
- Rufinamide
- Selegiline
- Sertraline
- Sevoflurane
- Sulpiride
- Sultopride
- Tacrine
- Teriflunomide
- Tetrabenazine
- Tetracaine
- Tiagabine
- Tianeptine
- Tiapride
- Thioproperazine
- Thioridazine
- Thiothixene
- Tolcapone
- Topiramate
- Tranylcypromine
- Trazodone
- Triclofos
- Trifluoperazine
- Trifluperidol
- Trimipramine
- Troglitazone
- Valdecoxib
- Sodium valproate
- Venlafaxine
- Veralipride
- Vigabatrin
- Vilazodone
- Vortioxetine
- Ziprasidone
- Zotepine
- Zuclopenthixol

== Class C2 ==
- Acitretin
- Adapalene
- Bexarotene
- Isotretinoin
- Tretinoin

== Class C3 ==
- Thalidomide
- Lenalidomide
- Pomalidomide

== Class C4 ==
List revoked in September 2016.

- Abacavir
- Amprenavir
- Atazanavir
- Darunavir
- Delavirdine
- Didanosine (ddI)
- Dolutegravir
- Efavirenz
- Enfuvirtide
- Stavudine (d4T)
- Etravirine
- Fosamprenavir
- Indinavir
- Lamivudine (3TC)
- Lopinavir
- Maraviroc
- Nelfinavir
- Nevirapine
- Raltegravir
- Ritonavir
- Saquinavir
- Tenofovir
- Tipranavir
- Zalcitabine (ddC)
- Zidovudine (AZT)

== Class C5 ==
- Androstanolone
- Bolasterone
- Boldenone
- Chlorodehydromethyltestosterone
- Clostebol
- Dehydrochlormethyltestosterone
- Drostanolone
- Stanolone
- Stanozolol
- Ethylestrenol
- Fluoxymesterone
- Formebolone
- Gestrinone
- Mesterolone
- Methandienone
- Methandranone
- Methandriol
- Methenolone
- Methyltestosterone
- Mibolerone
- Nandrolone
- Norethandrolone
- Oxandrolone
- Oxymesterone
- Oxymetholone
- Prasterone (dehydroepiandrosterone - DHEA)
- Somapacitan
- Somatrogon
- Somatropin (Human Growth Hormone)
- Testosterone
- Trenbolone

== Class D ==
=== Class D1 ===
- 1-Boc-4-AP (CAS: 125541-22-2 , CID 1491502 from PubChem)
- 1-phenyl-2-propanone
- 3,4-MDP-2-P ethyl glycidate (PMK ethyl glycidate)
- 3,4-MDP-2-P methyl glycidic acid (PMK glycidic acid)
- 3,4-MDP-2-P methyl glycidate (PMK glycidate)
- 3,4-Methylenedioxyphenyl-2-propanone
- 4-AP (N-Phenyl-4-piperidinamine) 23056-29-3
- Anthranilic acid
- Phenylacetic acid
- Lysergic acid
- N-Acetylanthranilic acid
- Alpha-phenylacetoacetonitrile (APAAN) (CAS: 4468-48-8 , CID 20547 from PubChem)
- Alpha-phenylacetoacetamide (APAA) (CAS: 4433-77-6 , CID 12541433 from PubChem)
- 4-ANPP
- Dihydroergometrine
- Dihydroergotamine
- Ephedrine
- Ergometrine
- Ergotamine
- Etafedrine
- Helional
- Isosafrole
- Methyl alpha-acetylphenylacetate (MAPA) - (CAS: 16648-44-5 , CID 13096216 from PubChem)
- Norfentanyl
- Sassafras oil
- Long pepper oil
- Piperidine
- Piperonal
- Pseudoephedrine
- N-phenethyl-4-piperidinone (NPP)
- Safrole

=== Class D2 ===
- Acetone
- Hydrochloric acid
- Sulfuric acid
- Acetic anhydride
- Ethyl chloride
- Methylene Chloride
- Chloroform
- Ethyl Ether
- Methyl ethyl ketone
- Potassium permanganate
- Sodium sulphate
- Toluene
- Trichlorethylene

== Class E ==
- Cannabis sativa - except for registed products under allowed dosage mentioned in Class A3.
- Claviceps paspali (Ergot)
- Datura suaveolens
- Erythroxylum coca
- Lophophora williamsii (Coto Peyote)
- Mitragyna speciosa
- Papaver somniferum
- Prestonia amazonica
- Salvia divinorum

== Class F ==
=== Class F1 ===
- 2F-Viminol
- 2-Methyl-AP-237 (methyl analogue of bucinnazine)
- 3-Methylfentanyl
- 3-Methylthiofentanyl
- 4-Fluoroisobutyrfentanyl
- Acetyl-alpha-methylfentanyl
- Acetylfentanyl
- Acetorphine
- Acryloylfentanyl
- AH-7921
- Alpha-methylfentanyl
- Alpha-methylthiofentanyl
- Beta-hydroxy-3-methylfentanyl
- Beta-hydroxyfentanyl
- Brorphine
- Butyrfentanyl
- Butonitazene
- Carfentanil
- Ketobemidone
- Cyclopropylfentanyl
- Cocaine
- Crotonylfentanyl
- Desomorphine
- Dihydroetorphine
- Ecgonine
- Etazene (Etodesnitazene)
- Etonitazepyne
- Etorphine
- Furanylfentanyl
- Heroin
- Isotonitazene
- MDPV
- Metonitazene
- Methoxyacetylfentanyl
- MPPP
- MT-45
- N-Desethyletonitazene
- N-Pyrrolidino Metonitazene (CID 168323127 from PubChem, UNII: 449M7Z5DTK)
- Ocfentanil
- Orthofluorofentanyl
- Parafluorobutyrfentanyl
- Parafluorofentanyl
- PEPAP
- Protonitazene
- Tetrahydrofuranylfentanyl
- Thiofentanyl
- U-47700
- Valerylfentanyl

=== Class F2 ===
- LSD
- 1B-LSD
- 1cP-LSD
- 1P-LSD
- 2C-B
- 2C-C
- 2C-D
- 2C-E
- 2C-F
- 2C-I
- 2C-T-2
- 2C-T-7
- 2-MeO-Diphenidine
- 3-Fluorophenmetrazine
- 3-MeO-PCP
- 3-MMC
- 4-AcO-DMT
- 4-AcO-MET
- 4-Bromomethcathinone
- 4-Chloro-alpha-PVP
- 4-Chloromethcathinone (4-CMC)
- 4-Fluoroamphetamine (4-FA)
- 4-Fluoromethcathinone
- 4F-MDMB-BINACA
- 4-HO-MIPT
- 4-MEAPP
- 4-MEC
- 4-Methylaminorex
- 4-MTA
- 4,4'-DMAR
- 5-APB
- 5-APDB
- 5C-MDA-19 (BZO-POXIZID, CAS: 1048973-64-3 , UNII: J8AEQ47LPQ)
- 5-EAPB
- 5F-AB-FUPPYCA
- 5F-ADB
- 5F-AKB48
- 5F-AMB-PINACA
- 5F-MDA-19 (5F-BZO-POXIZID, UNII: HN6S9AD58B)
- 5F-MDMB-PICA
- 5F-PB-22
- 5-IAI
- 5-MAPDB
- 5-MeO-AMT
- 5-MeO-DALT
- 5-MeO-DIPT
- 5-MeO-DMT
- 5-MeO-MIPT
- 25B-NBOH
- 25B-NBOMe
- 25C-NBF
- 25C-NBOH
- 25C-NBOMe
- 25D-NBOMe
- 25E-NBOH
- 25E-NBOMe
- 25H-NBOH
- 25H-NBOMe
- 25I-NBF
- 25I-NBOH
- 25I-NBOMe
- 25N-NBOMe
- 25P-NBOMe
- 25T2-NBOMe
- 25T4-NBOMe
- 25T7-NBOMe
- 30C-NBOMe
- AB-CHMINACA
- AB-FUBINACA
- AB-PINACA
- ADB-5Br-INACA (CID 167713294 from PubChem, UNII: 79V2QU4QLC)
- ADB-BUTINACA
- ADB-CHMINACA
- ADB-FUBIATA
- ADB-FUBINACA
- ADB-INACA (CAS: 1887742-42-8 , CID 155928944 from PubChem)
- ALD-52
- Alpha-D2Pv
- Alpha-EAPP
- Alpha-PHP
- alpha-PiHP
- Alpha-PVP
- AKB48
- AM-2201
- AMT
- Benzphetamine
- Bk-DMBDB
- Brolamphetamine
- BZO-4en-POXIZID (4en-pentyl MDA-19)
- BZO-CHMOXIZID
- BZO-HEPOXIZID, (Z)-N'-(1-heptyl-2-oxoindolin-3-ylidene)benzohydrazide
- BZP
- Cathinone
- CH-PIATA (CID 165361915 from PubChem)
- Clobenzorex
- CUMYL-4CN-BINACA
- CUMYL-PEGACLONE
- DET
- Diphenidine
- Dihydro-LSD (ChemSpider ID: 67024742) (8β)-N,N-Diethyl-6-methyl-9,10-didehydro-2,3-dihydroergoline-8-carboxamide
- Dimethylone
- DMA
- DMAA
- DMBA
- DMHP
- DMT
- DOC
- DOET
- DOI
- EAM-2201
- Ergine
- Eticyclidine
- Ethylphenidate
- Ethylone
- Etryptamine
- Eutylone
- FUB-AMB
- Isopropylbenzylamine
- JWH-018
- JWH-071
- JWH-072
- JWH-073
- JWH-081
- JWH-098
- JWH-122
- JWH-210
- JWH-250
- JWH-251
- JWH-252
- JWH-253
- Levomethamphetamine
- MAM-2201
- MAM-2201 N-(4-hydroxypentyl) (CAS: 1537889-05-6 , CID 131668101 from PubChem, UNII: KZ2BB26N57)
- MAM-2201 N-(5-chloropentyl) (CAS: 1445578-25-5 , CID 91864523 from PubChem, UNII: 22GGZ1S2LF)
- MDMB-4en-PINACA
- MDMB-5Br-INACA
- MDMB-INACA (CAS: 2709672-58-0 , CID 167713261 from PubChem)
- mCPP
- MDA-19 (BZO-HEXOXIZID)
- MDAI
- MDE
- MDMA
- Mecloqualone
- Mephedrone
- Mescaline
- Methallylescaline
- Methanphetamine
- Methaqualone
- Methcathinone
- Methylone
- Methiopropamine
- MMDA
- MXE
- N-acetyl-3,4-MDMC (CAS: 1227293-15-3 , CID 91693878 from PubChem)
- N-Ethylcathinone
- N-Ethylhexedrone (hexen)
- N-Ethylpentylone
- Parahexyl
- Pentedrone
- Pentylone
- PMA
- PMMA
- Psilocybin
- Psilocin
- RH-34
- Rolicyclidine (PCPy)
- Salvinorin A
- DOM (STP)
- Tenamfetamine
- Tenocyclidine
- THC - except for registed products under allowed dosage mentioned in Class A3.
- TH-PVP
- TMA
- TFMPP
- UR-144
- XLR-11
- Zipeprol

=== Class F3 ===
- Phenylpropanolamine (PPA) or norephedrine

=== Class F4 ===
- Dexfenfluramine
- Dinitrophenol
- Strychnine
- Etretinate
- Fenfluramine
- Lindane
- Terfenadine
