= Somatrogon =

Chemical compound

Clinical data
- Trade names: Ngenla
- Other names: MOD-4023, somatrogon-ghla
- AHFS/Drugs.com: Monograph
- MedlinePlus: a623041
- License data: US DailyMed: Somatrogon
- Pregnancy category: AU: B1
- Routes of administration: Subcutaneous
- ATC code: H01AC08 (WHO)

Legal status
- Legal status: AU: S4 (Prescription only); BR: Class C5 (Anabolic steroids); CA: ℞-only / Schedule D; US: ℞-only; EU: Rx-only

Identifiers
- CAS Number: 1663481-09-1
- DrugBank: DB14960
- UNII: 6D848RA61B
- KEGG: D10990

Somatrogon, sold under the brand name Ngenla, is a medication for the treatment of growth hormone deficiency. Somatrogon is a glycosylated protein constructed from human growth hormone and a small part of human chorionic gonadotropin which is appended to both the N-terminal and C-terminal. Somatrogon is a human growth hormone analog.

The most common side effects include reactions at the site of injection, headache, and fever.

Somatrogon was approved for medical use in Australia in November 2021, in the European Union in February 2022, and in the United States in June 2023.

== Medical uses ==
Somatrogon is indicated for the treatment of children who have growth failure due to inadequate secretion of endogenous growth hormone.

== History ==
The US Food and Drug Administration (FDA) approved somatrogon based on one clinical trial (NCT02968004) of 224 children with growth hormone deficiency and short stature. The trial was conducted at 84 sites in 24 countries including Argentina, Australia, Bulgaria, Belarus, Canada, Colombia, Germany, Georgia, Greece, India, Israel, Italy, Mexico, New Zealand, Poland, South Korea, Russia, Spain, Taiwan, Turkey, Ukraine, the United Kingdom, Vietnam, and the United States. This trial was used to assess efficacy and safety. The benefits and side effects were evaluated in a clinical trial. Children aged 3 to 12 years old were assigned at random to weekly somatrogon or another daily approved growth hormone for 52 weeks.

== Society and culture ==
=== Legal status ===
In December 2021, the Committee for Medicinal Products for Human Use of the European Medicines Agency adopted a positive opinion, recommending the granting of a marketing authorization for the medicinal product Ngenla, intended for the treatment of growth hormone deficiency in children and adolescents from three years of age. The applicant for this medicinal product is Pfizer Europe MA EEIG. Somatrogon was approved for medical use in the European Union in February 2022.

=== Names ===
Somatrogon is the international nonproprietary name.
