= Drug addiction in Jammu and Kashmir =

Indian drug addiction

Drug addiction is defined as out of control use of drugs despite their negative effects. Some drugs are used to experience euphoria. Such drugs stimulate brain’s dopamine reward system thereby creating pleasure and gradually leading to dependence and escalating use. When the drug is reduced or stopped, individuals may experience irritability, insomnia, tremors, and gastrointestinal discomfort, which often drives them back to drug use. In recent years Jammu and Kashmir in India has seen an exponential increase in the drug use. According to official data shared by the Central Government in Parliament, the number of people affected by drug abuse in Jammu and Kashmir has reached nearly 10 lakh, which is around 8% of the total population of Jammu and Kashmir. (Note: "experts suggesting that this is the percentage that is known, is being reported, seeks treatment, and that happens at an advanced stage.") On 4 August 2023 the Standing Committee on Social Justice and Empowerment has conveyed to the Parliament of India that approximately 13.50 lakh drug users are estimated to be in Jammu and Kashmir, with the majority falling within the age range of 18 to 75 years.

In the 1990s, Professor Mushtaq Ahmad Margoob showed cannabis was the most commonly used substance. A study between 2002 -2005 conducted by Dr. Abdul Majid - Professor, HoD of Psychiatry and Sub-Dean at SKIMS Medical College and Hospital, Bemina, Srinagar - showed a shift toward medicinal substances such as injectable opioids, benzodiazepines, cough syrups. Later on Dr. Yasir Hassan Rather found inhalants becoming increasingly common among students, including correction fluids, adhesives, paints and thinners.

== Extent of problem ==
According to the United Nations Office on Drugs and Crime, Jammu and Kashmir has 60000 drug addicts. In last three years there has been an increase of 1500% in the use of drugs. In March 2023, Ministry of Social Justice and Empowerment stated that approximately one million individuals in the Union territory were grappling with substance abuse. The ministry also revealed that over 50% of these individuals were specifically addicted to opioids. As per a survey carried out by the Jammu and Kashmir administration last year, over 52,000 individuals in Kashmir acknowledged their heroin usage. The survey findings revealed that, on average, a user spent approximately 88,000 rupees ($1,063.54; £860) per month to sustain their drug habit.

According to the doctors at the Institute of Mental Health and Neurosciences Srinagar (IMHANS), there has been a transition observed in drug usage patterns. Specifically, there is a shift away from using medicinal opioids like Codeine, SP, Tramadol, and Tapentadol, towards the more potent and dangerous hardcore drugs, predominantly intravenous (IV) heroin. According to Dr. Yasir Rather, approximately 70% of drug users test positive for HCV at IMHANS.

In 2023, a study conducted by IMHANS revealed that the prevalence of Hepatitis C among drug abusers in Kashmir is 72 percent. The institute received 150 drug addiction cases per day. It also found that over 33 thousand syringes are being used daily for heroin injections.

On 12 June 2023, Dr. Farooq Abdullah, the National Conference President and Member of Parliament from Srinagar, said that the drug addiction or substance abuse have become significant threats to the youth of Jammu and Kashmir. Expressing his worries about the alarming increase in drug addiction cases among the youth, Dr. Farooq called drug abuse a widespread issue in the region. He urged everyone to reflect on this problem.

According to IMHANS, on an average a heroin addict in Kashmir spends about 90,000 rupees on every month.

== Treatment ==
According to the survey report, treatment and specialist interventions were in short supply. The Drug de-addiction centres have been flooded in recent years. Most of the patients that are admitted in these centres are Heroin addicts. In Kashmir, there are limited private institutions, and the region has just two public drug rehabilitation centers situated in Srinagar - one being IMHANS, and the other operated by the police. Additionally, the government has established Addiction Treatment Facility Centres (ATFCs) in every district. However, ATFCs differ from drug rehabilitation centers as they do not provide admission facilities. Instead, they function as small clinics with one doctor, a counselor, and a nurse, dedicated to treating patients dealing with addiction issues. Based on official statistics, the Institute of Mental Health and Neurosciences (IMHANS) in Srinagar, a distinguished rehabilitation center, witnesses an average of 150 fresh drug addiction cases every day. Out of these, approximately 70 cases are returning patients seeking follow-up care, while the rest are entirely new cases. It's worth noting that around 15 of these daily cases, constituting 10 percent of the total, are teenagers.

== Substance abused ==
On the basis of a study of 189 out-patients dealing with drug abuse, all of whom were registered at the Hospital for Psychiatric Diseases in Srinagar, the most commonly abused substance among them was cannabis, followed by heroin. It was observed that cannabis users had the longest duration of drug use but exhibited the lowest rate of drug dependence (29.9%) and the lowest rate of multiple drug abuse (6.1%). On the other hand, heroin users had the highest rate of drug dependence (88.8%) and the highest rate of multiple drug abuse (83.4%). Doctors express concern over the prevalence of heroin users, stating that the level of addiction it induces is alarming. According to Dr. Rather, when compared to cannabis or medicinal opioids, heroin's addictive nature surpasses them significantly. Users attempting to quit heroin often endure severe withdrawal symptoms, including physical pain, aches, and restlessness.

Psychiatrists and other experts have noted use of other abused substances such as brown sugar, SP tablets, Anxit, Alprax, as well as inhalants such as Fevicol, thinner, shoe polish, and varnish.

== Adolescent drug users ==
According to the Standing Committee on Social Justice and Empowerment, in the age group of 10 to 17 years, an estimated 1,68,700 children in Jammu and Kashmir are involved in drug use. The substances being used by these children include Cannabis, Opioids, Sedatives, Cocaine, Amphetamine-Type Stimulants (ATS), inhalants, and Hallucinogens

== Anti-drug campaign ==
In 2026, Jammu and Kashmir administration had launched a 100-day ‘Drug-Free J&K campaign’. On 22 July 2026, LG Manoj Sinha said, the 100-day campaign resulted in the arrest of 2,581 drug traffickers, seizure of nearly 1,431 kilograms of narcotics, and confiscation of over ₹188.89 crore in assets.

== See also ==
- Drug policy of India
