= Cyclarbamate =

Chemical compound

Clinical data
- Other names: BSM-906M
- ATC code: None

Legal status
- Legal status: BR: Class C1 (Other controlled substances); In general: ℞ (Prescription only)

Identifiers
- IUPAC name: Cyclopentane-1,1-diyldimethanediyl bis(phenylcarbamate)
- CAS Number: 5779-54-4
- PubChem CID: 72076
- ChemSpider: 65062
- UNII: 779291866J
- ChEMBL: ChEMBL2104142
- CompTox Dashboard (EPA): DTXSID60206480
- ECHA InfoCard: 100.024.821

Chemical and physical data
- Formula: C_{21}H_{24}N_{2}O_{4}
- Molar mass: 368.433 g·mol^{−1}
- 3D model (JSmol): Interactive image
- SMILES: O=C(OCC1(CCCC1)COC(=O)Nc2ccccc2)Nc3ccccc3
- InChI: InChI=1S/C21H24N2O4/c24-19(22-17-9-3-1-4-10-17)26-15-21(13-7-8-14-21)16-27-20(25)23-18-11-5-2-6-12-18/h1-6,9-12H,7-8,13-16H2,(H,22,24)(H,23,25); Key:IRZVVDMCEZNNCW-UHFFFAOYSA-N

Cyclarbamate (INN; Casmalon), also known as cyclopentaphene, is a muscle relaxant and tranquilizer of the carbamate family which has been marketed by Cassenne in France since 1961.
