= Ocfentanil =

Synthetic opioid

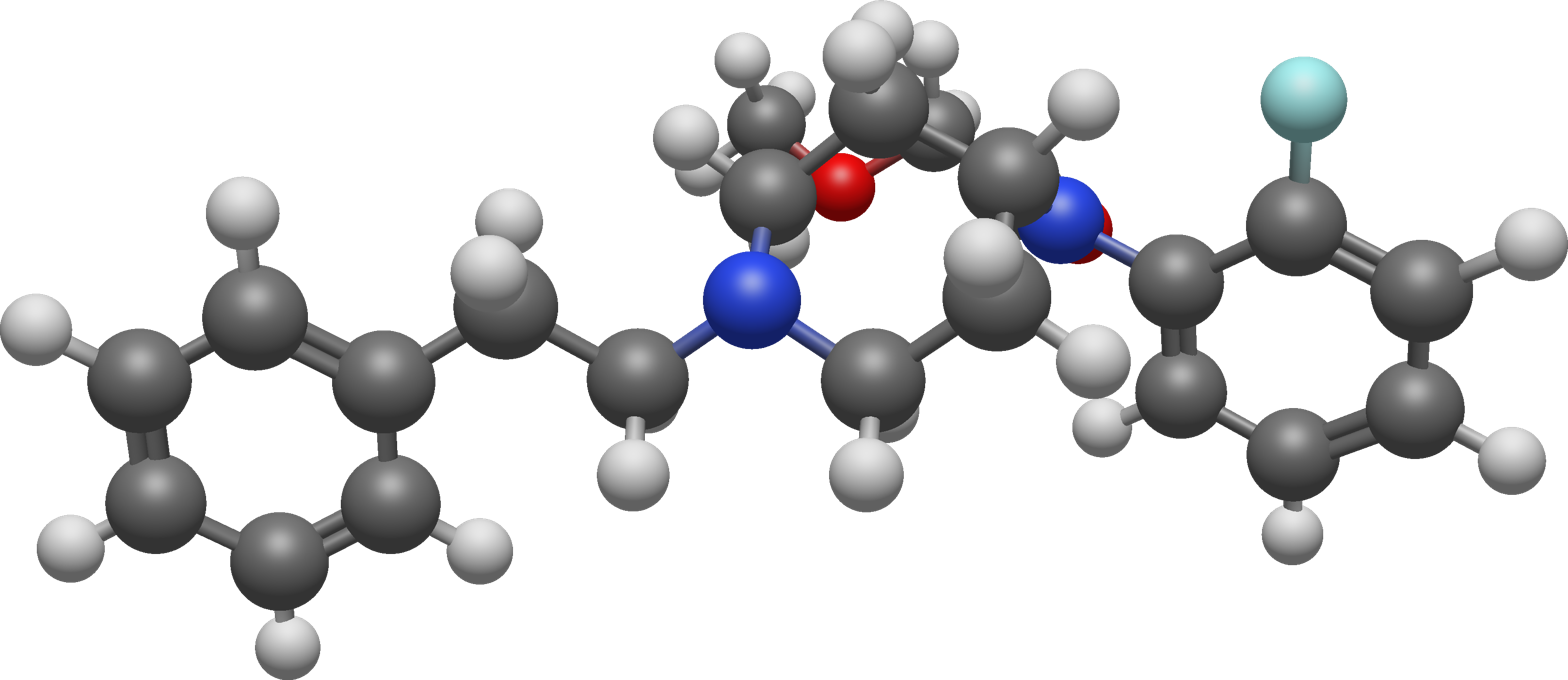

Clinical data
- Other names: Ocfentanyl, A-3217
- ATC code: none

Legal status
- Legal status: BR: Class F1 (Prohibited narcotics); CA: Schedule I; DE: Anlage II (Authorized trade only, not prescriptible); UK: Class A; US: Schedule I; Illegal in China

Identifiers
- IUPAC name: N-(2-Fluorophenyl)-2-methoxy-N-[1-(2-phenylethyl)piperidin-4-yl]acetamide
- CAS Number: 101343-69-5
- PubChem CID: 60575
- ChemSpider: 54604
- UNII: MX52WBC8EV
- ChEBI: CHEBI:183384
- CompTox Dashboard (EPA): DTXSID00869356

Chemical and physical data
- Formula: C_{22}H_{27}FN_{2}O_{2}
- Molar mass: 370.468 g·mol^{−1}
- 3D model (JSmol): Interactive image
- SMILES: COCC(=O)N(C1CCN(CC1)CCC2=CC=CC=C2)C3=CC=CC=C3F
- InChI: InChI=1S/C22H27FN2O2/c1-27-17-22(26)25(21-10-6-5-9-20(21)23)19-12-15-24(16-13-19)14-11-18-7-3-2-4-8-18/h2-10,19H,11-17H2,1H3; Key:NYISTOZKVCMVEL-UHFFFAOYSA-N

Ocfentanil (INN; also called A-3217) is a potent synthetic opioid structurally related to fentanyl that was developed in the early 1990s as one of a series of potent naloxone-reversible opioids. The aim was to obtain an opioid with better therapeutic indices regarding cardiovascular effects and respiratory depression compared to fentanyl. Despite showing reasonable results in human clinical trials, Ocfentanil was never developed for medical use. However, it subsequently began to be sold as a designer drug around 2013.

Study of the analgesic activity of ocfentanil using the mouse hot plate test (55 °C) gave an ED_{50} of 0.007 mg/kg compared to 0.018 mg/kg for fentanyl, indicating that ocfentanil is approximately 2.5 times as potent as fentanyl in this test.

In human volunteers, ocfentanil induces effective analgesia at 1 μg/kg, while at doses up to 3 μg/kg, analgesia and respiratory depression occurred in a dose-dependent manner. One study suggests ocfentanil may be as effective as morphine in post-operative relief, and it has also been studied as a supplement to general anesthesia. Researchers concluded that it appears to be similar in action to fentanyl, with 3 μg/kg of ocfentanil approximately equivalent to 5 μg/kg of fentanyl.

Side effects of fentanyl analogs are similar to those of fentanyl itself, including itching, nausea and potentially serious respiratory depression, which can be life-threatening. Fentanyl analogs have killed hundreds of people throughout Europe and the former Soviet republics since the most recent resurgence in use began in Estonia in the early 2000s, and novel derivatives continue to appear.

== Legal status ==
As of October 2015, Ocfentanil is a controlled substance in China.

Ocfentanil has been a Schedule I controlled drug in the USA since February 1, 2018.
