= Mefexamide =

Central nervous system stimulant that is no longer marketed

Names
- Preferred IUPAC name N-[2-(Diethylamino)ethyl]-2-(4-methoxyphenoxy)acetamide
- Other names Mefaxadyne

Identifiers
CAS Number	1227-61-8
3D model (JSmol)	Interactive image
ChEBI	CHEBI:92373
ChEMBL	ChEMBL1368380
ChemSpider	3905
ECHA InfoCard	100.013.603
EC Number	214-963-1
KEGG	D04894
PubChem CID	4045
UNII	84FP054Z2Q
CompTox Dashboard (EPA)	DTXSID5048475
- InChI: InChI=1S/C15H24N2O3/c1-4-17(5-2)11-10-16-15(18)12-20-14-8-6-13(19-3)7-9-14/h6-9H,4-5,10-12H2,1-3H3,(H,16,18) Key: HUNIPYLVUPMFCZ-UHFFFAOYSA-N
- SMILES: CCN(CC)CCNC(=O)COC1=CC=C(C=C1)OC

Properties
Chemical formula	C_{15}H_{24}N_{2}O_{3}
Molar mass	280.368 g·mol^{−1}

Hazards
- GHS labelling
Pictograms	(GHS06: Toxic)
Signal word	Danger
Hazard statements	H300, H310, H330
Precautionary statements	P260, P262, P264, P270, P271, P280, P284, P301+P310, P302+P350, P304+P340, P310, P320, P321, P330, P361, P363, P403+P233, P405, P501
Legal status	BR: Class C1 (Other controlled substances)
- Except where otherwise noted, data are given for materials in their standard state (at 25 °C [77 °F], 100 kPa). Infobox references

Mefexamide (INN, USAN) (brand names Perneuron, Peroxinorm, Timodyne; developmental code name ANP-297), also known as mefexadyne and mexephenamide, is a central nervous system stimulant that is no longer marketed.

== See also ==
- Clofexamide
- Dimethocaine
- Meclofenoxate
