= Imiclopazine =

Antipsychotic medication

Imiclopazine INN: Imiclopazine
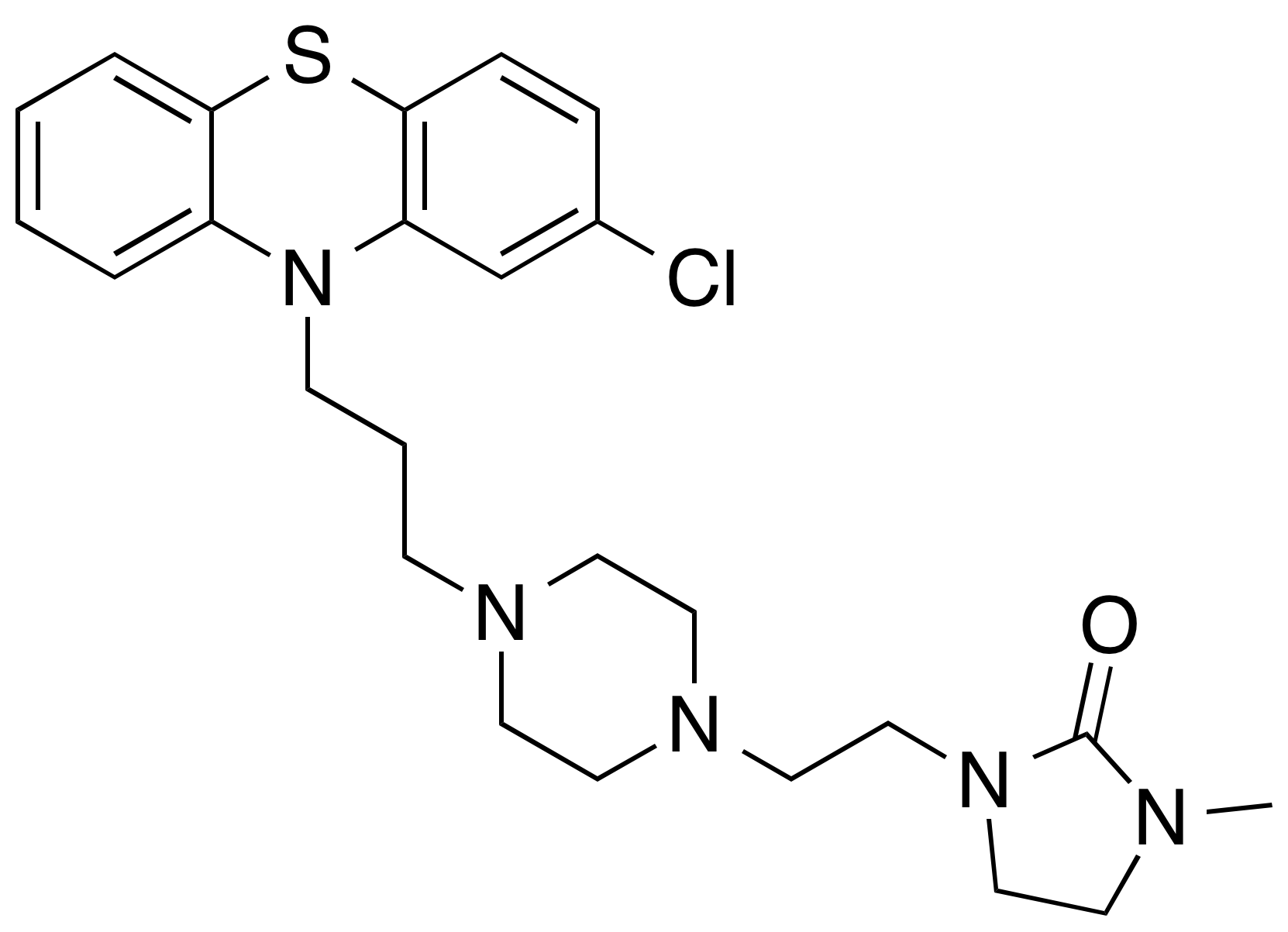

Clinical data
- Trade names: Ponsital
- ATC code: N05AB (WHO)

Legal status
- Legal status: BR: Class C1 (Other controlled substances)

Identifiers
- IUPAC name: 1-[2-[4-[3-(2-chlorophenothiazin-10-yl)propyl]piperazin-1-yl]ethyl]-3-methylimidazolidin-2-one
- CAS Number: 7224-08-0
- PubChem CID: 23896
- DrugBank: DB21337
- ChemSpider: 22341
- UNII: WGL8B3MDAS
- ChEBI: CHEBI:135784
- ChEMBL: ChEMBL2105043
- CompTox Dashboard (EPA): DTXSID60864024

Chemical and physical data
- Formula: C_{25}H_{32}ClN_{5}OS
- Molar mass: 486.08 g·mol^{−1}
- 3D model (JSmol): Interactive image
- SMILES: CN1CCN(C1=O)CCN2CCN(CC2)CCCN3C4=CC=CC=C4SC5=C3C=C(C=C5)Cl
- InChI: InChI=1S/C25H32ClN5OS/c1-27-11-17-30(25(27)32)18-16-29-14-12-28(13-15-29)9-4-10-31-21-5-2-3-6-23(21)33-24-8-7-20(26)19-22(24)31/h2-3,5-8,19H,4,9-18H2,1H3; Key:OCDYNPAUUKDNOR-UHFFFAOYSA-N

Imiclopazine is an antipsychotic drug of the phenothiazines class, developed in the 1960s by the pharmaceutical company Asta-Werke under the brand name Ponsital. It demonstrated strong sedative and antiemetic properties.

It was initially researched for the treatment of schizophrenia and had favorable clinical trials, but ultimately was never brought to market.
