= Benzquinamide =

Chemical compound

Clinical data
- Trade names: Promecon, Quantril, Emete-Con
- License data: US FDA: Quantril
- Routes of administration: Suppository, injection
- ATC code: none

Legal status
- Legal status: BR: Class C1 (Other controlled substances)

Identifiers
- IUPAC name: 3-(Diethylcarbamoyl)-9,10-dimethoxy-1H,2H,3H,4H,6H,7H,11bH-pyrido[2,1-a]isoquinolin-2-yl acetate
- CAS Number: 63-12-7
- IUPHAR/BPS: 7124
- DrugBank: DB00767
- ChemSpider: 2252
- UNII: 0475EA27Q3
- KEGG: D00243
- ChEMBL: ChEMBL1201250
- CompTox Dashboard (EPA): DTXSID9022657

Chemical and physical data
- Formula: C_{22}H_{32}N_{2}O_{5}
- Molar mass: 404.507 g·mol^{−1}
- 3D model (JSmol): Interactive image
- SMILES: CCN(CC)C(=O)C1CN2CCc3cc(OC)c(OC)cc3C2CC1OC(=O)C
- InChI: InChI=InChI=1S/C22H32N2O5/c1-6-23(7-2)22(26)17-13-24-9-8-15-10-20(27-4)21(28-5)11-16(15)18(24)12-19(17)29-14(3)25/h10-11,17-19H,6-9,12-13H2,1-5H3; Key:JSZILQVIPPROJI-UHFFFAOYSA-N

Benzquinamide is a discontinued antiemetic drug used in post-operative care. It was first synthesised by Pfizer in the 1960s.
