= Morpheridine =

Chemical compound

Clinical data
- ATC code: none

Legal status
- Legal status: AU: S9 (Prohibited substance); BR: Class A1 (Narcotic drugs); CA: Schedule I; DE: Anlage I (Authorized scientific use only); UK: Controlled Drug; US: Schedule I; UN: Psychotropic Schedule I

Identifiers
- IUPAC name: ethyl 1-(2-morpholin-4-ylethyl)-4-phenyl-piperidine-4-carboxylate
- CAS Number: 469-81-8
- PubChem CID: 61121
- ChemSpider: 55069
- UNII: 1854GKB41Y
- CompTox Dashboard (EPA): DTXSID20196979
- ECHA InfoCard: 100.006.749

Chemical and physical data
- Formula: C_{20}H_{30}N_{2}O_{3}
- Molar mass: 346.471 g·mol^{−1}
- 3D model (JSmol): Interactive image
- SMILES: O=C(OCC)C3(c1ccccc1)CCN(CCN2CCOCC2)CC3
- InChI: InChI=1S/C20H30N2O3/c1-2-25-19(23)20(18-6-4-3-5-7-18)8-10-21(11-9-20)12-13-22-14-16-24-17-15-22/h3-7H,2,8-17H2,1H3; Key:JDEDMCKQPKGSAX-UHFFFAOYSA-N

Morpheridine (Morpholinoethylnorpethidine) is a 4-phenylpiperidine derivative that is related to the clinically used opioid analgesic drug pethidine (meperidine). It is a strong analgesic with around 4 times the potency of pethidine, and unlike pethidine, does not cause convulsions, although it produces the standard opioid side effects such as sedation and respiratory depression.

Morpheridine is not currently used in medicine and is a Schedule I drug which is controlled under UN drug conventions.

== Synthesis ==
Normeperidine synthesis:

The key intermediate, normeperidine, is obtained by a scheme closely akin to the parent molecule. Thus, alkylation of benzyl cyanide (1) with the tosyl analog of the bischloroethylamine (2) leads to the substituted piperidine (3). Basic hydrolysis serves to convert the nitrile to the acid (4). Treatment of this last with sulfuric acid in ethanol serves both to esterify the acid and to remove the tosyl group to yield the secondary amine (5).

Alkylation of that amine by means of N-(2-chloroethyl)morpholine gives morpheridine.

== See also ==
- Anileridine
- Furethidine
- Carbetidine
