= Methyldesorphine =

Chemical compound

Clinical data
- Other names: 3-Hydroxy-6,N-dimethyl-4,5-epoxymorphin-6-en
- ATC code: none

Legal status
- Legal status: AU: S9 (Prohibited substance); BR: Class A1 (Narcotic drugs); CA: Schedule I; DE: Anlage I (Authorized scientific use only); US: Schedule I

Identifiers
- IUPAC name: (5α)-6,17-Dimethyl-6,7-didehydro-4,5-epoxymorphinan-3-ol
- CAS Number: 16008-36-9
- PubChem CID: 5362518
- ChemSpider: 4515065
- UNII: Y460N7W76B
- KEGG: D12691
- CompTox Dashboard (EPA): DTXSID60166797
- ECHA InfoCard: 100.036.474

Chemical and physical data
- Formula: C_{18}H_{21}NO_{2}
- Molar mass: 283.371 g·mol^{−1}
- 3D model (JSmol): Interactive image
- SMILES: CC1=CC[C@H]2[C@H]3CC4=C5[C@]2([C@H]1OC5=C(C=C4)O)CCN3C
- InChI: InChI=1S/C18H21NO2/c1-10-3-5-12-13-9-11-4-6-14(20)16-15(11)18(12,17(10)21-16)7-8-19(13)2/h3-4,6,12-13,17,20H,5,7-9H2,1-2H3/t12-,13+,17-,18-/m0/s1; Key:CUFWYVOFDYVCPM-GGNLRSJOSA-N

Methyldesorphine is an opioid analgesic. First synthesized in Germany in 1940 and patented in the US in 1952, it has a high potential for abuse as with any potent opioid agonist, and is sometimes found along with desomorphine as a component of the home-made opioid mixture known as "Krokodil" used in Russia and the neighboring former Soviet republics. It is approximately 15 times more potent than morphine as an analgesic, but if the 6-7 bond is saturated, the β isomer is some 50 times more potent than morphine.

Methyldesorphine is listed as a Schedule I Narcotic controlled substance under the Controlled Substances Act 1970 in the United States with a DEA ACSCN of 9302 and zero annual aggregate manufacturing quota. The free base conversion ratio of the hydrochloride is 0.89.

== See also ==
- 6-Methylenedihydrodesoxymorphine
