= Α-Methylacetylfentanyl =

Opioid analgesic

α-Methylacetylfentanyl

Clinical data
- Other names: α-methylacetylfentanyl, acetyl-α-methylfentanyl
- ATC code: none

Legal status
- Legal status: BR: Class F1 (Prohibited narcotics); CA: Schedule I; DE: Anlage I (Authorized scientific use only); UK: Class A; US: Schedule I

Identifiers
- IUPAC name: N-Phenyl-N-[1-(1-phenylpropan-2-yl)-4-piperidyl]acetamide
- CAS Number: 101860-00-8
- PubChem CID: 62307
- DrugBank: DB01532
- ChemSpider: 56102
- UNII: 0O1GKW2BQO
- KEGG: C22791
- CompTox Dashboard (EPA): DTXSID90869365
- ECHA InfoCard: 100.288.948

Chemical and physical data
- Formula: C_{22}H_{28}N_{2}O
- Molar mass: 336.479 g·mol^{−1}
- 3D model (JSmol): Interactive image
- SMILES: O=C(N(c1ccccc1)C3CCN(C(Cc2ccccc2)C)CC3)C
- InChI: InChI=1S/C22H28N2O/c1-18(17-20-9-5-3-6-10-20)23-15-13-22(14-16-23)24(19(2)25)21-11-7-4-8-12-21/h3-12,18,22H,13-17H2,1-2H3; Key:OKTLVZBUKMRPLL-UHFFFAOYSA-N

α-Methylacetylfentanyl (or alphamethylacetylfentanyl) is an opioid analgesic and an analog of fentanyl. It is classified as a Schedule I controlled substance in many jurisdictions.

== History ==
The drug appeared briefly on the black market in the early 1980s, prior to the enactment of the Federal Analog Act, which sought to regulate entire classes of substances based on structural similarity rather than scheduling each one individually as it emerged. Fentanyl analogs have been responsible for hundreds of fatalities across Europe and the former Soviet republics since their re-emergence in Estonia in the early 2000s, and new derivatives continue to appear. In 2013, the Drug Enforcement Administration (DEA) established an aggregate production quota of 2 grams (0.071 oz) for acetyl-alpha-methylfentanyl.

== Pharmacology ==
Pharmacologically, α-methylacetylfentanyl acts as a mu-opioid receptor agonist and produces effects similar to those of fentanyl.

== Adverse effects ==
The adverse effects of fentanyl analogs are also similar to those of fentanyl itself, including itching, nausea, and severe respiratory depression, which may be life-threatening.

== Synthesis ==
α-Methylacetylfentanyl can be synthesized by the same method as α-methylfentanyl, except that the more readily available acetic anhydride is used in place of the less accessible propionic anhydride.
