= Meprodine =

Chemical compound

- Alpha-meprodine

Clinical data
- ATC code: none

Legal status
- Legal status: AU: S9 (Prohibited substance); BR: Class A1 (Narcotic drugs); CA: Schedule I; DE: Anlage I (Authorized scientific use only); US: Schedule I

Identifiers
- IUPAC name: (3S,4R)-3-ethyl-1-methyl-4-phenylpiperidin-4-yl propionate
- CAS Number: 468-51-9
- PubChem CID: 61119
- ChemSpider: 16736823
- UNII: 1177I648L1
- KEGG: D12666
- ChEMBL: ChEMBL2104027

Chemical and physical data
- Formula: C_{17}H_{25}NO_{2}
- Molar mass: 275.392 g·mol^{−1}
- 3D model (JSmol): Interactive image
- SMILES: CC[C@H]1CN(C)CC[C@@]1(OC(=O)CC)c2ccccc2
- InChI: InChI=1S/C17H25NO2/c1-4-14-13-18(3)12-11-17(14,20-16(19)5-2)15-9-7-6-8-10-15/h6-10,14H,4-5,11-13H2,1-3H3/t14-,17-/m0/s1; Key:ODEGQXRCQDVXSJ-YOEHRIQHSA-N

Meprodine is an opioid analgesic that is an analogue of pethidine (meperidine). It is closely related to the drug prodine, the only difference being that meprodine has an ethyl group rather than a methyl at the 3-position of the piperidine ring.

As with prodine, there are two isomers of meprodine, alpha-meprodine and beta-meprodine, with the alpha isomer having been more widely used. Alphameprodine (ACSCN 9604) and betameprodine (ACSCN 9608) are both Schedule I Narcotic controlled substances in the United States, both with annual aggregate manufacturing quotas of 2 grammes as of 2014.

Meprodine has similar effects to other opioids, and produces analgesia, sedation and euphoria. Side effects can include itching, nausea and potentially serious respiratory depression which can be life-threatening.

== Legal Status ==
=== Australia ===
Meprodine is considered a Schedule 9 prohibited substance in Australia under the Poisons Standard (February 2017). A Schedule 9 substance is a substance which may be abused or misused, the manufacture, possession, sale or use of which should be prohibited by law except when required for medical or scientific research, or for analytical, teaching or training purposes with approval of Commonwealth and/or State or Territory Health Authorities.
