= Diethylthiambutene =

Chemical compound

Clinical data
- ATC code: none

Legal status
- Legal status: BR: Class A1 (Narcotic drugs); CA: Schedule I; DE: Anlage I (Authorized scientific use only); US: Schedule I; UN: Psychotropic Schedule I

Identifiers
- IUPAC name: N,N-diethyl-4,4-dithiophen-2-yl-but-3-en-2-amine
- CAS Number: 86-14-6
- PubChem CID: 6833
- DrugBank: DB01533
- ChemSpider: 6572
- UNII: 2Z91X9052O
- KEGG: D12664
- ChEMBL: ChEMBL2106573
- CompTox Dashboard (EPA): DTXSID30861666

Chemical and physical data
- Formula: C_{16}H_{21}NS_{2}
- Molar mass: 291.47 g·mol^{−1}
- 3D model (JSmol): Interactive image
- Melting point: 152 to 153 °C (306 to 307 °F)
- SMILES: CCN(CC)C(C)C=C(C1=CC=CS1)C2=CC=CS2
- InChI: InChI=1S/C16H21NS2/c1-4-17(5-2)13(3)12-14(15-8-6-10-18-15)16-9-7-11-19-16/h6-13H,4-5H2,1-3H3; Key:CBYWMRHUUVRIAF-UHFFFAOYSA-N

Diethylthiambutene (Thiambutene, Themalon, Diethibutin, N,N-Diethyl-1-methyl-3,3-di-2-thienylallylamine) is an opioid analgesic drug developed in the 1950s which was mainly used as an anesthetic in veterinary medicine and continues, along with the other two thiambutenes dimethylthiambutene and ethylmethylthiambutene to be used for this purpose, particularly in Japan. It is now under international control under Schedule I of the UN Single Convention On Narcotic Drugs 1961, presumably due to high abuse potential, although little more information is available. It is listed under Schedule I of the US Controlled Substances Act as a Narcotic and has an ACSCN of 9616 with zero annual manufacturing quota as of 2013.

== Synthesis ==
Synthesis: Japan patents:

The conjugate addition of diethylamine [109-89-7] to ethyl crotonate [623-70-1] [10544-63-5] (1) gives ethyl 3-(diethylamino)butanoate, CID:10679145 (2). Addition of two equivalents of 2-thienyllithium to the ester gives the tertiary alcohol [94094-46-9] (4'). The dehydration of this then completes the synthesis of diethylthiambutene (5').
