= Norpipanone =

Opioid analgesic drug

Clinical data
- Other names: Herchst 10495, NIH-7557
- ATC code: None

Legal status
- Legal status: AU: S9 (Prohibited substance); BR: Class A1 (Narcotic drugs); CA: Schedule I; DE: Anlage I (Authorized scientific use only); US: Schedule I

Identifiers
- IUPAC name: 4,4-diphenyl-6-(1-piperidinyl)-3-hexanone
- CAS Number: 561-48-8
- PubChem CID: 22391
- ChemSpider: 21015
- UNII: 127X8DJ74M
- KEGG: D12701
- CompTox Dashboard (EPA): DTXSID60204643
- ECHA InfoCard: 100.008.383

Chemical and physical data
- Formula: C_{23}H_{29}NO
- Molar mass: 335.491 g·mol^{−1}
- 3D model (JSmol): Interactive image
- SMILES: O=C(C(c1ccccc1)(c2ccccc2)CCN3CCCCC3)CC
- InChI: InChI=1S/C23H29NO/c1-2-22(25)23(20-12-6-3-7-13-20,21-14-8-4-9-15-21)16-19-24-17-10-5-11-18-24/h3-4,6-9,12-15H,2,5,10-11,16-19H2,1H3; Key:WCDSHELZWCOTMI-UHFFFAOYSA-N

Norpipanone (INN, BAN; Hexalgon) is an opioid analgesic related to methadone which was developed in Germany and distributed in Hungary, Argentina, and other countries. It had originally not been under international control but upon observation of case reports of addiction it was reviewed and shortly thereafter became a controlled substance. In the United States, it is a Schedule I controlled substance (ACSCN 9636, zero annual manufacturing quota as of 2014). The salts in use are the hydrobromide (free base conversion ratio 0.806) and hydrochloride (0.902).

== Synthesis ==
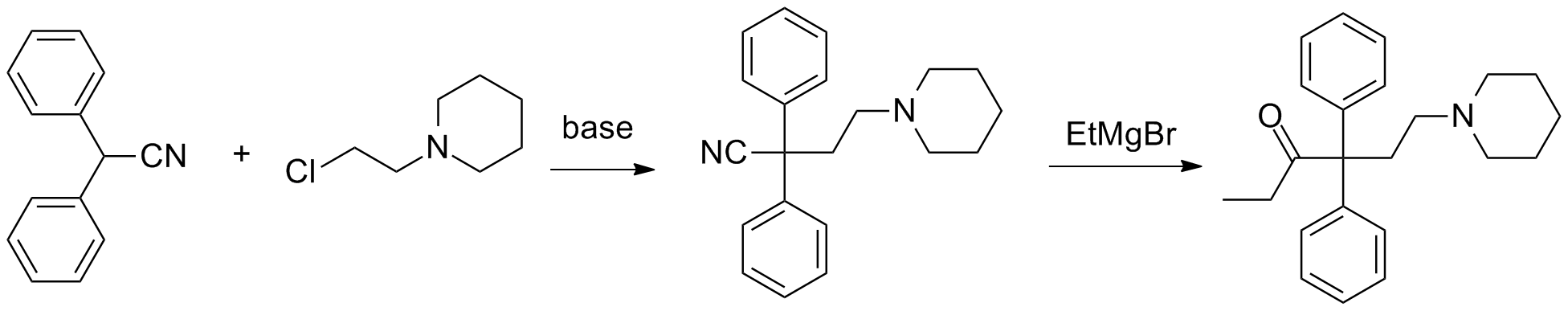
Norpipanone synthesis:

== See also ==
- Dipipanone
- Normethadone
