= Benzethidine =

Chemical compound

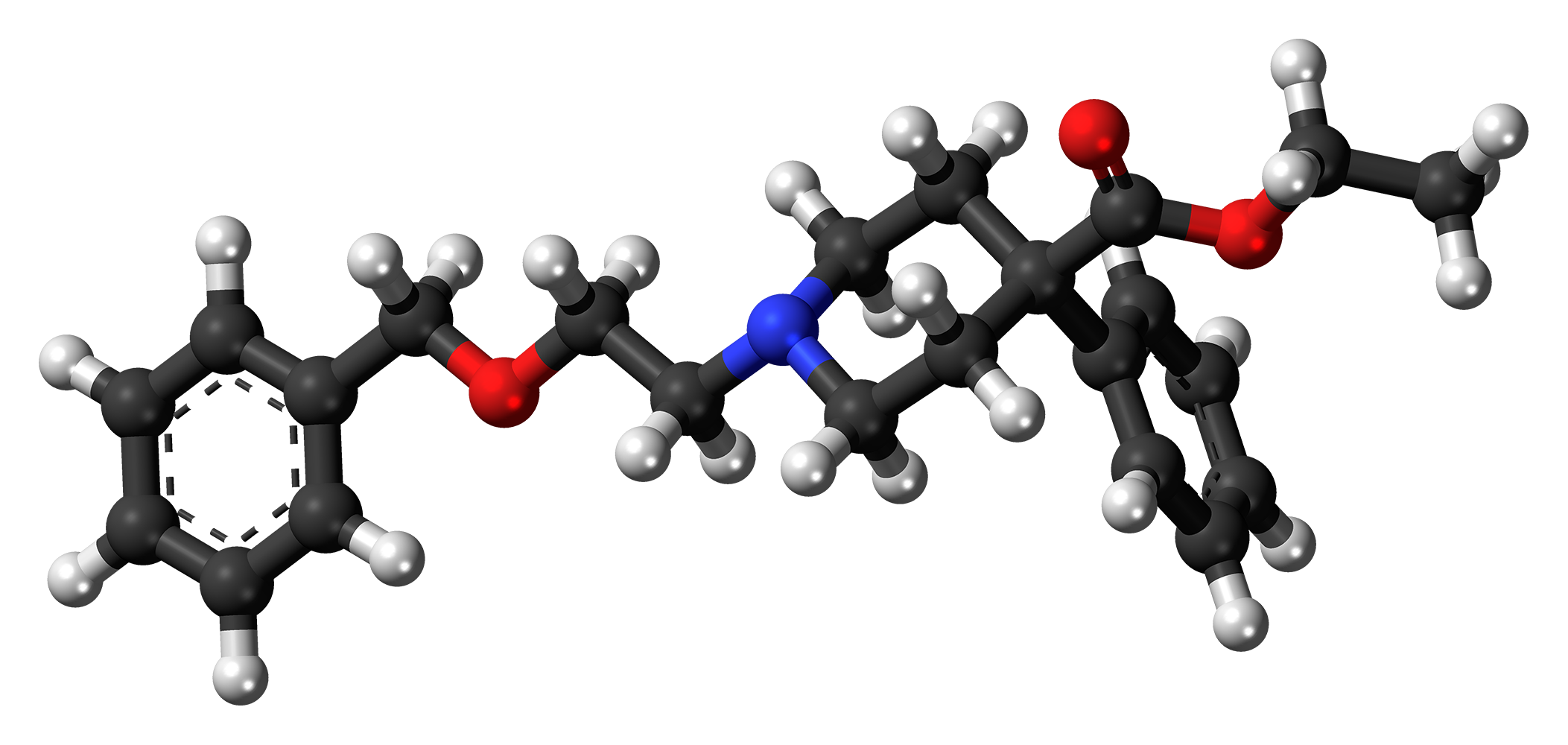

Clinical data
- ATC code: none

Legal status
- Legal status: AU: S9 (Prohibited substance); BR: Class A1 (Narcotic drugs); CA: Schedule I; DE: Anlage I (Authorized scientific use only); UK: Class A; US: Schedule I

Identifiers
- IUPAC name: ethyl 1-[2-(benzyloxy)ethyl]- 4-phenylpiperidine- 4-carboxylate
- CAS Number: 3691-78-9
- PubChem CID: 62516
- DrugBank: DB01518
- ChemSpider: 56290
- UNII: X0I74BAR02
- KEGG: D12685
- ChEMBL: ChEMBL2104234
- CompTox Dashboard (EPA): DTXSID50190389

Chemical and physical data
- Formula: C_{23}H_{29}NO_{3}
- Molar mass: 367.489 g·mol^{−1}
- 3D model (JSmol): Interactive image
- SMILES: O=C(OCC)C3(c1ccccc1)CCN(CCOCc2ccccc2)CC3
- InChI: InChI=1S/C23H29NO3/c1-2-27-22(25)23(21-11-7-4-8-12-21)13-15-24(16-14-23)17-18-26-19-20-9-5-3-6-10-20/h3-12H,2,13-19H2,1H3; Key:UVTBZAWTRVBTMK-UHFFFAOYSA-N

Benzethidine is a 4-phenylpiperidine derivative that is related to the clinically used opioid analgesic drug pethidine (meperidine, or Demerol).

Benzethidine is not currently used in medicine and is a Class A/Schedule I drug which is controlled under UN drug conventions. It has similar effects to other opioid derivatives, such as analgesia, sedation, nausea and respiratory depression. In the United States, the drug is a Schedule I Narcotic Controlled Substance with a DEA ACSCN of 9606 and 2014 annual aggregate manufacturing quota of nil. The most common salt in use is the hydrochloride, free base conversion ratio of 0.910.

== Legal Status ==
=== Australia ===
Benzethidine is considered a Schedule 9 prohibited substance in Australia under the Poisons Standard (February 2017). A Schedule 9 substance is a substance which may be abused or misused, the manufacture, possession, sale or use of which should be prohibited by law except when required for medical or scientific research, or for analytical, teaching or training purposes with approval of Commonwealth and/or State or Territory Health Authorities.
