= Amfepramone =

Stimulant drug used as an appetite suppressant

Clinical data
- Trade names: Tenuate, Tepanil, Nobesine, others
- Other names: Diethylpropion, Diethylcathinone
- AHFS/Drugs.com: Monograph
- MedlinePlus: a682037
- License data: US DailyMed: Diethylpropion
- Pregnancy category: AU: B2
- Routes of administration: By mouth
- ATC code: A08AA03 (WHO)

Legal status
- Legal status: AU: S4 (Prescription only); BR: Class B2 (Anorectic drugs); CA: Schedule G (CDSA IV); DE: Prescription only (Anlage III for higher doses); UK: Class C; US: Schedule IV; EU: Rx-only

Pharmacokinetic data
- Elimination half-life: 4–6 hours (metabolites)
- Excretion: Urine (>75%)

Identifiers
- IUPAC name: (RS)-2-diethylamino-1-phenylpropan-1-one
- CAS Number: 90-84-6
- PubChem CID: 7029
- IUPHAR/BPS: 7161
- DrugBank: DB00937
- ChemSpider: 6762
- UNII: Q94YYU22B8
- KEGG: D07444
- ChEBI: CHEBI:4530
- ChEMBL: ChEMBL1194666
- CompTox Dashboard (EPA): DTXSID6022929
- ECHA InfoCard: 100.001.836

Chemical and physical data
- Formula: C_{13}H_{19}NO
- Molar mass: 205.301 g·mol^{−1}
- 3D model (JSmol): Interactive image
- Chirality: Racemic mixture
- SMILES: O=C(c1ccccc1)C(N(CC)CC)C
- InChI: InChI=1S/C13H19NO/c1-4-14(5-2)11(3)13(15)12-9-7-6-8-10-12/h6-11H,4-5H2,1-3H3; Key:XXEPPPIWZFICOJ-UHFFFAOYSA-N

Amfepramone, also known as diethylpropion, is a stimulant drug of the phenethylamine, amphetamine, and cathinone classes that is used as an appetite suppressant. It is used in the short-term management of obesity, along with dietary and lifestyle changes. Amfepramone has a similar chemical structure to the antidepressant and smoking cessation aid bupropion (previously called amfebutamone), which has also been developed as a weight-loss medicine when in a combination product with naltrexone.

== Pharmacology ==
Amfepramone itself lacks any affinity for the monoamine transporters and instead functions as a prodrug to ethcathinone. Ethcathinone (and therefore amfepramone as well) is a very weak dopaminergic and serotonergic, and is approximately 10× and 20× stronger on norepinephrine in comparison, respectively.

== Chemistry ==
Amfepramone can be synthesized from propiophenone by bromination, followed by reaction with diethylamine.

== Society and culture ==
=== Names ===
Another medically utilized name is diethylpropion (British Approved Name (BAN) and Australian Approved Name (AAN)). Chemical names include: α-methyl-β-keto-N,N-diethylphenethylamine, N,N-diethyl-β-ketoamphetamine and N,N-diethylcathinone. Brand names include: Anorex, Linea, Nobesine, Prefamone, Regenon, Tepanil and Tenuate.

=== Legal status ===
Amfepramone is classified as a Schedule IV controlled substance in the United States. In the UK amfepramone is a class C drug and as a medicine, it is a Schedule 3 Controlled Drug which requires safe custody.

As of June 2022, the safety committee of the European Medicines Agency (EMA) recommends the withdrawal of marketing authorizations for amfepramone.

=== Recreational use ===
The authors of several studies of amfepramone claim that the substance has a relatively low potential for causing addiction in users.
