= Thiofentanyl =

Opioid

Clinical data
- Pregnancy category: C
- ATC code: none

Legal status
- Legal status: AU: S9 (Prohibited substance); BR: Class F1 (Prohibited narcotics); CA: Schedule I; DE: Anlage I (Authorized scientific use only); UK: Class A; US: Schedule I

Identifiers
- IUPAC name: N-phenyl-N-{1-[2-(2-thienyl)ethyl]piperidin-4-yl}propanamide
- CAS Number: 1165-22-6
- PubChem CID: 62380
- ChemSpider: 56168
- UNII: 954535Y32Y
- KEGG: C22739
- ChEBI: CHEBI:61099
- CompTox Dashboard (EPA): DTXSID00151400

Chemical and physical data
- Formula: C_{20}H_{26}N_{2}OS
- Molar mass: 342.50 g·mol^{−1}
- 3D model (JSmol): Interactive image
- SMILES: O=C(CC)N(C1CCN(CCC2=CC=CS2)CC1)C3=CC=CC=C3
- InChI: InChI=1S/C20H26N2OS/c1-2-20(23)22(17-7-4-3-5-8-17)18-10-13-21(14-11-18)15-12-19-9-6-16-24-19/h3-9,16,18H,2,10-15H2,1H3; Key:YMRFZDHYDKZXPA-UHFFFAOYSA-N

Thiofentanyl is an opioid analgesic that is an analogue of fentanyl.

Thiofentanyl was sold briefly on the black market in the early 1980s, before the introduction of the Federal Analog Act which for the first time attempted to control entire families of drugs based on their structural similarity rather than scheduling each drug individually as they appeared. Thiofentanyl is made with the same synthetic route as fentanyl, but by substituting 2-(2-bromoethyl)thiophene for phenethyl bromide in the synthesis.

Side effects of fentanyl analogs are similar to those of fentanyl itself, which include itching, nausea and potentially serious respiratory depression, which can be life-threatening. Fentanyl analogs have killed hundreds of people throughout Europe and the former Soviet republics since the most recent resurgence in use began in Estonia in the early 2000s, and novel derivatives continue to appear.
