= Haloxazolam =

Benzodiazepine

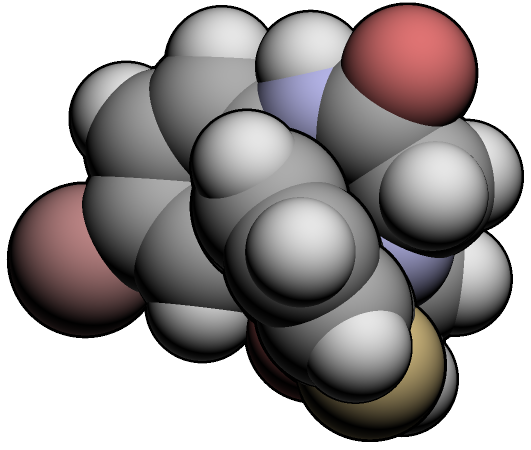

Clinical data
- Trade names: Somelin (JP)
- AHFS/Drugs.com: International Drug Names
- Routes of administration: Oral
- ATC code: none

Legal status
- Legal status: BR: Class B1 (Psychoactive drugs); CA: Schedule IV; DE: Anlage III (Special prescription form required); US: Schedule IV

Pharmacokinetic data
- Metabolism: Hepatic
- Excretion: Renal

Identifiers
- IUPAC name: 10-bromo-11b-(2-fluorophenyl)-2,3,5,7-tetrahydro-[1,3]oxazolo[3,2-d][1,4]benzodiazepin-6-one
- CAS Number: 59128-97-1
- PubChem CID: 3563
- DrugBank: DB01476
- ChemSpider: 3442
- UNII: M448L2V8XP
- KEGG: D01758
- ChEMBL: ChEMBL2104461
- CompTox Dashboard (EPA): DTXSID60866740

Chemical and physical data
- Formula: C_{17}H_{14}BrFN_{2}O_{2}
- Molar mass: 377.213 g·mol^{−1}
- 3D model (JSmol): Interactive image
- SMILES: Fc1ccccc1C42OCCN2CC(=O)Nc3c4cc(Br)cc3
- InChI: InChI=1S/C17H14BrFN2O2/c18-11-5-6-15-13(9-11)17(12-3-1-2-4-14(12)19)21(7-8-23-17)10-16(22)20-15/h1-6,9H,7-8,10H2,(H,20,22); Key:XDKCGKQHVBOOHC-UHFFFAOYSA-N

Haloxazolam (marketed in Japan under the brand name Somelin), is a drug which is a benzodiazepine derivative. It has similar hypnotic properties as the benzodiazepine drugs triazolam, temazepam, and flunitrazepam and as such is indicated for the treatment of insomnia. A study in cats comparing estazolam and haloxazolam found that haloxazolam only affects gamma motor neurons, whereas estazolam affects both alpha and gamma motor neurons. Chemically, it is an oxazolobenzodiazepine.

== See also ==
- Benzodiazepine
