= Oxazolam =

Tranquilizer medication, mixture of isomers

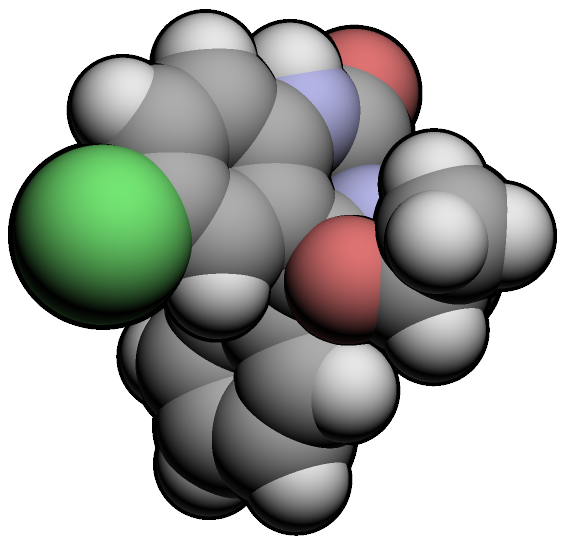

Clinical data
- Other names: Oxazolazepam
- AHFS/Drugs.com: International Drug Names

Legal status
- Legal status: BR: Class B1 (Psychoactive drugs); CA: Schedule IV; DE: Prescription only (Anlage III for higher doses); US: Schedule IV

Identifiers
- IUPAC name: (2R,11bS)-10-chloro-2-methyl-11b-phenyl-2,3,5,7-tetrahydro-[1,3]oxazolo[3,2-d][1,4]benzodiazepin-6-one
- CAS Number: 24143-17-7
- PubChem CID: 4617
- ChemSpider: 56519
- UNII: 1V2WI2NA1C
- KEGG: D01278
- CompTox Dashboard (EPA): DTXSID5023401

Chemical and physical data
- Formula: C_{18}H_{17}ClN_{2}O_{2}
- Molar mass: 328.80 g·mol^{−1}
- 3D model (JSmol): Interactive image
- SMILES: Clc2ccc1NC(=O)CN3C[C@H](O[C@]3(c1c2)c4ccccc4)C
- InChI: InChI=1S/C18H17ClN2O2/c1-12-10-21-11-17(22)20-16-8-7-14(19)9-15(16)18(21,23-12)13-5-3-2-4-6-13/h2-9,12H,10-11H2,1H3,(H,20,22)/t12-,18+/m1/s1; Key:VCCZBYPHZRWKFY-XIKOKIGWSA-N

Oxazolam is a drug that is a benzodiazepine derivative. It has anxiolytic, anticonvulsant, sedative, and skeletal muscle relaxant properties. It is a prodrug for desmethyldiazepam.

== See also ==
- Benzodiazepine
