= Codoxime =

Chemical compound

Clinical data
- Other names: Codoxime
- ATC code: none

Legal status
- Legal status: BR: Class A1 (Narcotic drugs); CA: Schedule I; DE: Anlage I (Authorized scientific use only); UN: Narcotic Schedule I

Identifiers
- IUPAC name: (((4,5α-Epoxy-3-methoxy-17-methylmorphinan-6-ylidene)amino)oxy)acetic acid
- CAS Number: 7125-76-0
- PubChem CID: 9570253
- ChemSpider: 7844721
- UNII: JT5I2F57F7
- KEGG: D03581
- ChEMBL: ChEMBL2107300
- ECHA InfoCard: 100.027.660

Chemical and physical data
- Formula: C_{20}H_{24}N_{2}O_{5}
- Molar mass: 372.421 g·mol^{−1}
- 3D model (JSmol): Interactive image
- SMILES: O=C(O)CO\N=C4\[C@@H]5Oc1c2c(ccc1OC)C[C@H]3N(CC[C@]25[C@H]3CC4)C

Codoxime (Codossima) is an opiate analogue that is a derivative of hydrocodone, where the 6-ketone group has been replaced by carboxymethyloxime. It has primarily antitussive effects and was found to have moderate potential to cause dependence in animal studies.
