= Etoxeridine =

Chemical compound

Clinical data
- Other names: Etoxeridine, Carbetidine, Atenos
- ATC code: none

Legal status
- Legal status: AU: S9 (Prohibited substance); BR: Class A1 (Narcotic drugs); CA: Schedule I; DE: Anlage I (Authorized scientific use only); UK: Class A; US: Schedule I

Identifiers
- IUPAC name: Ethyl 1-[2-(2-hydroxyethoxy)ethyl]-4-phenylpiperidine-4-carboxylate
- CAS Number: 469-82-9
- PubChem CID: 61122
- DrugBank: DB01505
- ChemSpider: 55070
- UNII: RHW35E1G7E
- KEGG: D12680
- ChEMBL: ChEMBL2104254
- CompTox Dashboard (EPA): DTXSID30196980
- ECHA InfoCard: 100.006.750

Chemical and physical data
- Formula: C_{18}H_{27}NO_{4}
- Molar mass: 321.417 g·mol^{−1}
- 3D model (JSmol): Interactive image
- SMILES: C1(CCN(CC1)CCOCCO)(C(=O)OCC)C2=CC=CC=C2
- InChI: InChI=1S/C18H27NO4/c1-2-23-17(21)18(16-6-4-3-5-7-16)8-10-19(11-9-18)12-14-22-15-13-20/h3-7,20H,2,8-15H2,1H3; Key:KJTKYGFGPQSRRA-UHFFFAOYSA-N

Etoxeridine (Carbetidine, Atenos) is a 4-phenylpiperidine derivative that is related to the clinically used opioid analgesic drug pethidine (meperidine).

Etoxeridine was developed in the 1950s and investigated for use in surgical anesthesia, however it was never commercialized and is not currently used in medicine. As with other opioids which were not in clinical use during the drafting of the Controlled Substances Act, it is categorized as a Schedule I narcotic.
