= Prodine =

Opioid analgesic

- Skeletal formula of prodine

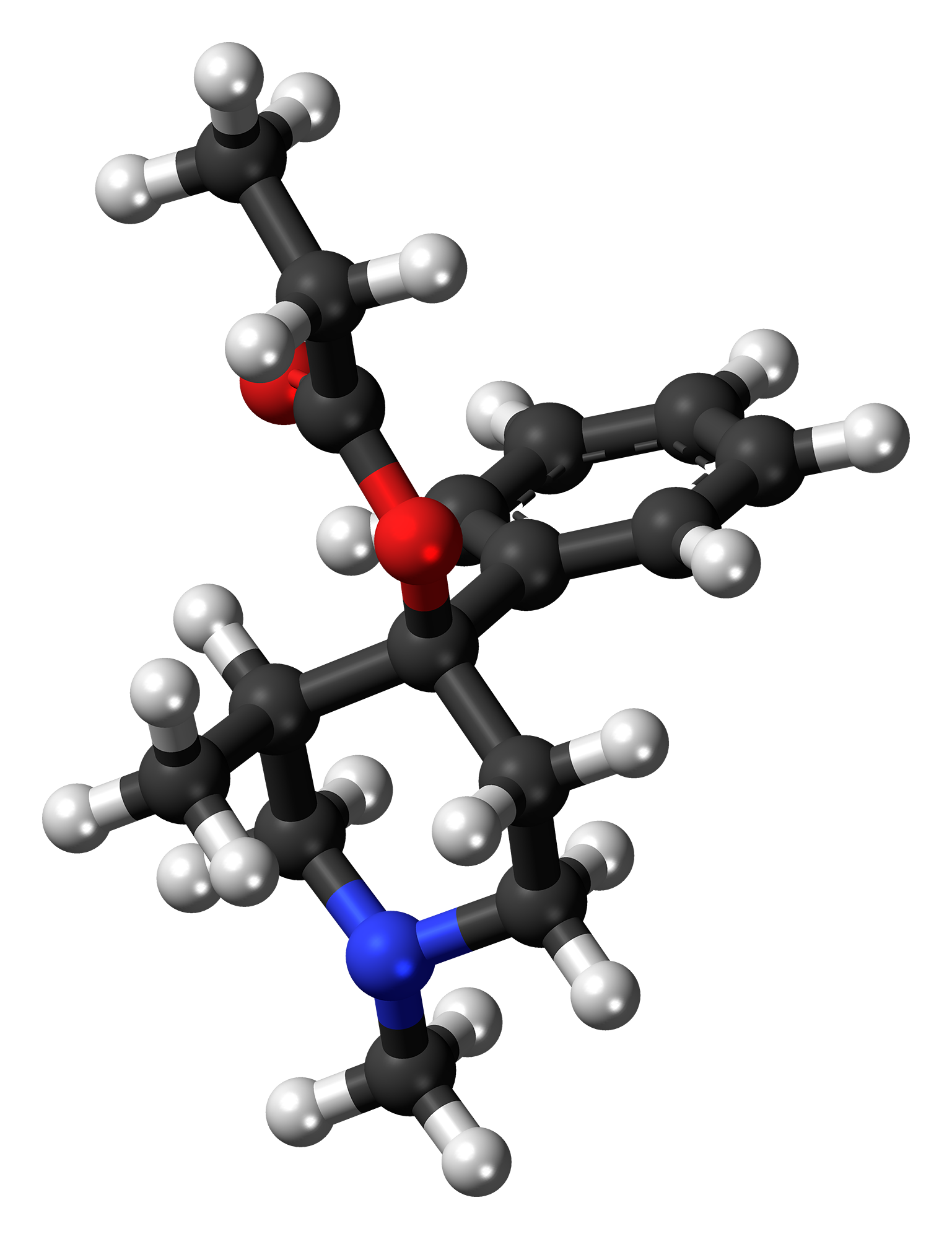
- Ball-and-stick model of the alphaprodine molecule

Clinical data
- ATC code: none

Legal status
- Legal status: AU: S8 (Controlled drug); BR: Class A1 (Narcotic drugs); DE: Anlage I (Authorized scientific use only); US: Schedule I; In general: ℞ (Prescription only)

Identifiers
- IUPAC name: (1,3-Dimethyl-4-phenylpiperidin-4-yl) propanoate
- CAS Number: 77-20-3 (alpha); 468-59-7 (beta)
- PubChem CID: 204163
- ChemSpider: 176845
- UNII: 001O2254AC; 21J54X4Z4Z
- KEGG: D12678; D12679
- ChEMBL: ChEMBL14309
- CompTox Dashboard (EPA): DTXSID70859103

Chemical and physical data
- Formula: C_{16}H_{23}NO_{2}
- Molar mass: 261.365 g·mol^{−1}
- 3D model (JSmol): Interactive image
- SMILES: O=C(CC)O[C@]1(CCN(C[C@H]1C)C)C2=CC=CC=C2
- InChI: InChI=1S/C16H23NO2/c1-4-15(18)19-16(14-8-6-5-7-9-14)10-11-17(3)12-13(16)2/h5-9,13H,4,10-12H2,1-3H3/t13-,16+/m1/s1; Key:UVAZQQHAVMNMHE-CJNGLKHVSA-N

Prodine (trade names Prisilidine and Nisentil) is an opioid analgesic that is an analog of pethidine (meperidine). It was developed in Germany in the late 1940s.

There are two isomers of the trans form of prodine, alphaprodine and betaprodine. Both exhibit optical isomerism and alphaprodine and betaprodine are racemates. Alphaprodine is closely related to desomorphine in steric configuration. The cis form also has active isomers but none are used in medicine. Betaprodine is around five times more potent than alphaprodine but is metabolized more rapidly, and only alphaprodine was developed for medicinal use. It has similar activity to pethidine, but with a more rapid onset and shorter duration of effects. Betaprodine produces more euphoria and side effects than alphaprodine at all dose levels, and it was found that 5 to 10 mg of betaprodine is equivalent to 25 to 40 mg of alphaprodine.

Testing in rats showed alphaprodine to be 97% the strength of morphine via the subcutaneous route and 140% the strength of oral methadone. Betaprodine was 550% stronger than morphine SC, the laevorotatory cis isomer was 350% stronger, and the dextrorotatory cis isomer was 790% stronger. Betaprodine taken orally was 420% stronger than oral methadone, the cis form was 390% stronger for the laevorotatory and 505% stronger for the dextrorotatory isomers.

Alphaprodine was sold under several brand names, mainly Nisentil and Prisilidine. It was most commonly used for pain relief during childbirth and dentistry, as well as for some minor surgical procedures. Alphaprodine has a duration of action of 1 to 2 hours, and 40 to 60 mg is equivalent to 10 mg of subcutaneous morphine.

Prodine has broadly similar effects to other opioids, producing analgesia, sedation and euphoria. Side effects can include excessive itching, nausea, vomiting and potentially serious respiratory depression which can lead to life-threatening respiratory arrest. Respiratory depression can be a problem with alphaprodine even at normal therapeutic doses. Unlike pethidine, prodine does not produce toxic metabolites and is therefore more suitable for high-dose therapy.

== Regulation ==
Alphaprodine has a DEA ACSCN of 9010 and 2013 manufacturing quota of 3 grams; betaprodine has an ACSCN of 9611 and a 2 grams quota.

== See also ==
- Proheptazine
- Trimeperidine
