= Ethylmethylthiambutene =

Chemical compound

Clinical data
- ATC code: none

Legal status
- Legal status: BR: Class A1 (Narcotic drugs); CA: Schedule I; DE: Anlage I (Authorized scientific use only); US: Schedule I

Identifiers
- IUPAC name: N-ethyl-N-methyl-4,4-dithiophen-2-yl-but-3-en-2-amine
- CAS Number: 441-61-2
- PubChem CID: 46424
- DrugBank: DB01468
- ChemSpider: 42256
- UNII: 722BFZ899Q
- KEGG: D12663
- CompTox Dashboard (EPA): DTXSID60861937
- ECHA InfoCard: 100.006.482

Chemical and physical data
- Formula: C_{15}H_{19}NS_{2}
- Molar mass: 277.44 g·mol^{−1}
- 3D model (JSmol): Interactive image
- SMILES: CCN(C)C(C)C=C(C1=CC=CS1)C2=CC=CS2
- InChI: InChI=1S/C15H19NS2/c1-4-16(3)12(2)11-13(14-7-5-9-17-14)15-8-6-10-18-15/h5-12H,4H2,1-3H3; Key:MORSAEFGQPDBKM-UHFFFAOYSA-N

Ethylmethylthiambutene (N-ethyl-N-methyl-1-methyl-3,3-di-2-thienylallylamine; Emethibutin) is an opioid analgesic drug from the thiambutene family, around 1.3x the potency of morphine. It is under international control under Schedule I of the UN Single Convention On Narcotic Drugs 1961, presumably due to high abuse potential.

It is a Schedule I controlled substance in the United States with a DEA ACSCN of 9623 and zero annual manufacturing quota as of 2013.
