= Furethidine =

Chemical compound

Clinical data
- Other names: ethyl 4-phenyl-1-(2-tetrahydrofurfuryloxyethyl)piperidine-4-carboxylate
- ATC code: none

Legal status
- Legal status: AU: S9 (Prohibited substance); BR: Class A1 (Narcotic drugs); CA: Schedule I; DE: Anlage I (Authorized scientific use only); UK: Class A; US: Schedule I

Identifiers
- IUPAC name: ethyl 1-[2-(oxolan-2-ylmethoxy)ethyl]-4-phenylpiperidine-4-carboxylate
- CAS Number: 2385-81-1
- PubChem CID: 61306
- DrugBank: DB01464
- ChemSpider: 55245
- UNII: 6U9XA4JOD4
- KEGG: D12682
- ChEMBL: ChEMBL2105078
- CompTox Dashboard (EPA): DTXSID10862914
- ECHA InfoCard: 100.017.451

Chemical and physical data
- Formula: C_{21}H_{31}NO_{4}
- Molar mass: 361.482 g·mol^{−1}
- 3D model (JSmol): Interactive image
- SMILES: O=C(OCC)C3(c1ccccc1)CCN(CCOCC2OCCC2)CC3
- InChI: InChI=1S/C21H31NO4/c1-2-25-20(23)21(18-7-4-3-5-8-18)10-12-22(13-11-21)14-16-24-17-19-9-6-15-26-19/h3-5,7-8,19H,2,6,9-17H2,1H3; Key:NNCOZXNZFLUYGG-UHFFFAOYSA-N

Furethidine is a 4-phenylpiperidine derivative that is related to the clinically used opioid analgesic drug pethidine (meperidine), but with around 25x higher potency. According to another source, Furethidine is 500/30 = 16.7 x the potency of pethidine (table VII).

Furethidine is not currently used in medicine and is a Class A/Schedule I drug which is controlled under UN drug conventions. It has similar effects to other opioid derivatives, such as analgesia, sedation, nausea and respiratory depression. In the United States it is a Schedule I Narcotic controlled substance with the ACSCN of 9626.
