= Morphine methylbromide =

Chemical compound

Clinical data
- Other names: Morphine bromomethylate; Morphine methobromide; Morphosan

Legal status
- Legal status: UK: Class A; US: Schedule I

Identifiers
- IUPAC name: (5α,6α)-3,6-Dihydroxy-17,17-dimethyl-7,8-didehydro-4,5-epoxymorphinan-17-ium bromide
- CAS Number: 125-23-5
- PubChem CID: 5362445
- ChemSpider: 4515037
- UNII: 1A51P5NGGU
- CompTox Dashboard (EPA): DTXSID90924983

Chemical and physical data
- Formula: C_{18}H_{22}BrNO_{3}
- Molar mass: 380.282 g·mol^{−1}
- 3D model (JSmol): Interactive image
- SMILES: [H][C@]1([C@@H](O)C=C2)[C@]([C@]2([H])[C@H]3C4)(CC[N+]3(C)C)C5=C4C=CC(O)=C5O1.[Br-]
- InChI: InChI=1S/C18H21NO3.BrH/c1-19(2)8-7-18-11-4-6-14(21)17(18)22-16-13(20)5-3-10(15(16)18)9-12(11)19;/h3-6,11-12,14,17,21H,7-9H2,1-2H3;1H/t11-,12+,14-,17-,18-;/m0./s1; Key:KQUQZJSQMSHWHP-SCLAZZCHSA-N

Morphine methylbromide (morphine methobromide, morphine bromomethylate, morphosan) a derivative of morphine. It is a narcotic opioid listed as a Schedule I controlled substance with an ACSCN of 9305 and a 2014 aggregate national production quota of 5 grams. It is a quaternary ammonium salt formed by reaction of morphine with methyl bromide.
