= List of Schedule II controlled substances (U.S.) =

This is the list of Schedule II controlled substances in the United States as defined by the Controlled Substances Act. The following findings are required, by section 202 of that Act, for substances to be placed in this schedule:

1. The drug or other substance has a high potential for abuse.
2. The drug or other substance has a currently (Note: The use of the term "currently" in Wikipedia is deprecated per MOS:RELTIME, however its presence here is a direct quotation of the referenced Act.) accepted medical use in treatment in the United States or a currently accepted medical use with severe restrictions.
3. Abuse of the drug or other substances may lead to severe psychological or physical dependence.

The complete list of Schedule II substances is as follows. The Administrative Controlled Substances Code Number and Federal Register citation for each substance is included.

== Drugs ==
ACSCN	Class	Drug
9050	opiate	Codeine
9334	opiate	Dihydroetorphine
9190	opiate	Ethylmorphine
9059	opiate	Etorphine hydrochloride
9640	opiate	Granulated opium
9193	opiate	Hydrocodone
9150	opiate	Hydromorphone
9260	opiate	Metopon
9300	opiate	Morphine
9668	opiate	Noroxymorphone
9610	opiate	Opium extracts
9620	opiate	Opium fluid
9330	opiate	Oripavine
9143	opiate	Oxycodone
9652	opiate	Oxymorphone
9639	opiate	Powdered opium
9600	opiate	Raw opium
9333	opiate	Thebaine
9630	opiate	Tincture of opium
9650 (Note: This (previously) missing info was found by reverse searching the info still listed on the page.)	opiate	Opium poppy and poppy straw (Note: This substance was expressly scheduled by the Controlled Substances Act on October 27, 1970. The 1974 Federal Register ruling (by Administrator John R. Bartels, Jr.) merely organized its listing in the Code of Federal Regulations.)
9040	stimulant	Coca, leaves and any salt, compound, derivative or preparation of coca leaves
9041	stimulant	Cocaine, and its salts, isomers, derivatives and salts of isomers and derivatives
9180	stimulant	Ecgonine, and its salts, isomers, derivatives and salts of isomers and derivatives
9670	opiate	Concentrate of poppy straw (the crude extract of poppy straw in either liquid, solid or powder form which contains the phenanthrene alkaloids of the opium poppy)
9737	opiate	Alfentanil
9010	opiate	Alphaprodine
9020	opiate	Anileridine
9800	opiate	Bezitramide
9273	opiate	Bulk dextropropoxyphene (non-dosage forms)
9743	opiate	Carfentanil
9120	opiate	Dihydrocodeine
9170	opiate	Diphenoxylate
9801	opiate	Fentanyl
9226	opiate	Isomethadone
9648	opiate	Levo-alphacetylmethadol
9210	opiate	Levomethorphan
9220	opiate	Levorphanol
9240	opiate	Metazocine
9250	opiate	Methadone
9254	opiate	Methadone intermediate
9802	opiate	Moramide intermediate
9245	opiate	Oliceridine
9230	opiate	Pethidine (meperidine)
9232	opiate	Pethidine intermediate A
9233	opiate	Pethidine intermediate B
9234	opiate	Pethidine intermediate C
9715	opiate	Phenazocine
9730	opiate	Piminodine
9732	opiate	Racemethorphan
9733	opiate	Racemorphan
9739	opiate	Remifentanil
9740	opiate	Sufentanil
9780	opiate	Tapentadol
9729	opiate	Thiafentanil
1100	stimulant	Amphetamine, its salts, optical isomers, and salts of its optical isomers
1105	stimulant	Methamphetamine, its salts, optical isomers, and salts of optical isomers
1631	stimulant	Phenmetrazine and its salts
1724	stimulant	Methylphenidate
1205	stimulant	Lisdexamfetamine, its salts, isomers, and salts of its isomers
2125	depressant	Amobarbital
2550	depressant	Glutethimide
2270	depressant	Pentobarbital / Nembutal
7471	depressant	Phencyclidine
2315	depressant	Secobarbital
7379	hallucinogen	Nabilone
7365	hallucinogen	Dronabinol oral solution
8501	precursor	Phenylacetone
7460	precursor	1-phenylcyclohexylamine
8603	precursor	1-piperidinocyclohexanecarbonitrile (PCC)
8333	precursor	4-anilino-N-phenethyl-4-piperidine (4-ANPP)
8366	precursor	Norfentanyl

== See also ==
- List of Schedule I controlled substances (U.S.)
- List of Schedule III controlled substances (U.S.)
- List of Schedule IV controlled substances (U.S.)
- List of Schedule V controlled substances (U.S.)
