= Title 21 of the Code of Federal Regulations =

US code governing food and drugs

Title 21 is the portion of the Code of Federal Regulations that governs food and drugs within the United States for the Food and Drug Administration (FDA), the Drug Enforcement Administration (DEA), and the Office of National Drug Control Policy (ONDCP).

It is divided into three chapters:

- Chapter I — Food and Drug Administration
- Chapter II — Drug Enforcement Administration
- Chapter III — Office of National Drug Control Policy

== Chapter I ==
Most of the Chapter I regulations are based on the Federal Food, Drug, and Cosmetic Act.

Notable sections:

- 11 — electronic records and electronic signature related
- 50 Protection of human subjects in clinical trials
- 54 Financial disclosure by clinical investigators
- 56 Institutional review boards that oversee clinical trials
- 58 Good laboratory practices (GLP) for nonclinical studies

The 100 series are regulations pertaining to food:

- 101, especially 101.9 — Nutrition facts label related
  - (c)(2)(ii) — Requirement to include trans fat values
  - (c)(8)(iv) — Vitamin and mineral values
- 106-107 requirements for infant formula
- 110 et seq. cGMPs for food products
- 111 et seq. cGMPs for dietary supplements
- 170 food additives
- 190 dietary supplements

The 200 and 300 series are regulations pertaining to pharmaceuticals :

- 202-203 Drug advertising and marketing
- 210 et seq. cGMPs for pharmaceuticals
- 310 et seq. Requirements for new drugs
- 328 et seq. Specific requirements for over-the-counter (OTC) drugs.

The 500 series are regulations for animal feeds and animal medications:

- 510 et seq. New animal drugs
- 556 Tolerances for residues of drugs in food animals

The 600 series covers biological products (e.g. vaccines, blood):

- 601 Licensing under section 351 of the Public Health Service Act
- 606 et seq. cGMPs for human blood and blood products

The 700 series includes the limited regulations on cosmetics:

- 701 Labeling requirements

The 800 series are for medical devices:

- 803 Medical device reporting
- 814 Premarket approval of medical devices
- 820 et seq. Quality system regulations (analogous to cGMP, but structured like ISO)
- 860 et seq. Listing of specific approved devices and how they are classified

The 900 series covers mammography quality requirements enforced by CDRH.

The 1000 series covers radiation-emitting device (e.g. cell phones, lasers, x-ray generators); requirements enforced by the Center for Devices and Radiological Health. It also talks about the FDA citizen petition.

The 1100 series includes updated rules deeming items that statutorily come under the definition of "tobacco product" to be subject to the Federal Food, Drug, and Cosmetic Act as amended by the Tobacco Control Act. The items affected include E-cigarettes, Hookah tobacco, and pipe tobacco.

The 1200 series consists of rules primarily based in laws other than the Food, Drug, and Cosmetic Act:

- 1240 Rules promulgated under 361 of the Public Health Service Act on interstate control of communicable disease, such as:
  - Requirements for pasteurization of milk
  - Interstate shipment of turtles as pets.
  - Interstate shipment of African rodents that may carry monkeypox.
  - Sanitation on interstate conveyances (i.e. airplanes and ships)
- 1271 Requirements for human cells, tissues, and cellular and tissue-based products (i.e. the cGTPs).

== Chapter II ==
Notable sections:

- 1308 — Schedules of controlled substances
  - 1308.03(a) — Administrative Controlled Substances Code Number
  - 1308.11 — List of Schedule I drugs
  - 1308.12 — List of Schedule II drugs
  - 1308.13 — List of Schedule III drugs
  - 1308.14 — List of Schedule IV drugs
  - 1308.15 — List of Schedule V drugs

== See also ==
- Title 21 of the United States Code - Food and Drugs
- EudraLex (medicinal products in the European Union)
