= Phenoperidine =

Opioid analgesic drug

Clinical data
- Routes of administration: Intravenous
- ATC code: N01AH04 (WHO)

Legal status
- Legal status: AU: S8 (Controlled drug); BR: Class A1 (Narcotic drugs); CA: Schedule I; DE: Anlage I (Authorized scientific use only); US: Schedule I

Pharmacokinetic data
- Metabolism: Liver
- Excretion: Bile and Urine

Identifiers
- IUPAC name: ethyl 1-(3-hydroxy-3-phenylpropyl)-4-phenylpiperidine-4-carboxylate
- CAS Number: 562-26-5
- PubChem CID: 11226
- ChemSpider: 10752
- UNII: G9BH09J4JW
- KEGG: D02611
- CompTox Dashboard (EPA): DTXSID90862199
- ECHA InfoCard: 100.008.391

Chemical and physical data
- Formula: C_{23}H_{29}NO_{3}
- Molar mass: 367.489 g·mol^{−1}
- 3D model (JSmol): Interactive image
- SMILES: O=C(OCC)C1(CCN(CC1)CCC(O)c1ccccc1)c1ccccc1
- InChI: InChI=1S/C23H29NO3/c1-2-27-22(26)23(20-11-7-4-8-12-20)14-17-24(18-15-23)16-13-21(25)19-9-5-3-6-10-19/h3-12,21,25H,2,13-18H2,1H3; Key:IPOPQVVNCFQFRK-UHFFFAOYSA-N

Phenoperidine (Operidine or Lealgin), is an opioid analgesic which is structurally related to pethidine and is used clinically as a general anesthetic.

== Medical use ==
Phenoperidine is an opioid pain killer—a narcotic analgesic.

== Pharmacology ==
It is a derivative of isonipecotic acid, like pethidine, and is metabolized in part to norpethidine. Its potency range is due to method of ingestion. figure 20–80 times as potent as pethidine as an analgesic. The greatly increased potency essentially eliminates the toxic effects of norpethidine accumulation which are seen when pethidine is administered in high doses or for long periods of time.

== History and Synthesis ==
Phenoperidine was first synthesized in 1957 by Paul Janssen, of the company now known as Janssen Pharmaceutica, who was seeking better opioid pain-killers. His two prototype drugs were methadone and pethidine, each which had been invented in 1930s by Otto Eisleb, who worked for IG Farben. His initial work starting with methadone yielded dextromoramide in 1954. Janssen then turned to making pethidine analogues, due in part to the less complicated chemistry of the compound. During his explorations, he replaced the methyl group attached to the pethidine nitrogen with a phenylhydroxypropyl group, and this yielded phenoperidine, in 1957. Phenoperidine was determined to have decreased stability and enhanced lipophilicity compared to pethidine. Soon after, studies in mice showed that phenoperidine was over 100 times more potent than pethidine.

In 1958, the same line of work yielded "one of the greatest advances of the 20th century psychiatry", haloperidol, as well as diphenoxylate, which lacked the opioid's analgesic properties but still stopped peristalsis in the intestines, a typical side effect of opioids; Janssen brought diphenoxylate to market as a drug to treat diarrhea. And through further advances, Janssen created fentanyl in 1960, which proved to be ten times more potent than phenoperidine.

== Historical uses ==
In 1959, the combination of phenoperidine and haloperidol was first used in Europe in anesthesia to induce a detached, pain free state called neuroleptic analgesia; the use of that mixture boomed in early 1960s but was overtaken by the combination of fentanyl and droperidol, which was widely used through the 1980s. These combination approaches were not adopted in the US.

== Regulations ==
In 1961 phenoperidine was added to the 1931 Convention for Limiting the Manufacture and Regulating the Distribution of Narcotic Drugs by the World Health Organization via the Single Convention on Narcotic Drugs.

In the US it is classified as a Drug Enforcement Administration (DEA) Schedule I controlled substance opiate with a corresponding code 9641.
