= C25H32N2O2 =

The molecular formula C_{25}H_{32}N_{2}O_{2} (molar mass: 392.53 g/mol, exact mass: 392.2464 u) may refer to:

- Racemoramide (or simply moramide)
  - Dextromoramide
  - Levomoramide
