= OPPPP =

Chemical compound

Identifiers
- IUPAC name: [1-(3-oxo-3-phenylpropyl)-4-phenylpiperidin-4-yl] propanoate
- CAS Number: 802832-29-7 4472-57-5 (HCl)
- PubChem CID: 424788
- ChemSpider: 375886
- CompTox Dashboard (EPA): DTXSID301336704

Chemical and physical data
- Formula: C_{23}H_{27}NO_{3}
- Molar mass: 365.473 g·mol^{−1}
- 3D model (JSmol): Interactive image
- SMILES: CCC(=O)OC1(CCN(CC1)CCC(=O)C2=CC=CC=C2)C3=CC=CC=C3
- InChI: InChI=1S/C23H27NO3/c1-2-22(26)27-23(20-11-7-4-8-12-20)14-17-24(18-15-23)16-13-21(25)19-9-5-3-6-10-19/h3-12H,2,13-18H2,1H3; Key:GCFJWMMGLWBENW-UHFFFAOYSA-N

OPPPP (1-(3-Oxo-3-phenylpropyl)-4-phenyl-4-piperidinyl propionate, EA-2221) is one of several compounds derived from MPPP, the reversed ester of the opioid analgesic pethidine, which were sold as designer drugs in the 1980s, but have been rarely encountered by law enforcement since the passage of the Federal Analogue Act in 1986. In animal studies it was found to be around 1000× the potency of pethidine, making it several times the potency of fentanyl and with similar hazards of respiratory depression and overdose. It is closely related to numerous compounds made by Janssen et al. for which the structure-activity relationship is well established.

== See also ==
- List of fentanyl analogues
- PEPAP
- LY-88329
