= C22H27NO2 =

The molecular formula C_{22}H_{27}NO_{2} (molar mass: 373.91 g/mol, exact mass: 373.180857) may refer to:

- Amineptine
- Danazol, an anabolic steroid
- Lobeline
- Pheneridine
- 2α-(Propanoyl)-3β-(2-(6-methoxynaphthyl))-tropane
- Ro4-1539, an opioid analgesic
