= Oxpheneridine =

Chemical compound

Clinical data
- ATC code: none

Identifiers
- IUPAC name: ethyl 1-(2-hydroxy-2-phenylethyl)-4-phenylpiperidine-4-carboxylate
- CAS Number: 546-32-7
- PubChem CID: 56863
- ChemSpider: 51270
- UNII: 5OO7RKH9WL
- CompTox Dashboard (EPA): DTXSID80862163

Chemical and physical data
- Formula: C_{22}H_{27}NO_{3}
- Molar mass: 353.462 g·mol^{−1}
- 3D model (JSmol): Interactive image
- SMILES: O=C(OCC)C3(c1ccccc1)CCN(CC(O)c2ccccc2)CC3
- InChI: InChI=1S/C22H27NO3/c1-2-26-21(25)22(19-11-7-4-8-12-19)13-15-23(16-14-22)17-20(24)18-9-5-3-6-10-18/h3-12,20,24H,2,13-17H2,1H3; Key:DBDXZFAMJLGFGD-UHFFFAOYSA-N

Oxpheneridine is a 4-phenylpiperidine derivative that is related to the opioid analgesic drug pethidine (meperidine).

Oxpheneridine is not currently used in medicine. Presumably it has similar effects to other opioid derivatives, such as analgesia, sedation, nausea and respiratory depression.

Unlike most opioid derivatives, oxpheneridine is not specifically listed as an illegal drug. In the UNODC narcotics report of 1958, they state that it was not possible to administer oxpheneridine in high doses as it is poorly soluble and highly irritating, and at the low doses administered it did not produce addiction in animals. This appears to be the only time oxpheneridine has been investigated, and so its pharmacological properties have not been well established.

Oxpheneridine would probably be regarded as a controlled substance analogue of pethidine on the grounds of its related chemical structure in some jurisdictions such as the United States, Australia and New Zealand.

In Canada, Oxpheneridine is specifically excluded from the illegal drugs list on the Controlled Drugs and Substances Act schedules, presumably on the basis of the lack of addictive potential found by the UNODC.

== Synthesis ==
Alkylation of normeperidine [77-17-8] with styrene oxide completes the synthesis.

== See also ==
- Opioid
- Meperidine
- Pheneridine
- Fentanyl
- Carbamethidine
