= List of Schedule V controlled substances (U.S.) =

This is the list of Schedule V controlled substances in the United States as defined by the Controlled Substances Act. The following findings are required for substances to be placed in this schedule:

1. The drug or other substance has a low potential for abuse relative to the drugs or other substances in schedule IV.
2. The drug or other substance has a currently accepted medical use in treatment in the United States.
3. Abuse of the drug or other substance may lead to limited physical dependence or psychological dependence relative to the drugs or other substances in schedule IV.

The complete list of Schedule V substances is as follows. The Administrative Controlled Substances Code Number and Federal Register citation for each substance is included.

== Opiates and opioids ==
ACSCN	Drug
N/A	Not more than 200 milligrams of codeine per 100 milliliters or per 100 grams (Note: This substance was expressly scheduled by the Controlled Substances Act on October 27, 1970. The 1974 Federal Register ruling (by Administrator John R. Bartels, Jr.) merely organized its listing in the Code of Federal Regulations.)
N/A	Not more than 100 milligrams of dihydrocodeine per 100 milliliters or per 100 grams
N/A	Not more than 100 milligrams of ethylmorphine per 100 milliliters or per 100 grams
N/A	Not more than 2.5 milligrams of diphenoxylate and not less than 25 micrograms of atropine sulfate per dosage unit
N/A	Not more than 100 milligrams of opium per 100 milliliters or per 100 grams
N/A	Not more than 0.5 milligram of difenoxin and not less than 25 micrograms of atropine sulfate per dosage unit

== Stimulants ==
ACSCN	Drug
1485	Pyrovalerone

== Others ==
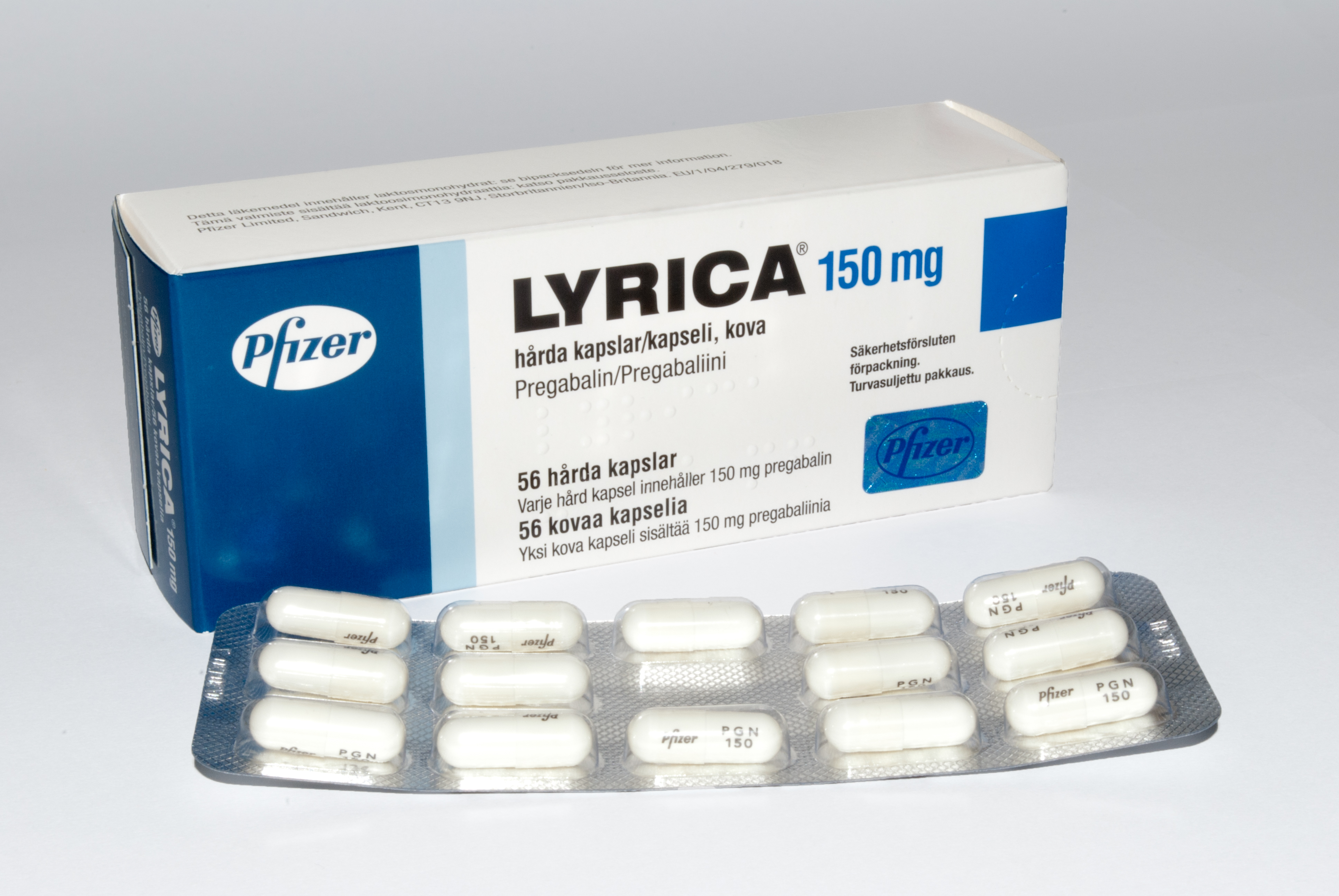
Box of 150 mg Lyrica (pregabalin) capsules from Finland

ACSCN	Drug
2710	Brivaracetam ((2S)-2-[(4R)-2-oxo-4-propylpyrrolidin-1-yl] butanamide))
2720	Cenobamate
2779	Ezogabine
2401	Ganaxolone
2746	Lacosamide
2790	Lasmiditan
2782	Pregabalin

== See also ==
- List of Schedule I controlled substances (U.S.)
- List of Schedule II controlled substances (U.S.)
- List of Schedule III controlled substances (U.S.)
- List of Schedule IV controlled substances (U.S.)
