= C11H15NOS =

The molecular formula C_{11}H_{15}NOS (molar mass: 209.31 g/mol) may refer to:

- SDMA (drug)
- Tilmetamine
