= Norpethidine =

Chemical compound

Clinical data
- ATC code: none

Legal status
- Legal status: AU: Unscheduled; BR: Class A1 (Narcotic drugs); CA: Schedule I; DE: Anlage II (Authorized trade only, not prescriptible); US: Schedule II; UN: Narcotic Schedule I

Identifiers
- IUPAC name: Ethyl 4-phenylpiperidine-4-carboxylate
- CAS Number: 77-17-8
- PubChem CID: 32414
- ChemSpider: 30039
- UNII: JG096PMW2N
- KEGG: C22685
- ChEMBL: ChEMBL1052
- CompTox Dashboard (EPA): DTXSID50227806
- ECHA InfoCard: 100.000.918

Chemical and physical data
- Formula: C_{14}H_{19}NO_{2}
- Molar mass: 233.311 g·mol^{−1}
- 3D model (JSmol): Interactive image
- SMILES: O=C(OCC)C2(c1ccccc1)CCNCC2
- InChI: InChI=1S/C14H19NO2/c1-2-17-13(16)14(8-10-15-11-9-14)12-6-4-3-5-7-12/h3-7,15H,2,8-11H2,1H3; Key:QKHMFBKXTNQCTM-UHFFFAOYSA-N

Norpethidine (normeperidine, pethidine intermediate B) is a 4-phenylpiperidine derivative that is both a precursor to, and the toxic metabolite of, pethidine (meperidine). It is scheduled by UN Single Convention on Narcotic Drugs. It is a Schedule II Narcotic controlled substance in the United States and has an ACSCN of 9233. The 2014 annual manufacturing quota was 11 grams (0.39 oz).

Norpethidine is a controlled drug because of its potential uses in manufacturing both pethidine itself and a range of N-substituted derivatives, but it has little opioid activity in its own right. Instead, norpethidine acts as a stimulant and causes convulsions.

Bioaccumulation of norpethidine is a major complication when pethidine is used in medicine as an analgesic, as when pethidine is used in high doses or administered by intravenous infusion, norpethidine can accumulate in the body at a faster rate than it is being excreted, particularly in elderly patients or those with compromised liver or kidney function, resulting in a range of toxic effects, mainly convulsions, but also myoclonus and hyponatremia. These complications can be serious and have sometimes resulted in death.

Metabolism of pethidine to norpethidine is carried out mainly by the CYP enzymes, CYP2B6, CYP2C19 and CYP3A4, in the liver, and since the activity of these enzymes can vary between individuals and can be influenced by concurrent use of other drugs, the rate and extent of norpethidine production can be difficult to predict.

== Precursor Use ==
Norpethidine can be used as a precursor in synthesis of other drugs, including etoxeridine, benzethidine, furethidine, morpheridine, anileridine, phenoperidine, piminodine, oxpheneridine, pheneridine & carperidine.

== See also ==
- Nortilidine
- O-Desmethyltramadol
- Moramide intermediate
- Methadone intermediate
- Pethidine intermediate A
- Pethidine intermediate C (pethidinic acid)
