= Visha Oosi case =

Visha Oosi Case (lit. meaning case of toxic injection) is a series of murders that took place between 1970 and 1972 in Chennai, India. The victims were mostly people carrying higher amount of cash and jewellery. The perpetrators would pose as customs officials and took the victims away in a car. In the car, they would inject them with large amounts of Pethidine to kill them, and they discarded the bodies along the Andhra Pradesh-Tamil Nadu border.
