= LY-88329 =

Chemical compound

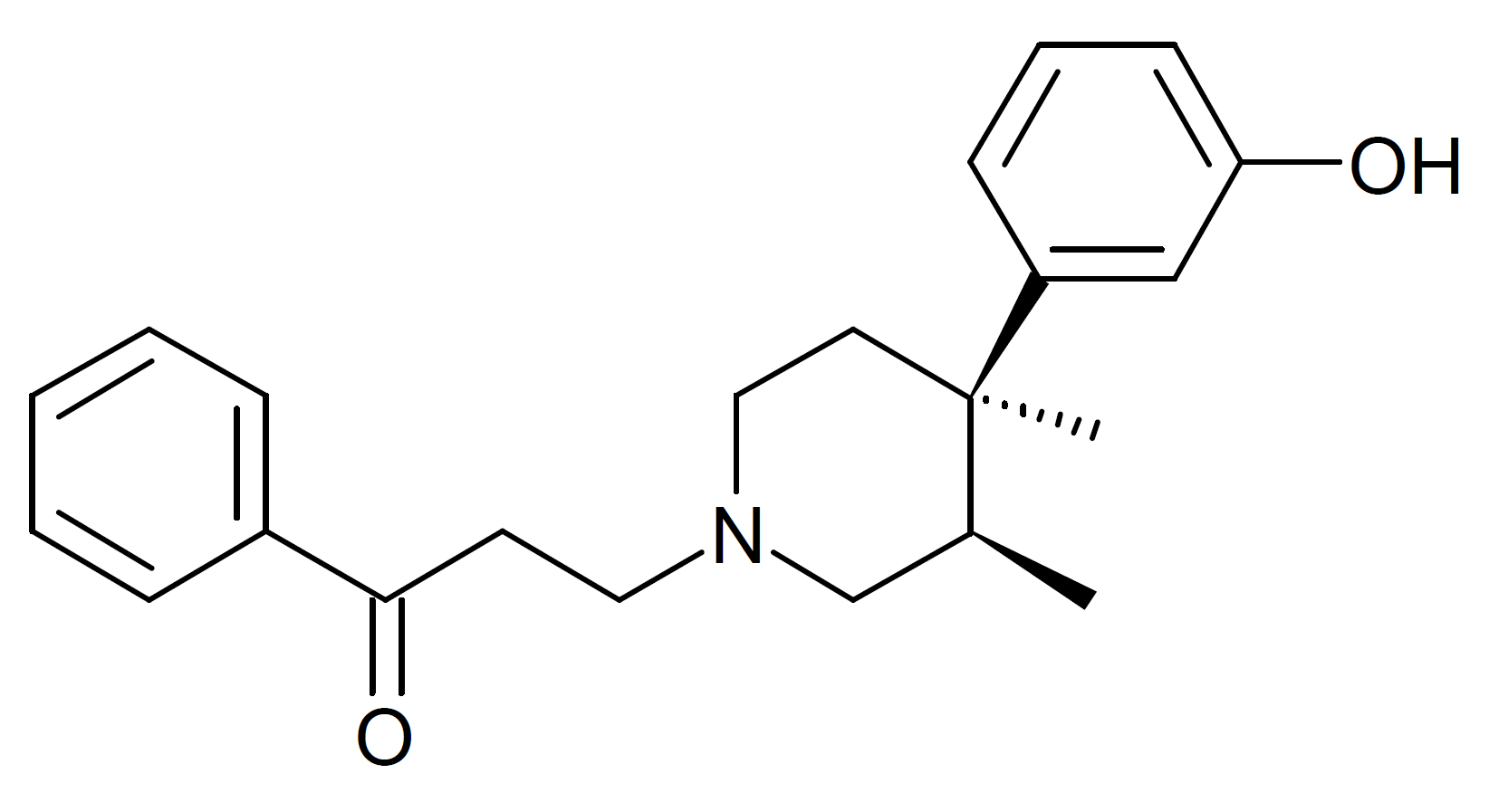

Identifiers
- IUPAC name: 3-[(3R,4R)-4-(3-hydroxyphenyl)-3,4-dimethylpiperidin-1-yl]-1-phenylpropan-1-one
- CAS Number: 78693-86-4
- PubChem CID: 10042707
- ChemSpider: 4953075
- ChEMBL: ChEMBL94345

Chemical and physical data
- Formula: C_{22}H_{27}NO_{2}
- Molar mass: 337.463 g·mol^{−1}
- 3D model (JSmol): Interactive image
- SMILES: C[C@H]1CN(CC[C@@]1(C)C2=CC(=CC=C2)O)CCC(=O)C3=CC=CC=C3
- InChI: InChI=1S/C22H27NO2/c1-17-16-23(13-11-21(25)18-7-4-3-5-8-18)14-12-22(17,2)19-9-6-10-20(24)15-19/h3-10,15,17,24H,11-14,16H2,1-2H3/t17-,22+/m0/s1; Key:IQGJBVSSFDCTAJ-HTAPYJJXSA-N

LY-88329 is an opioid receptor ligand related to medicines such as pethidine. It has high affinity to the μ-opioid receptor, but unlike structurally related drugs such as 3-methylfentanyl and OPPPP, LY-88329 is a potent opioid antagonist. In animal studies it blocks the effects of morphine and has anorectic action.

== See also ==
- Alvimopan
