= C22H27NO3 =

The molecular formula C_{22}H_{27}NO_{3} (molar mass: 353.45 g/mol, exact mass: 353.1991 u) may refer to:

- Dioxaphetyl butyrate
- Oxpheneridine
