= List of Schedule IV controlled substances (U.S.) =

This is the list of Schedule IV controlled substances in the United States as defined by the Controlled Substances Act. The following findings are required for substances to be placed in this schedule:

1. The drug or other substance has a low potential for abuse relative to the drugs or other substances in schedule III.
2. The drug or other substance has a currently (Note: The use of the term "currently" in Wikipedia is deprecated per MOS:RELTIME, however its presence here is a direct quotation of the referenced Act.) accepted medical use in treatment in the United States.
3. Abuse of the drug or other substance may lead to limited physical dependence or psychological dependence relative to the drugs or other substances in schedule III.

The complete list of Schedule IV substances is as follows. The Administrative Controlled Substances Code Number and Federal Register citation for each substance is included.

== Narcotics ==
ACSCN	Drug
9167	Not more than 1 milligram of difenoxin and not less than 25 micrograms of atropine sulfate per dosage unit.
9278	Dextropropoxyphene
9752	Tramadol

== Depressants ==
ACSCN	Drug
2731	Alfaxalone
2882	Alprazolam
2145	Barbital (Note: This substance was expressly scheduled by the Controlled Substances Act on October 27, 1970. The 1974 Federal Register ruling (by Administrator John R. Bartels, Jr.) merely organized its listing in the Code of Federal Regulations.)
2400	Brexanolone
2748	Bromazepam
2749	Camazepam
8192	Carisoprodol
2460	Chloral betaine
2465	Chloral hydrate
2744	Chlordiazepoxide
2751	Clobazam
2737	Clonazepam
2768	Clorazepate
2752	Clotiazepam
2753	Cloxazolam
2410	Daridorexant
2754	Delorazepam
2765	Diazepam
2467	Dichloraphenazone
2756	Estazolam
2540	Ethchlorvynol
2545	Ethinamate
2758	Ethyl loflazepate
2759	Fludiazepam
2763	Flunitrazepam^{†}
2767	Flurazepam
2138	Fospropofol
2762	Halazepam
2771	Haloxazolam
2772	Ketazolam
2245	Lemborexant
2773	Loprazolam
2885	Lorazepam
2774	Lormetazepam
2800	Mebutamate
2836	Medazepam
2820	Meprobamate
2264	Methohexital
2250	Methylphenobarbital (mephobarbital)
2884	Midazolam
2837	Nimetazepam
2834	Nitrazepam
2838	Nordiazepam
2835	Oxazepam
2839	Oxazolam
2585	Paraldehyde
2591	Petrichloral
2285	Phenobarbital
2883	Pinazepam
2764	Prazepam
2881	Quazepam
2846	Remimazolam
2223	Suvorexant
2925	Temazepam^{†}
2886	Tetrazepam
2887	Triazolam
2781	Zaleplon
2783	Zolpidem
2784	Zopiclone
2420	Zuranolone

^{†}Flunitrazepam has not been approved by the Food and Drug Administration for medical use, and is considered to be an illegal drug.

^{†}Temazepam may require a specially coded prescription in certain States.

== Lorcaserin ==
ACSCN	Drug
1625	Lorcaserin

== Stimulants ==
ACSCN	Drug
1230	Cathine
1610	Diethylpropion
1760	Fencamfamin
1575	Fenproporex
1605	Mazindol
1580	Mefenorex
1680	Modafinil and enantiopure armodafinil
1530	Pemoline
1640	Phentermine
1750	Pipradrol
1729	Serdexmethylphenidate
1675	Sibutramine
1650	Solriamfetol
1635	SPA / (-)-1-dimethylamino- 1,2-diphenylethane
1775	Oveporexton

== Others ==
ACSCN	Drug
9709	Pentazocine
9720	Butorphanol
9725	Eluxadoline

== See also ==
- List of Schedule I controlled substances (U.S.)
- List of Schedule II controlled substances (U.S.)
- List of Schedule III controlled substances (U.S.)
- List of Schedule V controlled substances (U.S.)
