= List of Schedule III controlled substances (U.S.) =

This is the list of Schedule III controlled substances in the United States as defined in section 202 of the Controlled Substances Act (21 U.S.C. § 812) and 21 CFR 1308.13. The following findings are required for substances to be placed in this schedule:

1. The drug or other substance has a potential for abuse less than the drugs or other substances in schedules I and II.
2. The drug or other substance has a currently (Note: The use of the term "currently" in Wikipedia is deprecated per MOS:RELTIME, however its presence here is a direct quotation of the referenced Act.) accepted medical use in treatment in the United States.
3. Abuse of the drug or other substance may lead to moderate or low physical dependence or high psychological dependence.

The complete list of Schedule III substances is as follows. The Administrative Controlled Substances Code Number and Federal Register citation for each substance is included.

== Stimulants ==
ACSCN	Drug
1405	See 21 CFR 1308.13(b)(1)
1228	Benzphetamine
1645	Chlorphentermine
1647	Clortermine
1615	Phendimetrazine
1641	Centanafadine

== Depressants ==
ACSCN	Drug
2100	Any derivative of barbituric acid (Note: This substance was expressly scheduled by the Controlled Substances Act on October 27, 1970. The 1974 Federal Register ruling (by Administrator John R. Bartels, Jr.) merely organized its listing in the Code of Federal Regulations.)
2510	Chlorhexadol
2020	Embutramide
2012	FDA-approved oxybate products
2261	Perampanel
7285	Ketamine
7300	Lysergic acid
7310	Lysergic acid amide
2575	Methyprylon
2600	Sulfondiethylmethane
2605	Sulfonethylmethane
2610	Sulfonmethane
7295	Tiletamine and zolazepam

== Others ==
ACSCN	Drug
9400	Nalorphine

== Narcotics ==
ACSCN	Drug
9803	Not more than 1.8 grams of codeine per 100 milliliters or not more than 90 milligrams per dosage unit, with an equal or greater quantity of an isoquinoline alkaloid of opium
9804	Not more than 1.8 grams of codeine per 100 milliliters or not more than 90 milligrams per dosage unit, with one or more active, nonnarcotic ingredients in recognized therapeutic amounts
9807	Not more than 1.8 grams of dihydrocodeine per 100 milliliters or not more than 90 milligrams per dosage unit, with one or more active nonnarcotic ingredients in recognized therapeutic amounts
9808	Not more than 300 milligrams of ethylmorphine per 100 milliliters or not more than 15 milligrams per dosage unit, with one or more active, nonnarcotic ingredients in recognized therapeutic amounts
9809	Not more than 500 milligrams of opium per 100 milliliters or per 100 grams or not more than 25 milligrams per dosage unit, with one or more active, nonnarcotic ingredients in recognized therapeutic amounts
9810	Not more than 50 milligrams of morphine per 100 milliliters or per 100 grams, with one or more active, nonnarcotic ingredients in recognized therapeutic amounts
9064	Buprenorphine

== Steroids ==
ACSCN	Drug
4000	Anabolic steroids

== Cannabinoid ==
ACSCN	Drug
7360	FDA-approved products containing marijuana and products regulated by a state medical marijuana license
7369	Dronabinol in sesame oil and encapsulated in a soft gelatin capsule

== See also ==
- List of Schedule I controlled substances (U.S.)
- List of Schedule II controlled substances (U.S.)
- List of Schedule IV controlled substances (U.S.)
- List of Schedule V controlled substances (U.S.)
