= Twilight sleep =

Amnesic and analgesic state induced by morphine and scopolamine

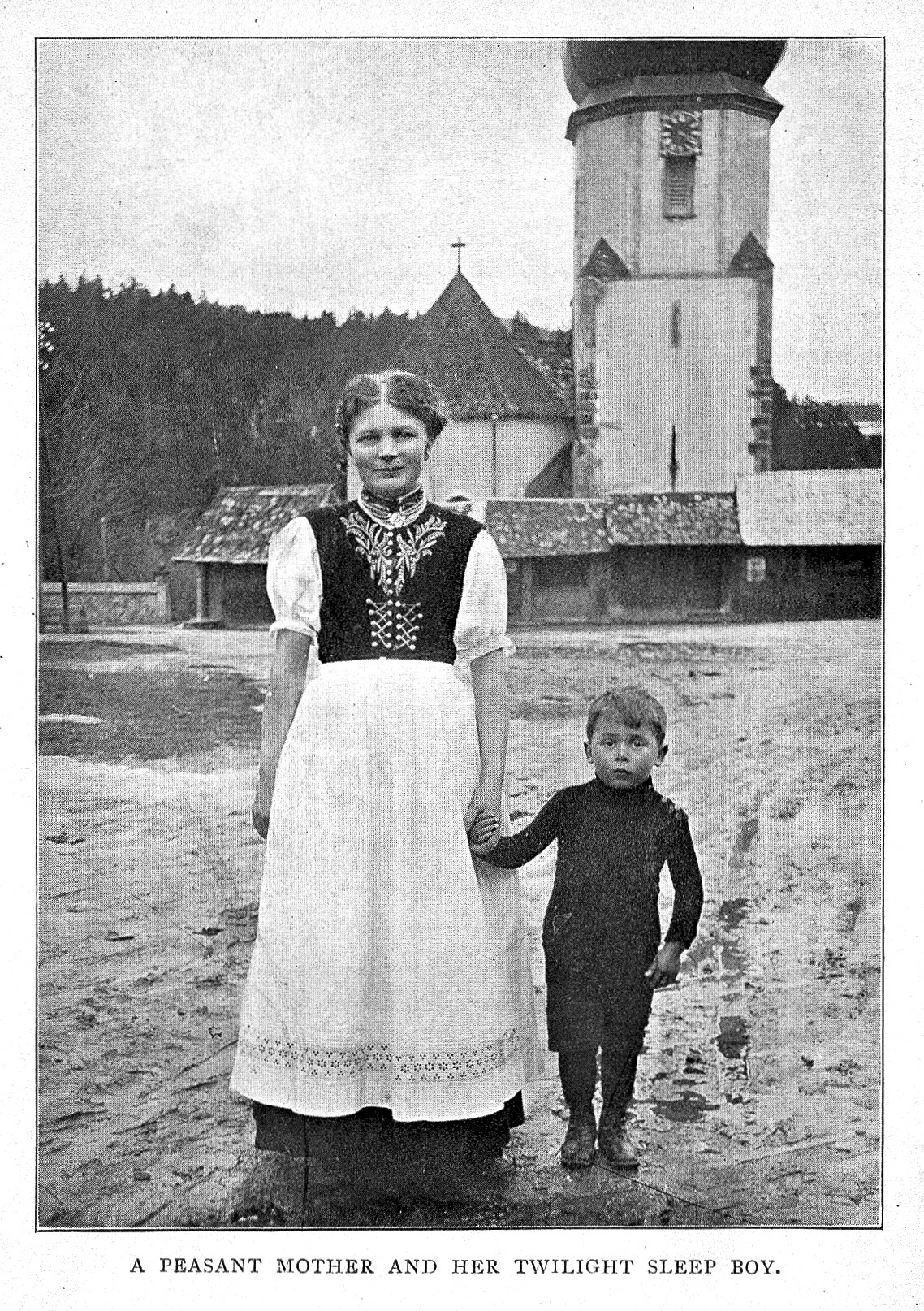
"A Peasant Mother and her Twilight Sleep Boy" from Painless childbirth in twilight sleep : a complete history of twilight sleep from its beginning in 1903 to its present development in 1915, including its successful use in Great Britain to-day by Hanna Rion

Twilight sleep (English translation of the German word Dämmerschlaf) is an amnesic state characterized by insensitivity to pain with or without the loss of consciousness, induced by an injection of morphine and scopolamine, with the purpose of pain management during childbirth. The obstetric method originated in Germany and gained large popularity in New York City in the early 20th century.

== Effects and usage ==
In the Freiburg technique, considered the gold standard of twilight birth, patients were first given an intramuscular injection of 1/150 grain (0.432 mg) of scopolamine and 1/2 grain (32.4 mg) of morphine. Forty five minutes later, a second scopolamine injection of the same dosage was administered. A memory test was then given, and subsequent smaller doses of scopolamine were given based on the individual's performance on the memory tests. When performed properly, the drug combination caused a drowsy state and relieved the pain only partially, whilst creating amnesia such that the woman giving birth sometimes would not remember any pain, although these results were variable. Because of how variable the scopolamine dosages are between patients, and the need for accurate assessment of performance on the memory test, the twilight sleep method required skillful, well-trained practitioners for proper execution.

To effectively keep women in an amnesic state, sensory isolation was necessary. Women gave birth in a darkened room, and the birth attendants wore uniforms designed to minimize noise. Women were sometimes blind-folded, had their ears plugged with oil-soaked cotton, or were tied to padded beds with leather straps to "promote sleep." Sensory deprivation also prevented delirium, one of the adverse side effects of scopolamine.

== History ==
=== Pain management in labor ===
Prior to the 20th century, childbirth predominantly happened in the home, without access to any medical interventions for pain management. Doctors (primarily, if not all men) were now managing the vast majority of childbirths as opposed to midwives or doulas. Many women were fearful of the process of giving birth, creating a large desire for pain management. But despite the demands of female patients, little relief was offered before the mid-19th century. Chemical anesthesia during labor was first introduced in 1847, receiving support from women and reluctance from physicians. The legacy of the Bible in the Anglo-American medical community was clear. While pain relief was seen as a necessary part of surgery, many physicians viewed painful childbirth as a natural, divinely ordained punishment for Eve’s behavior in the Garden of Eden. Anesthesia's use was popularized in 1853 by Queen Victoria’s decision to use chloroform for pain relief during the birth of her eighth child, Prince Leopold, Duke of Albany.

=== Germany ===
In 1899, a Dr Schneiderlin recommended the use of hyoscine and morphine for surgical anesthesia, and it began to be used as such sporadically. The use of this combination to ease birth was first proposed by Austrian physician Richard von Steinbuchel in 1902, before being picked up and further developed by Carl Gauss and Bernhardt Kronig in Freiburg, Germany, beginning in 1903. The method came to be known as "Dämmerschlaf" ("twilight sleep") or the "Freiburg method" when performed according to Gauss and Kronig's specific technique. Gauss and Kronig's research showed that the use of scopolamine during childbirth resulted in fewer complications and a faster recovery. The two presented their findings on the use of scopolamine during childbirth at the 1906 National Obstetrics Conference in Berlin, Germany. They recorded preferred dosages and adverse side effects of scopolamine, which included slowed pulse, bradypnea, delirium, dilated pupils, flushed skin, and thirst.

Its usage spread slowly, and different clinics experimented with different dosages and ingredients. By 1907, Gauss was performing the Freiburg method on all of his pregnant patients, and wealthy German women began to travel to Freiburg for childbirth to receive Kronig and Gauss's twilight sleep method. The Women's Clinic of the State University of Baden, where Gauss was a physician, had the city's lowest rates of maternal and neonatal mortality, further increasing the procedure's popularity. Eventually, wealthy pregnant women from the United States began traveling to Germany to receive twilight sleep during childbirth.

=== Popularity in New York City ===
A June 1914 McClure's Magazine article titled, "Painless Childbirth" published by Marguerite Tracy and Constance Leupp about twilight sleep was instrumental in increasing awareness of the procedure in the United States. The article garnered a massive public response, prompting thousands of women to write the magazine asking for information about doctors able to perform the method. In the year after the publication of the McClure article, several books such as Motherhood without Pain were published that universally praised the procedure. Newspapers and magazines began pressuring American obstetricians to adopt the method of pain management in their own clinics. Twilight sleep gained a "faddish" popularity in New York City from 1914 to 1916.

In 1915, the New York Times published an article on twilight sleep and the work of Hanna Rion Ver Beck, who had recently written a book entitled The Truth About Twilight Sleep. In that article, Beck said that the consensus of 69 medical reports she had looked at said that "scopolamin-morphin is without danger to the child".

Despite its popularity among patients, twilight sleep faced serious resistance from American doctors. Many physicians accused Gauss and Kronig of propagandizing women for financial gain. Because the treatment's greatest popularity overlapped with World War I, women who advocated for the German technique were also accused of being disloyal to the United States.

=== Decline ===
The use of twilight sleep began to decline in the United States after 1916 due to a number of factors. In the setting of New York City, it was extremely difficult to perform properly according to the Freiburg method. The dosages of morphine and scopolamine needed to be precise to avoid overdose, and NYC hospitals typically lacked the private, quiet birthing rooms like those used in Freiburg for sensory isolation. At its peak, there was such demand from women for twilight sleep that many physicians who were not adequately trained in the technique felt that the success of their obstetric practices depended on offering it. Thus, many untrained nurses and physicians were administering morphine and scopolamine at improper dosages, leading to a high rate of errors. Also contributing was that twilight sleep did not actually cause a painless childbirth—the scopolamine produced amnesia, so the user did not remember the pain.

== Relationship with first-wave feminism ==
Twilight sleep spread in popularity in New York through a grassroots female-led campaign that was closely connected to the first-wave feminism movement. Many of those active in the campaign were also suffragists, and they used techniques learned in the suffrage movement to increase awareness of twilight sleep.

The procedure was initially heralded as the dawning of "a new era for woman and through her for the whole human race." Advocates of twilight birth, including Hanna Rion, saw the fight for pain management in childbirth as strongly connected to the fight for gender equality. They described childbirth as "unnatural" and "unnecessary" and believed that male physicians did not adequately recognize the difficulties of maternity. Twilight sleep was seen as liberating women from the danger and pain imposed on them by their own bodies.

Early feminists in Manhattan formed the National Twilight Sleep Association in 1914, which advocated for wider use. They organized pro-twilight sleep materials, lectures, and encouraged local New York physicians to offer the practice; articles appeared in the New York Times, The Ladies' Home Journal, and Reader's Digest praising twilight birth. A moving picture showing the procedure, one of the first medical movies, was also created and screened for interested women. Prominent NTSA member Mary Boyd's lectures about twilight sleep would draw crowds of nearly 300 women. She would end her lectures with the campaign's popular saying: “You women… will have to fight for it, for the mass of doctors are opposed to it.” Boyd and Tracy saw twilight sleep as a turning point in medicine, describing it as the “first time… that the whole body of patients have risen to dictate to the doctors.”

The campaign dwindled after one of its leaders, Frances X. Carmody, died of hemorrhage giving birth while using twilight sleep, though her husband and doctor asserted that her death was unrelated to the use of twilight sleep.

== Long-term impacts on obstetrics ==
While twilight sleep began to wane in popularity after 1915, it permanently altered obstetric care and created irrevocable changes in the role of obstetricians in the United States. Obstetricians could no longer have a financially viable practice that did not include pain management during childbirth. The use of morphine and scopolamine in twilight birth also positioned drug intervention as the main measure used in pain management during labor. Because twilight birth was performed in a hospital setting, it greatly contributed to changing childbirth from a home event to a medicalized hospital procedure. The twilight birth fad accelerated the decrease in perceived importance of midwives and presented male physicians as those best qualified to assist in delivery, giving doctors more control over the birthing process. The twilight birth movement also illustrates the power of public demand and media coverage in shaping the popularity of certain obstetric techniques.

== See also ==
- A.C.E. mixture
- Anesthesia
- First-wave feminism
- Neuroleptanalgesic
