= Carperidine =

Chemical compound

Identifiers
- IUPAC name: ethyl 1-(3-amino-3-oxopropyl)-4-phenylpiperidine-4-carboxylate
- CAS Number: 7528-13-4
- PubChem CID: 24149
- ChemSpider: 22571
- UNII: LZ6E4G9827
- ChEMBL: ChEMBL2104584
- CompTox Dashboard (EPA): DTXSID10226254

Chemical and physical data
- Formula: C_{17}H_{24}N_{2}O_{3}
- Molar mass: 304.390 g·mol^{−1}
- 3D model (JSmol): Interactive image
- SMILES: CCOC(=O)C1(CCN(CC1)CCC(=O)N)C2=CC=CC=C2
- InChI: InChI=1S/C17H24N2O3/c1-2-22-16(21)17(14-6-4-3-5-7-14)9-12-19(13-10-17)11-8-15(18)20/h3-7H,2,8-13H2,1H3,(H2,18,20); Key:IXZCNCWEDOHVLK-UHFFFAOYSA-N

Carperidine (carbamethidine) is an opioid analgesic drug related to meperidine. It has analgesic and antitussive effects with similar potency to codeine, though several related compounds are significantly more potent.

== See also ==
- Etoxeridine
- Furethidine
- Piminodine
