= Embutramide =

Potent opioid used in euthanasia

Clinical data
- Trade names: Embutane
- AHFS/Drugs.com: International Drug Names
- Routes of administration: intravenous
- ATC code: none

Legal status
- Legal status: US: Schedule III

Identifiers
- IUPAC name: N-[2-ethyl-2-(3-methoxyphenyl)butyl]-4-hydroxybutanamide
- CAS Number: 15687-14-6
- PubChem CID: 27453
- DrugBank: DB01487
- ChemSpider: 25547
- UNII: 3P4TQG94T1
- KEGG: D03984
- CompTox Dashboard (EPA): DTXSID7057654
- ECHA InfoCard: 100.036.149

Chemical and physical data
- Formula: C_{17}H_{27}NO_{3}
- Molar mass: 293.407 g·mol^{−1}
- 3D model (JSmol): Interactive image
- SMILES: O=C(NCC(c1cc(OC)ccc1)(CC)CC)CCCO
- InChI: InChI=1S/C17H27NO3/c1-4-17(5-2,13-18-16(20)10-7-11-19)14-8-6-9-15(12-14)21-3/h6,8-9,12,19H,4-5,7,10-11,13H2,1-3H3,(H,18,20); Key:LMBMDLOSPKIWAP-UHFFFAOYSA-N

Embutramide (INN, USAN, BAN; brand name Embutane) is a potent sedative drug that is structurally related to GHB. It was developed by Hoechst A.G. in 1958 and was investigated as a general anesthetic agent, but was found to have a very narrow therapeutic window, with a 50 mg/kg dose producing effective sedation and a 75 mg/kg dose being fatal. Along with strong sedative effects, embutramide also produces respiratory depression and ventricular arrhythmia. Because of these properties, it was never adopted for medical use as an anesthetic as it was considered too dangerous for this purpose. Instead it is used for euthanasia in veterinary medicine, mainly for the euthanization of dogs. It is marketed under the name T61.

Embutramide is formulated as a combination product under the brand name Tributame, which also contains chloroquine and lidocaine.

Embutramide is used for euthanasia of a range of different animals, mainly small animals kept as pets rather than large farm animals. It may cause significant pain to the animal being euthanized, and so may be less humane than older drugs used for this purpose such as pentobarbital; however, it may have less abuse potential than barbiturates especially in the Tributame combination formulation, and so is less likely to be diverted for recreational abuse. Embutramide has however been reported to be used for suicide by people with access to the drug, and was added to the list of Schedule III drugs in the US in 2006, as a Non-Narcotic with ACSCN 2020, which classifies it with depressants such as benzodiazepines, barbiturates, and other sedative-hypnotics.

== Chemistry ==
Embutramide is considered an analog of gamma-hydroxybutyrate (GHB) due to its structural similarity to this naturally occurring neurotransmitter. GHB is known for its medical applications, such as treating narcolepsy and alcohol withdrawal symptoms. However, its recreational use has led to its classification as a controlled substance in many countries. The analog status of embutramide is significant in terms of its regulation and controlled use to prevent any potential misuse or abuse.

== Synthesis ==
Patents: Synthesis:

Alkylation of (3-methoxyphenyl)acetonitrile (1) with bromoethane gives 2-ethyl-2-(3-methoxyphenyl)butanenitrile (2). Sodium borohydride is used to reduce the nitrile group to give 2-ethyl-2-(3-methoxyphenyl)butan-1-amine (3). Amide formation via reaction with gamma-butyrolactone (GBL) completes the synthesis of embutramide (4).
