= Administrative Controlled Substances Code Number =

ID number for scheduled drugs

Administrative Controlled Substances Code Number (ACSCN) is a number assigned to drugs listed on the schedules created by the US Controlled Substances Act (CSA). The ACSCN is defined in 21 CFR § 1308.03(a).

Each chemical/drug on one of the schedules is assigned an ACSCN (for example, heroin is assigned 9200). The code number is used on various documents used in administration of the system mandated by the CSA.

ACSCN tables include the CSA schedule, common alternative chemical and trade names, and the free base conversion ratio (the molecular mass of the substance in question divided by the molecular mass of the free base). This is used to make meaningful qualitative comparisons between substances, and labeling of the end product may, as is required in many European countries, list the active substance using both (e.g. "each tablet contains 120 mg dihydrocodeine bitartrate, representing 80 mg dihydrocodeine base"). This method of citation is in theory compulsory worldwide for substances in Schedule I of the Single Convention on Narcotic Drugs 1961, a classification corresponding to opioids in US Schedule II with Narcotic classification plus cocaine (which inherited a narcotic designation from the 1931 Convention for Limiting the Manufacture and Regulating the Distribution of Narcotic Drugs and preceding treaties and national laws including the 1914 Harrison Narcotics Tax Act) and German Betäubungsmittelgesetz (BtMG) Schedule I and so on. This is also the case for Single Convention Schedule IV, which roughly corresponds to the United States' CSA Schedule I. and CSU Schedule

== List of schedules ==
For a complete list, see the list of schedules:

- List of Schedule I drugs (US)
- List of Schedule II drugs (US)
- List of Schedule III drugs (US)
- List of Schedule IV drugs (US)
- List of Schedule V drugs (US)
