= Neuroleptanalgesic =

Combination of an antipsychotic & a potent opioid analgesic

The word neuroleptic originates from the Greek word lepsis ("seizure"). Antipsychotics (a.k.a. neuroleptics or tranquilizers) were investigated by the anesthesiologists De Castro and Mundeleer who coined the term neuroleptanalgesia, an anesthetic process that involves combining a major antipsychotic/neuroleptic or tranquilizer with a potent opioid analgesic to produce a detached, pain-free state. This technique was widely used from the 1960s onwards, initially using a combination of phenoperidine and haloperidol, which was subsequently replaced in the early 1980s by a combination of fentanyl and droperidol. Efforts were also made to develop compounds which combined both types of activity in a single molecule. Neuroleptanalgesia results in amnesia among some patients, but not all. The technique has become less popular with the advent of more modern procedural sedation drug combinations, though it is still rarely used today as a combination of 2.5 mg droperidol and 50 μg (micrograms) of fentanyl in a ratio of 50:1. This combination is characterized by immobility, analgesia, and variable amnesia.

== See also ==
- Anesthetics
- Sedation
- Twilight sleep
