= Tiletamine =

Chemical compound

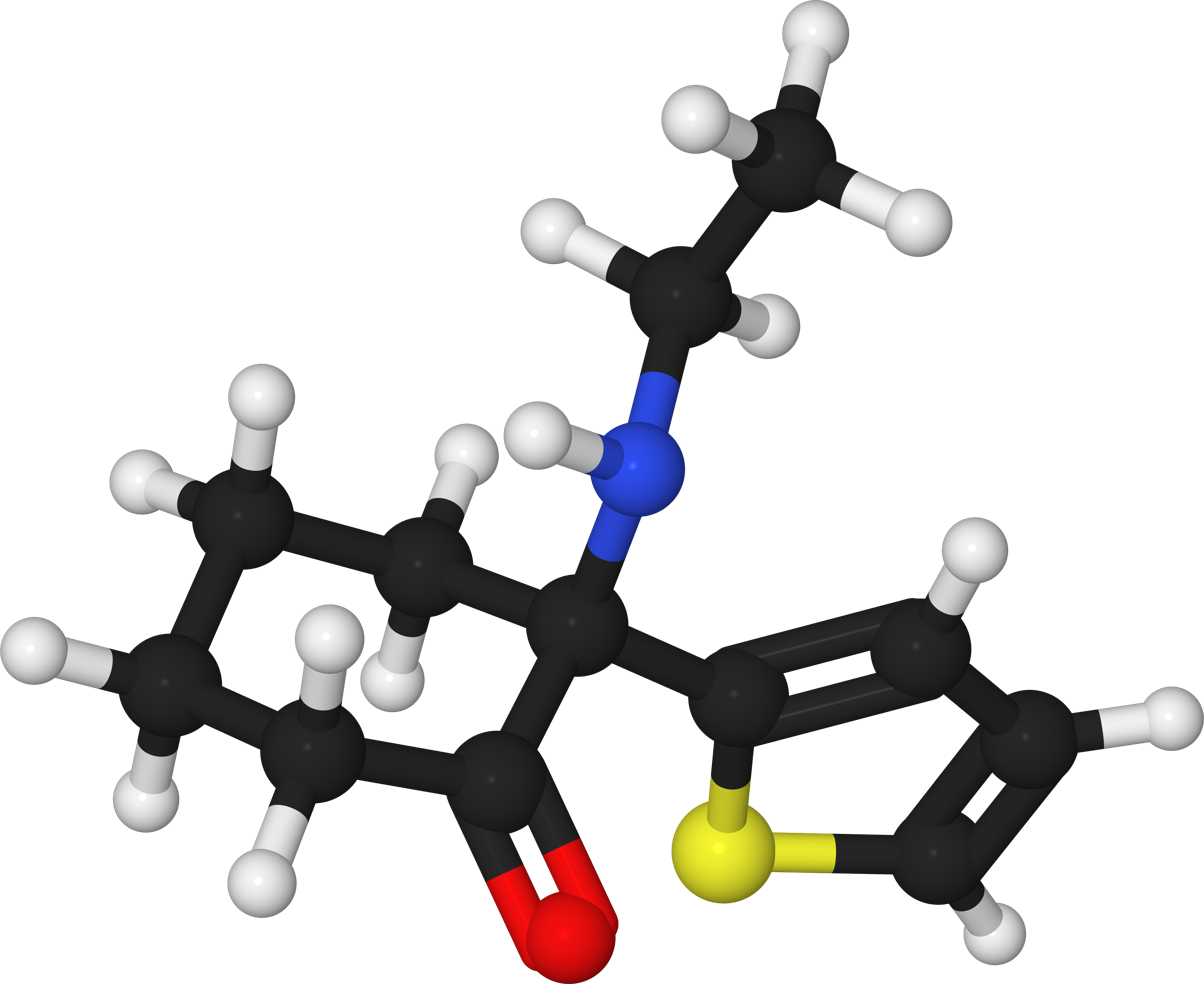

Clinical data
- AHFS/Drugs.com: International Drug Names
- Routes of administration: IV, IM, SC, Other
- ATC code: none

Legal status
- Legal status: AU: S4 (Prescription only); US: Schedule III (when combined with Zolazepam)

Pharmacokinetic data
- Metabolism: Liver
- Excretion: Kidneys

Identifiers
- IUPAC name: 2-Ethylamino-2-(2-thienyl)cyclohexanone
- CAS Number: 14176-49-9; HCl: 14176-50-2
- PubChem CID: 26533
- ChemSpider: 24714
- UNII: 2YFC543249; HCl: 99TAQ2QWJI
- KEGG: D08596
- CompTox Dashboard (EPA): DTXSID5048552
- ECHA InfoCard: 100.034.559

Chemical and physical data
- Formula: C_{12}H_{17}NOS
- Molar mass: 223.33 g·mol^{−1}
- 3D model (JSmol): Interactive image
- SMILES: O=C2C(c1sccc1)(NCC)CCCC2
- InChI: InChI=1S/C12H17NOS/c1-2-13-12(11-7-5-9-15-11)8-4-3-6-10(12)14/h5,7,9,13H,2-4,6,8H2,1H3; Key:QAXBVGVYDCAVLV-UHFFFAOYSA-N

Tiletamine is a dissociative anesthetic and pharmacologically classified as an NMDA receptor antagonist. It is an arylcyclohexylamine chemically related to ketamine.

It is used in veterinary medicine in the combination product Telazol (tiletamine/zolazepam, 50 mg/ml of each in 5 ml vial) as an injectable anesthetic for use in cats and dogs. It is sometimes used in combination with xylazine (Rompun) to chemically immobilize large mammals such as polar bears and wood bison. Telazol is the only commercially available tiletamine product in the United States. It is contraindicated in patients of an ASA score of III or greater and in animals with CNS signs, hyperthyroidism, cardiac disease, pancreatic or renal disease, pregnancy, glaucoma, or penetrating eye injuries.

== Use ==
Tiletamine is typically used in combination with the benzodiazepine zolazepam, as it often causes adverse reactions such as discomfort, muscle rigidity, and tremors when used alone. In combination with zolazepam, tiletamine provides ~30 minutes of anaesthesia with a wide safety profile. In cats, zolazepam has a longer effect than tiletamine, whilst the inverse is true in dogs. This leads to cats having a smoother recovery from the drug combination than dogs, in general.

== Pharmacology ==
Tiletamine acts as an NMDA receptor antagonist at the PCP_{1} site, blocking the flow of ions. It acts at this site with a K_{i} of 55-83 nM, suggesting that it is 6-8x more potent than ketamine there. Compared to other NMDA receptor antagonists such as dizocilpine, PCP, and ketamine, tiletamine does not significantly impact the release or metabolism of dopamine.

== Society and culture ==
Recreational use of telazol has been documented. Animal studies have also shown that tiletamine produces rewarding and reinforcing effects. Products that combine Tiletamine and Zolazepam are classified as Schedule III controlled substances in the United States. tiletamine is unscheduled in the US.

The use of pure tiletamine outside of the veterinary mixes has been documented being smoked in e-cigarettes, with both abuse and withdrawal causing severe limb tremors.

== See also ==
- Arylcyclohexylamine
- Tilmetamine
