= Racemoramide =

Opioid analgesic racemic drug mixture

Clinical data
- ATC code: none

Legal status
- Legal status: BR: Class A1 (Narcotic drugs); CA: Schedule I; DE: Anlage II (Authorized trade only, not prescriptible); US: Schedule I

Identifiers
- IUPAC name: 3-methyl-4-morpholin-4-yl-2,2-diphenyl-1-pyrrolidin-1-yl-butan-1-one
- CAS Number: 545-59-5
- PubChem CID: 9648
- ChemSpider: 9269
- UNII: L3J8QT828G
- CompTox Dashboard (EPA): DTXSID50859343
- ECHA InfoCard: 100.008.085

Chemical and physical data
- Formula: C_{25}H_{32}N_{2}O_{2}
- Molar mass: 392.543 g·mol^{−1}
- 3D model (JSmol): Interactive image
- SMILES: O=C(N1CCCC1)C(c2ccccc2)(c3ccccc3)C(C)CN4CCOCC4
- InChI: InChI=1S/C25H32N2O2/c1-21(20-26-16-18-29-19-17-26)25(22-10-4-2-5-11-22,23-12-6-3-7-13-23)24(28)27-14-8-9-15-27/h2-7,10-13,21H,8-9,14-20H2,1H3; Key:INUNXTSAACVKJS-UHFFFAOYSA-N

Racemoramide (INN, BAN), or simply moramide, is an opioid analgesic and a racemic mixture of the substances dextromoramide (the active component) and levomoramide (which is inactive), two enantiomers of a chiral molecule.

Racemoramide is itself controlled; in the United States it is under Schedule I as a Narcotic with an ACSCN of 9645 and a zero annual aggregate manufacturing quota as of 2014. Its salts are the bitartrate (free base conversion ratio 0.723) and dihydrochloride (0.843)

Moramide intermediate is listed separately as a Schedule II Narcotic controlled substance (ACSCN 9802), also with a zero quota.
