= Zolazepam =

Chemical compound

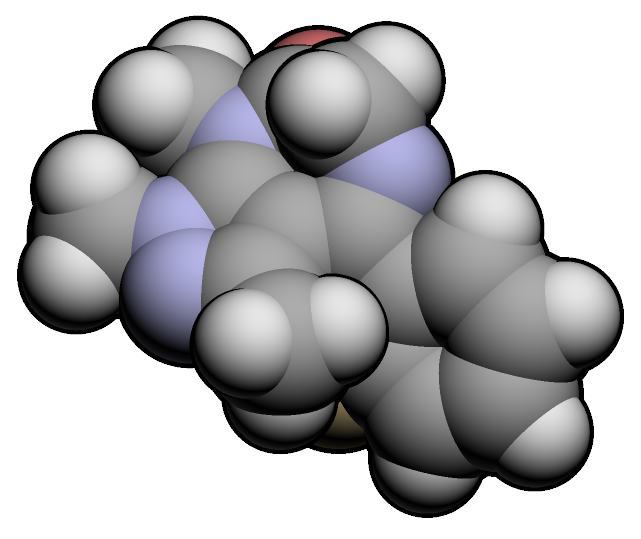

Clinical data
- Trade names: Telazol (in combination with tiletamine)
- AHFS/Drugs.com: International Drug Names
- ATC code: none

Legal status
- Legal status: AU: S4 (Prescription only); US: Schedule III (When in combination with Tiletamine)

Identifiers
- IUPAC name: 4-(2-fluorophenyl)-1,3,8-trimethyl-6H-pyrazolo[3,4-e][1,4]diazepin-7-one
- CAS Number: 31352-82-6
- PubChem CID: 35775
- ChemSpider: 32907
- UNII: G1R474U58U
- CompTox Dashboard (EPA): DTXSID30185278
- ECHA InfoCard: 100.118.306

Chemical and physical data
- Formula: C_{15}H_{15}FN_{4}O
- Molar mass: 286.310 g·mol^{−1}
- 3D model (JSmol): Interactive image
- SMILES: FC1=CC=CC=C1C2=NCC(N(C)C3=C2C(C)=NN3C)=O
- InChI: InChI=1S/C15H15FN4O/c1-9-13-14(10-6-4-5-7-11(10)16)17-8-12(21)19(2)15(13)20(3)18-9/h4-7H,8H2,1-3H3; Key:GDSCFOSHSOWNDL-UHFFFAOYSA-N

Zolazepam (Flupyrazapon) is a pyrazolodiazepinone derivative structurally related to the benzodiazepine drugs, which is used as an anaesthetic for a wide range of animals in veterinary medicine. Zolazepam is usually administered in combination with other drugs such as the NMDA antagonist tiletamine or the α2 adrenergic receptor agonist xylazine, depending on what purpose it is being used for. It has 5-10 times the potency of diazepam.

Zolazepam was developed by Horace A. de Wald and Donald E. Butler for Parke-Davis and was the result of a very detailed analysis of the benzodiazepine structure (U.S. patent 3,558,605 filed in 1969).

Zolazepam, in combination with tiletamine, has been used in the tranquilization of wild animals, such as gorillas and polar bears, and has been found to be superior to ketamine because of reduced side-effects. A 1:1 mixture of zolazepam and tiletamine is sold under the names Telazol and Zoletil.
