= PEPAP =

Opioid analgesic drug

Clinical data
- Other names: PEPAP

Legal status
- Legal status: AU: S9 (Prohibited substance); BR: Class F1 (Prohibited narcotics); DE: Anlage I (Authorized scientific use only); UK: Class A; US: Schedule I

Identifiers
- IUPAC name: 4-Phenyl-1-(2-phenylethyl)piperidin-4-yl acetate
- CAS Number: 64-52-8
- PubChem CID: 60977
- DrugBank: DB01562
- ChemSpider: 54939
- UNII: T6LN72I828
- KEGG: C22763
- CompTox Dashboard (EPA): DTXSID5048922

Chemical and physical data
- Formula: C_{21}H_{25}NO_{2}
- Molar mass: 323.436 g·mol^{−1}
- 3D model (JSmol): Interactive image
- SMILES: O=C(C)OC1(CCN(CC1)CCC2=CC=CC=C2)C3=CC=CC=C3
- InChI: InChI=1S/C21H25NO2/c1-18(23)24-21(20-10-6-3-7-11-20)13-16-22(17-14-21)15-12-19-8-4-2-5-9-19/h2-11H,12-17H2,1H3; Key:BVURVTVDNWSNFN-UHFFFAOYSA-N

PEPAP (phenethylphenylacetoxypiperidine) is an opioid analgesic that is an analog of desmethylprodine.

It is related to the drug MPPP, with an N-phenethyl group in place of the N-methyl substitution and an acetate ester rather than propionate. PEPAP is approximately 6–7 times more potent than morphine in laboratory rats. PEPAP presumably has similar effects to other opioids, producing analgesia, sedation and euphoria. Side effects can include itching, nausea and potentially serious respiratory depression which can be life-threatening.

PEPAP has been found to be a potent CYP2D6 inhibitor, which makes it likely to cause adverse interactions with some other drugs, although the inhibitory potency of PEPAP is less than that of MPPP. Both cocaine and methadone are also CYP2D6 inhibitors and could, in theory, potentiate the effect.

It is unlikely that the tetrahydropyridine byproducts that may be formed during the synthesis of PEPAP are neurotoxic in the same way as the MPPP byproduct MPTP. It appears that the N-methyl group of MPTP is required for neurotoxic activity. In animal experiments, only MPTP analogues that preserved the N-methyl-4-phenyl-1,2,3,6-tetrahydropyridine structure were active as dopaminergic neurotoxins. Most structural changes, including replacing the N-methyl group with other substituents, abolished neurotoxicity.

There is evidence that the clandestine manufacturers who produced MPPP in the 1970s, including the tainted batch, went on to produce PEPAP in an attempt to avoid using watched precursors or drug intermediates that were illegal.

== See also ==
- OPPPP
- LS-115509
- Fentanyl
- Pheneridine
- Desmethylprodine
