= Desmethylprodine =

Opioid analgesic drug

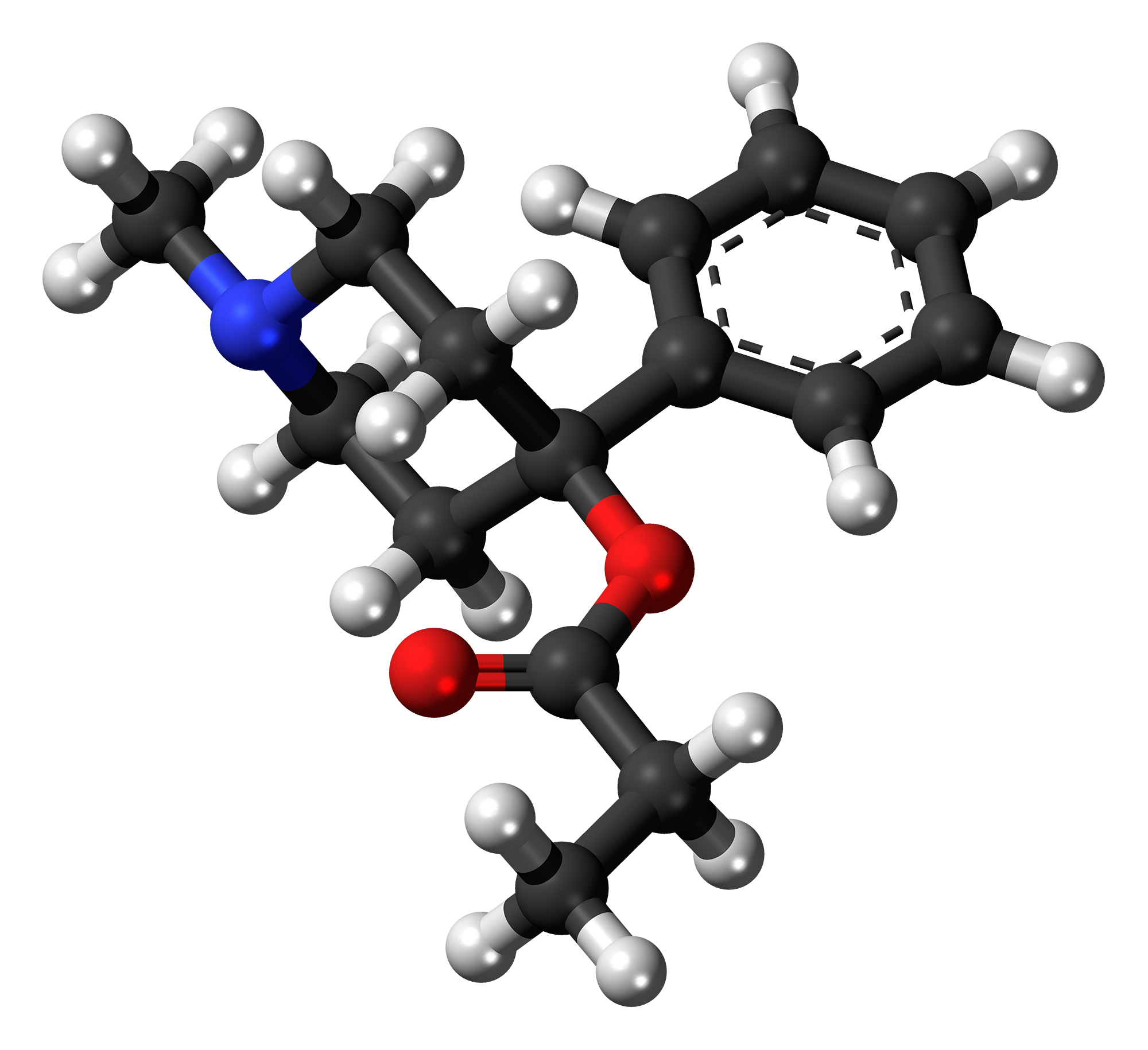

Clinical data
- Other names: 4-propionyloxy-4-phenyl-N-methylpiperidine, MPPP, 3-desmethylprodine

Legal status
- Legal status: BR: Class F1 (Prohibited narcotics); DE: Anlage I (Authorized scientific use only); US: Schedule I

Identifiers
- IUPAC name: (1-Methyl-4-phenylpiperidin-4-yl) propanoate
- CAS Number: 13147-09-6
- PubChem CID: 61583
- DrugBank: DB01478
- ChemSpider: 55493
- UNII: 07SGC963IR
- KEGG: C22797
- ChEMBL: ChEMBL279865
- CompTox Dashboard (EPA): DTXSID80157061

Chemical and physical data
- Formula: C_{15}H_{21}NO_{2}
- Molar mass: 247.338 g·mol^{−1}
- 3D model (JSmol): Interactive image
- SMILES: O=C(CC)OC1(CCN(CC1)C)C2=CC=CC=C2
- InChI: InChI=1S/C15H21NO2/c1-3-14(17)18-15(9-11-16(2)12-10-15)13-7-5-4-6-8-13/h4-8H,3,9-12H2,1-2H3; Key:BCQMRZRAWHNSBF-UHFFFAOYSA-N

Desmethylprodine or 1-methyl-4-phenyl-4-propionoxypiperidine (MPPP, Ro 2-0718) is an opioid analgesic drug developed in the 1940s by researchers at Hoffmann-La Roche. It is labeled by the DEA as a Schedule I drug in the United States. It is an analog of pethidine (meperidine), a Schedule II drug. Chemically, it is a reversed ester of pethidine which has about 70% of the potency of morphine. Unlike its derivative prodine, it does not exhibit optical isomerism. It was reported to have 30 times the activity of pethidine and a greater analgesic effect than morphine in rats, and it was demonstrated to cause central nervous system stimulation in mice.

== History ==
Desmethylprodine was first synthesized in 1947 at Hoffman-LaRoche Laboratories by Albert Ziering and John Lee. They found that it produced effects similar to morphine when administered to rats. Ziering had been searching for synthetic painkillers that were less addictive than morphine. The new drug was a slight variant of pethidine. It was found to be no more effective than pethidine and was never marketed. This research produced the analgesic alphaprodine (Nisentil, Prisilidine), a very closely related compound.

In the United States, MPPP is now in Schedule I of the Controlled Substances Act with a zero aggregate manufacturing quota as of 2014. The free base conversion ratio for salts includes 0.87 for the hydrochloride. It is listed under the Single Convention on Narcotic Drugs and is controlled in most countries in the same fashion as is morphine.

== Toxic impurity ==
In 1976, a 23-year-old graduate student in chemistry named Barry Kidston was searching for a way to make a legal recreational drug. Having read the paper by Ziering and Lee, he deduced that he could make a drug with pethidine's effects without its legal restrictions, because desmethylprodine is a different molecule and had never been addressed by law. Kidston successfully synthesized and used desmethylprodine for several months, after which he suddenly came down with the symptoms of Parkinson's disease and was hospitalized. Physicians were perplexed, because Parkinson's disease would be a great rarity in someone so young, but L-DOPA, the standard drug for Parkinson's, relieved his symptoms. L-DOPA is a precursor for dopamine, the neurotransmitter whose lack produces Parkinson's symptoms.

It was later found that his development of Parkinson's was due to a common impurity in the synthesis of MPPP called 1-methyl-4-phenyl-1,2,3,6-tetrahydropyridine (MPTP), a neurotoxin that specifically targets dopamine-producing neurons. The intermediate tertiary alcohol is liable to dehydration in acidic conditions if the reaction temperature rises above 30 °C. Kidston did not realize this and esterified the intermediate with propionic anhydride at an elevated temperature. Consequently, he produced MPTP as a major impurity.

1-Methyl-4-phenylpyridinium (MPP^{+}), a metabolite of MPTP, causes rapid onset of irreversible symptoms similar to Parkinson's disease. MPTP is metabolized to the neurotoxin MPP^{+} by the enzyme MAO-B, which is expressed in glial cells. This selectively kills brain tissue in the area of the brain called the substantia nigra and causes permanent Parkinsonian symptoms.

== Analogs ==
Structural analogs of desmethylprodine with different N-substituents than a methyl group on the piperidine have been investigated. Several of these have significantly greater in vitro potency compared to desmethylprodine.

== See also ==
- Norpethidine
- PEPAP
