= Chloralodol =

Chemical compound

Clinical data
- ATC code: N05CC02 (WHO)

Legal status
- Legal status: BR: Class C1 (Other controlled substances); US: Schedule III (No longer marketed in the US)

Identifiers
- IUPAC name: 2-methyl-4-(2,2,2-trichloro-1-hydroxyethoxy) pentan-2-ol
- CAS Number: 3563-58-4
- PubChem CID: 19094
- DrugBank: DB01534
- ChemSpider: 18027
- UNII: W8RD4N93R2
- KEGG: D07325
- ChEMBL: ChEMBL2104116
- CompTox Dashboard (EPA): DTXSID8022795
- ECHA InfoCard: 100.020.577

Chemical and physical data
- Formula: C_{8}H_{15}Cl_{3}O_{3}
- Molar mass: 265.56 g·mol^{−1}
- 3D model (JSmol): Interactive image
- SMILES: ClC(Cl)(Cl)C(O)OC(CC(O)(C)C)C
- InChI: InChI=1S/C8H15Cl3O3/c1-5(4-7(2,3)13)14-6(12)8(9,10)11/h5-6,12-13H,4H2,1-3H3; Key:QVFWZNCVPCJQOP-UHFFFAOYSA-N

Chloralodol (chlorhexadol) is a hypnotic/sedative. It is a Schedule III drug in the United States; however, it is not currently marketed in the US so it is no longer prescribed.
