= Tilmetamine =

Clinical data
- Other names: N-Desethyl-N-methyltiletamine
- Drug class: Dissociative; Hallucinogen
- ATC code: None

Identifiers
- IUPAC name: 2-(methylamino)-2-thiophen-2-ylcyclohexan-1-one
- PubChem CID: 164000299

Chemical and physical data
- Formula: C_{11}H_{15}NOS
- Molar mass: 209.31 g·mol^{−1}
- 3D model (JSmol): Interactive image
- SMILES: CNC1(CCCCC1=O)C2=CC=CS2
- InChI: InChI=1S/C11H15NOS/c1-12-11(10-6-4-8-14-10)7-3-2-5-9(11)13/h4,6,8,12H,2-3,5,7H2,1H3; Key:UIKFZAUDYKWGKI-UHFFFAOYSA-N

Tilmetamine is a dissociative drug of the arylcyclohexylamine family related to tiletamine. It is the analogue of tiletamine in which the N-ethyl group has been replaced with an N-methyl group. The drug is said to be 3 to 5 times more potent than ketamine and to have a longer duration. It is reported to produce adverse effects, such as blurred vision. Tilmetamine is expected to act as an NMDA receptor antagonist similarly to tiletamine and ketamine. It was encountered as a novel designer drug online in August 2024.

== See also ==
- Tiletamine
- Arylcyclohexylamine
