= Pethidinic acid =

Chemical compound

Clinical data
- Routes of administration: N/A
- ATC code: none

Legal status
- Legal status: BR: Class A1 (Narcotic drugs); DE: Anlage II (Authorized trade only, not prescriptible); UN: Narcotic Schedule I

Identifiers
- IUPAC name: 1-methyl-4-phenylpiperidine-4-carboxylic acid
- CAS Number: 3627-48-3
- PubChem CID: 101106
- ChemSpider: 91344
- UNII: 4ZGQ154PQY
- KEGG: C22798
- ChEMBL: ChEMBL1201376
- CompTox Dashboard (EPA): DTXSID30189812

Chemical and physical data
- Formula: C_{13}H_{17}NO_{2}
- Molar mass: 219.284 g·mol^{−1}
- 3D model (JSmol): Interactive image
- SMILES: CN1CCC(CC1)(C2=CC=CC=C2)C(=O)O
- InChI: InChI=1S/C13H17NO2/c1-14-9-7-13(8-10-14,12(15)16)11-5-3-2-4-6-11/h2-6H,7-10H2,1H3,(H,15,16); Key:KHUPPYUUMRDAAX-UHFFFAOYSA-N

Pethidinic acid (meperidinic acid, pethidine intermediate C) is a 4-phenylpiperidine derivative that is both a metabolite of and a precursor to pethidine (meperidine). It is scheduled by UN Single Convention on Narcotic Drugs. It is a Schedule II Narcotic controlled substance in the United States and has an ACSCN of 9234. The 2014 annual manufacturing quota was 6 grams.

Pethidinic acid is a controlled drug because of its potential uses in manufacturing both pethidine itself and some of its substituted derivatives, but it has little opioid activity in its own right. Metabolism of pethidine to pethidinic acid is carried out mainly by the carboxylesterase enzyme hCE-1 in the liver, and since the activity of this enzyme can vary between individuals, the rate and extent of pethidinic acid production can vary.

Frank Wätjen used pethidinic acid as a precursor chemical to a heterocyclic moiety.

== See also ==
- Moramide intermediate
- Methadone intermediate
- Pethidine intermediate A
- Pethidine intermediate B (norpethidine)
