= Dextromoramide =

Opioid analgesic drug

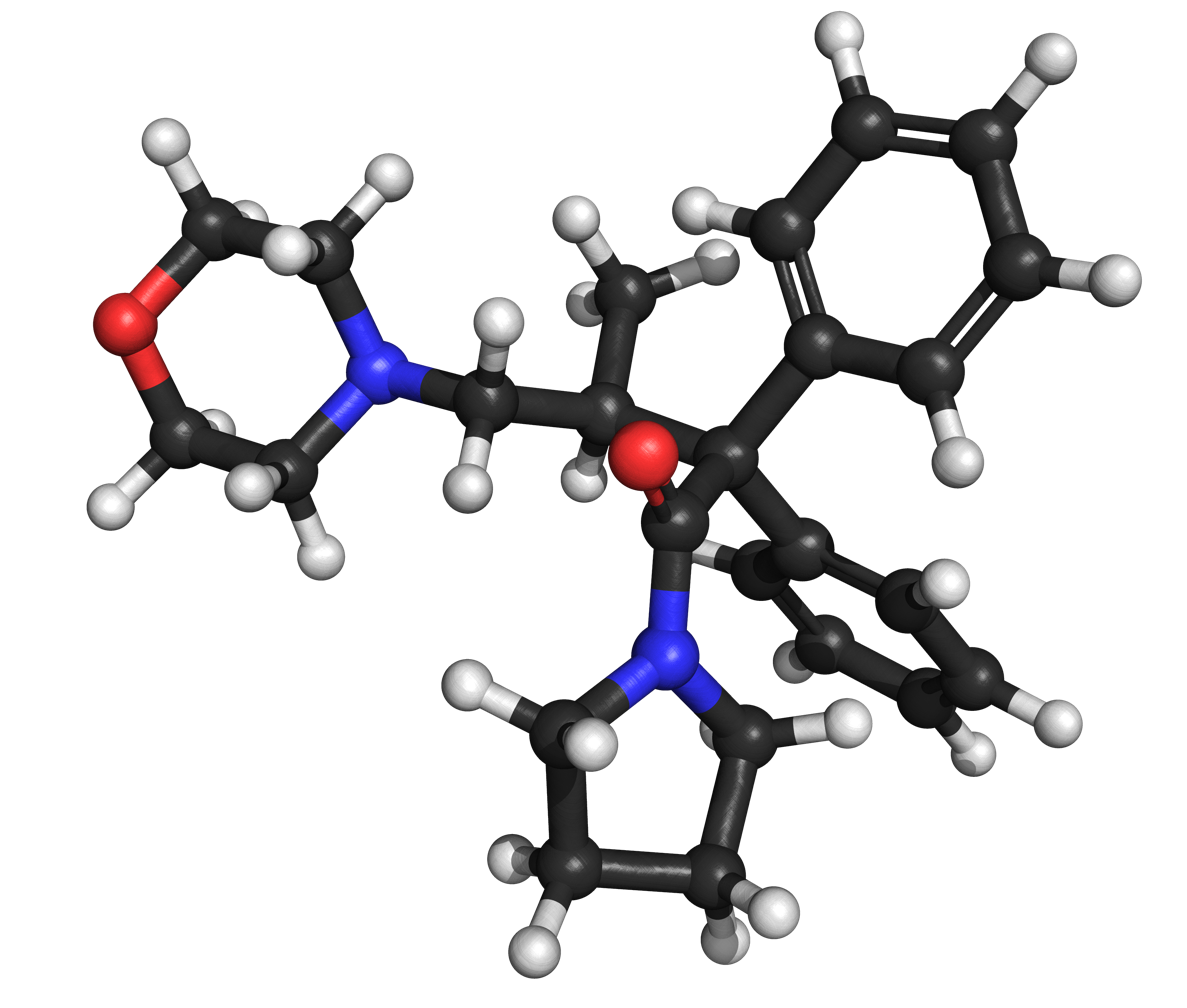
- Above: molecular structure of dextromoramide. Below: 3D representation of a dextromoramide molecule.

Clinical data
- Trade names: Palfium
- AHFS/Drugs.com: International Drug Names
- Pregnancy category: AU: C
- Routes of administration: Oral, Rectal, Intravenous, Insufflation
- ATC code: N02AC01 (WHO)

Legal status
- Legal status: AU: S8 (Controlled drug); BR: Class A1 (Narcotic drugs); CA: Schedule I; DE: Anlage II (Authorized trade only, not prescriptible); US: Schedule I

Pharmacokinetic data
- Bioavailability: >75%
- Protein binding: High
- Metabolism: Liver, partly mediated by CYP3A4
- Elimination half-life: 3.5 hours
- Excretion: Urine, faeces

Identifiers
- IUPAC name: (3S)-3-methyl-4-morpholin-4-yl-2,2-diphenyl-1-pyrrolidin-1-yl-butan-1-one
- CAS Number: 357-56-2
- PubChem CID: 92943
- DrugBank: DB01529
- ChemSpider: 83901
- UNII: 9S4S6CIY83
- KEGG: D07287
- ChEBI: CHEBI:74274
- ChEMBL: ChEMBL431928
- CompTox Dashboard (EPA): DTXSID8022909
- ECHA InfoCard: 100.006.013

Chemical and physical data
- Formula: C_{25}H_{32}N_{2}O_{2}
- Molar mass: 392.543 g·mol^{−1}
- 3D model (JSmol): Interactive image
- SMILES: C[C@H](CN1CCOCC1)C(C(=O)N1CCCC1)(c1ccccc1)c1ccccc1
- InChI: InChI=1S/C25H32N2O2/c1-21(20-26-16-18-29-19-17-26)25(22-10-4-2-5-11-22,23-12-6-3-7-13-23)24(28)27-14-8-9-15-27/h2-7,10-13,21H,8-9,14-20H2,1H3/t21-/m1/s1; Key:INUNXTSAACVKJS-OAQYLSRUSA-N

Dextromoramide (Palfium, Palphium, Jetrium, Dimorlin) is a powerful opioid analgesic approximately three times more potent than morphine but shorter acting. It is subject to drug prohibition regimes, both internationally through UN treaties and by the criminal law of individual nations, and is usually prescribed only in the Netherlands.

== History ==
Dextromoramide was discovered and patented in 1956 by Paul Janssen at Janssen Pharmaceuticals, who also discovered fentanyl, another important synthetic opioid, widely used to treat pain and in combination with other drugs as an anaesthetic, as well as haloperidol, piritramide, the loperamide-diphenoxylate series and other important drugs.

Dextromoramide was much favoured by drug users in Australia in the 1970s and the United Kingdom. It has the main proprietary name of Palfium amongst others, though as of mid-2004 the drug was discontinued in the UK due to limited supplies of precursor chemicals. Although this is true, it is believed there was an approximate one year shortage of Dextromoramide and the real reason that Palfium was not put back into production for the UK market is because of how addictive and potent it is as an oral painkiller. Dependence liability is similar to morphine, but with a less severe withdrawal syndrome.

The only European countries that now use the brand Palfium are the Netherlands, Ireland and Luxembourg. It is presumably able to be imported into other Schengen zone countries under Title 76 of said treaty coming into force in 2002. It is a Schedule I Narcotic controlled substance in the United States, with a DEA ACSCN of 9613 and an annual aggregate manufacturing quota of zero as of 2013, and had been out of use in the United States for around a decade when the new Controlled Substances Act 1970 was promulgated. The salts of dextromoramide in use are the hydrochloride (free base conversion ratio 0.915) and tartrate (0.724). Racemoramide and moramide intermediate are also controlled.

== Medical use ==
The main advantage of this drug is that it has a fast onset of action when taken orally, and has a high bioavailability which means that oral dosing produces almost as much effect as injection. It also has a relatively low tendency to cause constipation which is a common problem with opioid analgesics used for cancer pain relief, and tolerance to the analgesic effects develops relatively slowly compared to most other short-acting opioids.

== Pharmacokinetics ==
Dextromoramide has a mean elimination half life of 215.3 ± 78.4 minutes and volume of distribution of 0.58 ± 0.20 L/kg. Peak plasma levels are reached within 0.5–4.0 h after dosing, decline of plasma concentrations after the peak follow a biphasic pattern, with half-lives of 0.4–1.6 h for the first phase and 6.3–21.8 h for the terminal phase. While in about 40% of patients, half-lives range from 1.5 to 4.7 h, in a monophasic manner. Less than 0.06% of the dose is excreted unchanged in urine within 8 h of administration.

== Chemistry ==
Dextromoramide is the right-handed isomer of the moramide molecule. The left-handed molecule is called levomoramide, and a mixture of the two is called racemoramide. Its full chemical name is (+)-1-(3-Methyl-4-morpholino-2,2-diphenylbutyryl)pyrrolidine, and its molecular formula: C_{25}H_{32}N_{2}O_{2}, with an atomic weight of ~392.5.

Dextromoramide was discovered during the course of research into a related family of compounds, the α,α-Diphenyl-γ-Dialkyamino-Butyramides, which show no analgesic activity, but are extremely active physiologically as inhibitors of gastric secretions in man. Other drugs from this series show antispasmodic and antihistamine effects, but most research was put into researching analgesics.

The structure-activity relationships of this family of drugs was investigated extensively, with dextromoramide representing the optimisation of several different structural features;

(i) at the 1-amide group only the pyrrolidine and dimethylamide substituents were active, with pyrrolidine being more potent

(ii) the alkyl chain was more potent when methylated, 3-methylation was more potent than 4-methylation, and in the 3-methyl analogues the dextro isomer was more active

(iii) while morpholine, dimethylamine, pyrrolidine and piperidine were all active at the 4-amine group, morpholine was the most active

(iv) any substitution on the phenyl rings reduces activity.

So dextromoramide, with a pyrrolidine ring on the 1-amide position, a dextro methyl group on the 3-position of the alkyl chain, a morpholine ring around the 4-amine group, and both phenyl rings unsubstituted, was by far the most potent out of all the compounds in this series and was the only one that became widely used in medicine (although the racemic mix racemoramide saw some limited use).
