= 2α-(Propanoyl)-3β-(2-(6-methoxynaphthyl))-tropane =

Chemical compound

Identifiers
- IUPAC name: 2α-(Propanoyl)-3β-(2-(6-methoxynaphthyl))-tropane
- CAS Number: 252958-03-5

Chemical and physical data
- Formula: C_{22}H_{27}NO_{2}
- Molar mass: 337.463 g·mol^{−1}
- 3D model (JSmol): Interactive image
- SMILES: CCC(=O)[C@H]1C(CC2)N(C)C2C[C@@H]1C3=CC=C4C=C(OC)C=CC4=C3
- InChI: InChI=1S/C22H27NO2/c1-4-21(24)22-19(13-17-8-10-20(22)23(17)2)16-6-5-15-12-18(25-3)9-7-14(15)11-16/h5-7,9,11-12,17,19-20,22H,4,8,10,13H2,1-3H3/t17?,19-,20?,22-/m1/s1; Key:NBXHPPSAAQZXHP-HJSRJYPHSA-N

2α-(Propanoyl)-3β-(2-(6-methoxynaphthyl))-tropane or WF-33 is a cocaine analogue. It, along with WF-23 the other "2-naphthyl" cocaine analogue, are considered the more potent of the WF series cocaine analogues.

== See also ==
- List of cocaine analogues
