= Methadone intermediate =

Chemical compound

Clinical data
- Routes of administration: N/A
- ATC code: none

Legal status
- Legal status: AU: S9 (Prohibited substance); BR: Class A1 (Narcotic drugs); DE: Anlage II (Authorized trade only, not prescriptible); UN: Narcotic Schedule I

Identifiers
- IUPAC name: 4-cyano-2-dimethylamino-4,4-diphenylbutane
- CAS Number: 125-79-1
- PubChem CID: 31331
- ChemSpider: 29065
- UNII: 0GYB2HJA89
- KEGG: C22686
- CompTox Dashboard (EPA): DTXSID1048912
- ECHA InfoCard: 100.004.324

Chemical and physical data
- Formula: C_{19}H_{22}N_{2}
- Molar mass: 278.399 g·mol^{−1}
- 3D model (JSmol): Interactive image
- SMILES: CC(CC(C#N)(C1=CC=CC=C1)C2=CC=CC=C2)N(C)C
- InChI: InChI=1S/C19H22N2/c1-16(21(2)3)14-19(15-20,17-10-6-4-7-11-17)18-12-8-5-9-13-18/h4-13,16H,14H2,1-3H3; Key:GJJQIGFCGLPOQK-UHFFFAOYSA-N

Methadone intermediate (pre-methadone, methadone nitrile, dimethylaminodiphenylbutanonitrile) is a methadone precursor scheduled by UN Single Convention on Narcotic Drugs. It is a Schedule II Narcotic controlled substance in the United States and has an ACSCN of 9254. The 2014 annual manufacturing quota was 32 875 kilos. It is listed as a Schedule I drug in Canada, but is only significant as a precursor for methadone, as it does not have analgesic activity in its own right, though it does show some atropine-like activity.

== See also ==
- Moramide intermediate
- Pethidine intermediate A
- Pethidine intermediate B (norpethidine)
- Pethidine intermediate C (pethidinic acid)
