= Pethidine intermediate A =

Chemical compound

Clinical data
- Routes of administration: N/A
- ATC code: none

Legal status
- Legal status: BR: Class A1 (Narcotic drugs); DE: Anlage II (Authorized trade only, not prescriptible); US: Schedule II; UN: Narcotic Schedule I

Identifiers
- IUPAC name: 1-methyl-4-phenylpiperidine-4-carbonitrile
- CAS Number: 3627-62-1
- PubChem CID: 62513
- ChemSpider: 56289
- UNII: EL4L2474TY
- KEGG: C22687
- CompTox Dashboard (EPA): DTXSID50189814
- ECHA InfoCard: 100.020.771

Chemical and physical data
- Formula: C_{13}H_{16}N_{2}
- Molar mass: 200.285 g·mol^{−1}
- 3D model (JSmol): Interactive image
- SMILES: CN1CCC(CC1)(C#N)c2ccccc2
- InChI: InChI=1S/C13H16N2/c1-15-9-7-13(11-14,8-10-15)12-5-3-2-4-6-12/h2-6H,7-10H2,1H3; Key:ZLFQTZYFXYOGLS-UHFFFAOYSA-N

Pethidine intermediate A is a four-phenylpiperidine derivative that is a precursor to the opioid analgesic drug pethidine (meperidine). It is not known to have any analgesic activity in its own right, however other derivatives of pethidine with a 4-cyano group in place of the carboxylate ethyl ester have been found to be active, so pethidine intermediate A might also show opioid effects. It is scheduled by UN Single Convention on Narcotic Drugs. It is a Schedule II Narcotic controlled substance in the United States and has an ACSCN of 9232. The 2014 annual manufacturing quota was 6 grammes (as an end product, presumably for research use).

== See also ==
- Moramide intermediate
- Methadone intermediate
- Pethidine intermediate B (norpethidine)
- Pethidine intermediate C (pethidinic acid)
