= Serotonergic =

A serotonergic substance, medication, or receptor protein is one that affects neurotransmission pathways that involve serotonin, as follows:

- Serotonergic drugs
  - Serotonin receptor agonists
  - Serotonin receptor antagonists
  - Serotonin reuptake inhibitors
  - Serotonin releasing agents
  - Serotonergic psychedelics
- Serotonergic cells
  - Serotonergic cell groups
