= Pheneridine =

Chemical compound

Clinical data
- ATC code: none

Identifiers
- IUPAC name: Ethyl 4-phenyl-1-(2-phenylethyl)piperidine-4-carboxylate
- CAS Number: 469-80-7
- PubChem CID: 3029031
- ChemSpider: 2294381
- UNII: 2UG271VI0Z
- ChEMBL: ChEMBL285517
- CompTox Dashboard (EPA): DTXSID60196978

Chemical and physical data
- Formula: C_{22}H_{27}NO_{2}
- Molar mass: 337.463 g·mol^{−1}
- 3D model (JSmol): Interactive image
- SMILES: O=C(OCC)C3(c1ccccc1)CCN(CCc2ccccc2)CC3
- InChI: InChI=1S/C22H27NO2/c1-2-25-21(24)22(20-11-7-4-8-12-20)14-17-23(18-15-22)16-13-19-9-5-3-6-10-19/h3-12H,2,13-18H2,1H3; Key:IUNKCJPURQMGKG-UHFFFAOYSA-N

Pheneridine is a 4-phenylpiperidine derivative that is related to the opioid analgesic drug pethidine (meperidine).

Pheneridine is not currently used in medicine. Presumably it has similar effects to other opioid derivatives, such as analgesia, sedation, nausea and respiratory depression, however unlike most opioid derivatives it is not specifically listed as an illegal drug, although it would probably be regarded as a controlled substance analogue of pethidine on the grounds of its related chemical structure in some jurisdictions such as the United States, Canada and Australia, and would be classified as a "Pethidine Analogue" under the New Zealand Misuse of Drugs Act Class C7.

== See also ==
- Anileridine
- PEPAP
- Diphenoxylate
- Pethidine
