= Moramide intermediate =

Chemical compound

Clinical data
- Trade names: β-Methyl-α,α-diphenyl-4-morpholinebutanoic acid
- Other names: 4-Morpholinebutanoic acid, β-methyl-α,α-diphenyl-, moramide intermediate
- Routes of administration: N/A
- ATC code: none

Legal status
- Legal status: AU: S9 (Prohibited substance); BR: Class A1 (Narcotic drugs); DE: Anlage II (Authorized trade only, not prescriptible); US: Schedule II; UN: Narcotic Schedule I

Identifiers
- IUPAC name: 3-Methyl-4-morpholin-4-yl-2,2-diphenylbutanoic acid
- CAS Number: 3626-55-9
- PubChem CID: 567581
- ChemSpider: 493453
- UNII: 4O5ZQW8AMM
- KEGG: C22688
- CompTox Dashboard (EPA): DTXSID401045346

Chemical and physical data
- Formula: C_{21}H_{25}NO_{3}
- Molar mass: 339.435 g·mol^{−1}
- 3D model (JSmol): Interactive image
- SMILES: O=C(O)C(c1ccccc1)(c2ccccc2)C(C)CN3CCOCC3
- InChI: InChI=1S/C21H25NO3/c1-17(16-22-12-14-25-15-13-22)21(20(23)24,18-8-4-2-5-9-18)19-10-6-3-7-11-19/h2-11,17H,12-16H2,1H3,(H,23,24); Key:AWLNVHVUYACOMZ-UHFFFAOYSA-N

Moramide intermediate (β-Methyl-α,α-diphenyl-4-morpholinebutanoic acid, on INCB Yellow List as 2-methyl-3-morpholino-1,1-diphenylpropane carboxylic acid) is a moramide precursor scheduled by UN Single Convention on Narcotic Drugs.

In the United States, moramide intermediate is designated as a Schedule II controlled substance, and has an ACSCN of 9802. The 2014 annual manufacturing quota was nil.

In Australia, moramide intermediate is listed as a Schedule 9 (Prohibited Substance)

== See also ==
- Moramide
- Methadone intermediate
- Pethidine intermediate A
- Pethidine intermediate B (norpethidine)
- Pethidine intermediate C (pethidinic acid)
