= Anileridine =

Analgesic drug

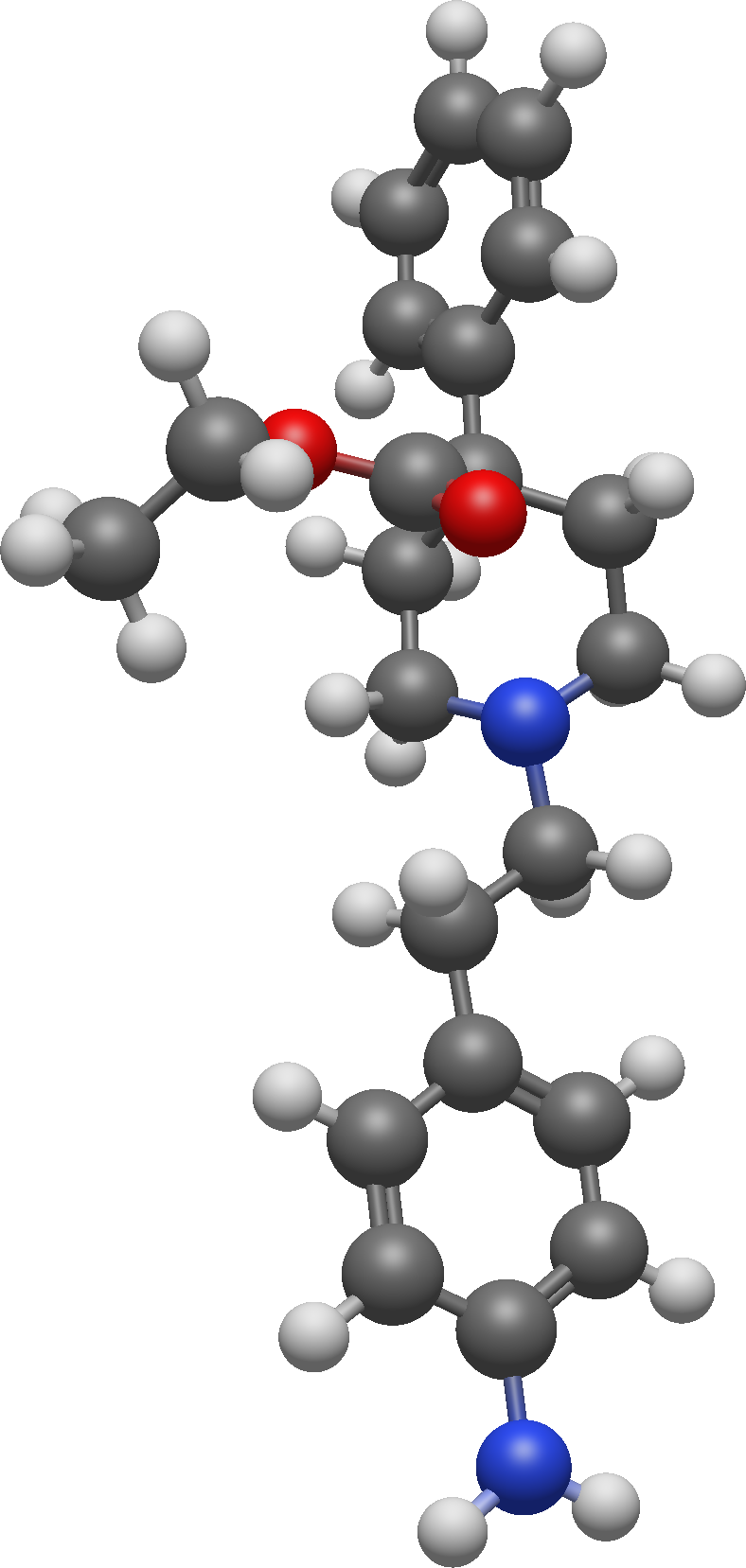

Clinical data
- Trade names: Leritine
- AHFS/Drugs.com: Monograph
- Routes of administration: Tablets, injection
- ATC code: N01AH05 (WHO)

Legal status
- Legal status: AU: S8 (Controlled drug); BR: Class A1 (Narcotic drugs); CA: Schedule I; DE: Anlage I (Authorized scientific use only); US: Schedule II

Pharmacokinetic data
- Protein binding: > 95%
- Metabolism: Hepatic

Identifiers
- IUPAC name: Ethyl 1-[2-(4-aminophenyl)ethyl]-4-phenylpiperidine-4-carboxylate
- CAS Number: 144-14-9
- PubChem CID: 8944
- IUPHAR/BPS: 7115
- DrugBank: DB00913
- ChemSpider: 8600
- UNII: 71Q1A3O279
- KEGG: D02941
- ChEBI: CHEBI:61203
- ChEMBL: ChEMBL1201347
- CompTox Dashboard (EPA): DTXSID8022610

Chemical and physical data
- Formula: C_{22}H_{28}N_{2}O_{2}
- Molar mass: 352.478 g·mol^{−1}
- 3D model (JSmol): Interactive image
- Melting point: 83 °C (181 °F)
- SMILES: O=C(OCC)C3(c1ccccc1)CCN(CCc2ccc(N)cc2)CC3
- InChI: InChI=1S/C22H28N2O2/c1-2-26-21(25)22(19-6-4-3-5-7-19)13-16-24(17-14-22)15-12-18-8-10-20(23)11-9-18/h3-11H,2,12-17,23H2,1H3; Key:LKYQLAWMNBFNJT-UHFFFAOYSA-N

Anileridine (trade name: Leritine) is a synthetic analgesic drug and is a member of the piperidine class of analgesic agents developed by Merck & Co. in the 1950s. It differs from pethidine (meperidine) in that the N-methyl group of meperidine is replaced by an N-aminophenethyl group, which increases its analgesic activity.

Anileridine is no longer manufactured in the US or Canada. Anileridine is in Schedule II of the Controlled Substances Act 1970 of the United States as ACSCN 9020 with a zero aggregate manufacturing quota as of 2014. The free base conversion ratio for salts includes 0.83 for the dihydrochloride and 0.73 for the phosphate. It is also under international control per UN treaties.

== Administration ==
As tablets or injection.

== Pharmacokinetics ==
Anileridine usually takes effect within 15 minutes of either oral or intravenous administration, and lasts 2–3 hours. It is mostly metabolized by the liver.

== See also ==
- Pheneridine
