= Levomoramide =

Chemical compound

Clinical data
- ATC code: none

Legal status
- Legal status: AU: S8 (Controlled drug); BR: Class A1 (Narcotic drugs); CA: Schedule I; DE: Anlage II (Authorized trade only, not prescriptible); US: Schedule I; UN: Narcotic Schedule I

Identifiers
- IUPAC name: (3R)-3-methyl-4-morpholin-4-yl-2,2-diphenyl-1-pyrrolidin-1-yl-butan-1-one
- CAS Number: 5666-11-5
- PubChem CID: 10453145
- ChemSpider: 8628561
- UNII: 7M86YFN15D
- KEGG: D12695
- CompTox Dashboard (EPA): DTXSID401016989
- ECHA InfoCard: 100.024.658

Chemical and physical data
- Formula: C_{25}H_{32}N_{2}O_{2}
- Molar mass: 392.543 g·mol^{−1}
- 3D model (JSmol): Interactive image
- SMILES: C[C@@H](CN1CCOCC1)C(c1ccccc1)(c1ccccc1)C(=O)N1CCCC1
- InChI: InChI=1S/C25H32N2O2/c1-21(20-26-16-18-29-19-17-26)25(22-10-4-2-5-11-22,23-12-6-3-7-13-23)24(28)27-14-8-9-15-27/h2-7,10-13,21H,8-9,14-20H2,1H3/t21-/m0/s1; Key:INUNXTSAACVKJS-NRFANRHFSA-N

Levomoramide is the inactive isomer of the opioid analgesic dextromoramide, invented by the chemist Paul Janssen in 1956. Unlike dextromoramide, which is a potent analgesic with high abuse potential, levomoramide is virtually without activity.

"Resolution reveals that the analgetic activity in this case resides almost entirely in the (+) isomer."

"In the α-CH_{3} series, one of the optical isomers of each enantiomorphic pair is about twice as active as the racemic mixture; the other isomer is devoid of significant analgesic activity."

However, despite being inactive, levomoramide is scheduled by UN Single Convention on Narcotic Drugs.
