= Piminodine =

Opioid analgesic drug

Clinical data
- ATC code: none

Legal status
- Legal status: BR: Class A1 (Narcotic drugs)

Identifiers
- IUPAC name: ethyl 1-(3-anilinopropyl)-4-phenylpiperidine-4-carboxylate
- CAS Number: 13495-09-5
- PubChem CID: 21950
- ChemSpider: 20628
- UNII: 3IIX447HWS
- KEGG: D12683
- CompTox Dashboard (EPA): DTXSID60159149
- ECHA InfoCard: 100.033.455

Chemical and physical data
- Formula: C_{23}H_{30}N_{2}O_{2}
- Molar mass: 366.505 g·mol^{−1}
- 3D model (JSmol): Interactive image
- SMILES: O=C(OCC)C3(c1ccccc1)CCN(CCCNc2ccccc2)CC3
- InChI: InChI=1S/C23H30N2O2/c1-2-27-22(26)23(20-10-5-3-6-11-20)14-18-25(19-15-23)17-9-16-24-21-12-7-4-8-13-21/h3-8,10-13,24H,2,9,14-19H2,1H3; Key:PXXKIYPSXYFATG-UHFFFAOYSA-N; InChI=1/C23H30N2O2/c1-2-27-22(26)23(20-10-5-3-6-11-20)14-18-25(19-15-23)17-9-16-24-21-12-7-4-8-13-21/h3-8,10-13,24H,2,9,14-19H2,1H3; Key:PXXKIYPSXYFATG-UHFFFAOYAI

Piminodine (Alvodine) is an opioid analgesic that is an analogue of pethidine (meperidine). It was used in medicine briefly during the 1960s and 70s, but has largely fallen out of clinical use. It was used particularly for obstetric analgesia and in dental procedures and, like pethidine, could be combined with hydroxyzine to intensify the effects. The duration of action is 2–4 hours; 7.5–10 mg via the subcutaneous route is the most common starting dose, being equal to 80–100 mg of pethidine, 40–60 mg of alphaprodine and 10 mg of morphine. Oral formulations were also available.

Piminodine has similar effects to other opioids, and produces analgesia, sedation and euphoria. Side effects can include itching, nausea and potentially serious respiratory depression which can be life-threatening.
