= Pethidine =

Opioid analgesic

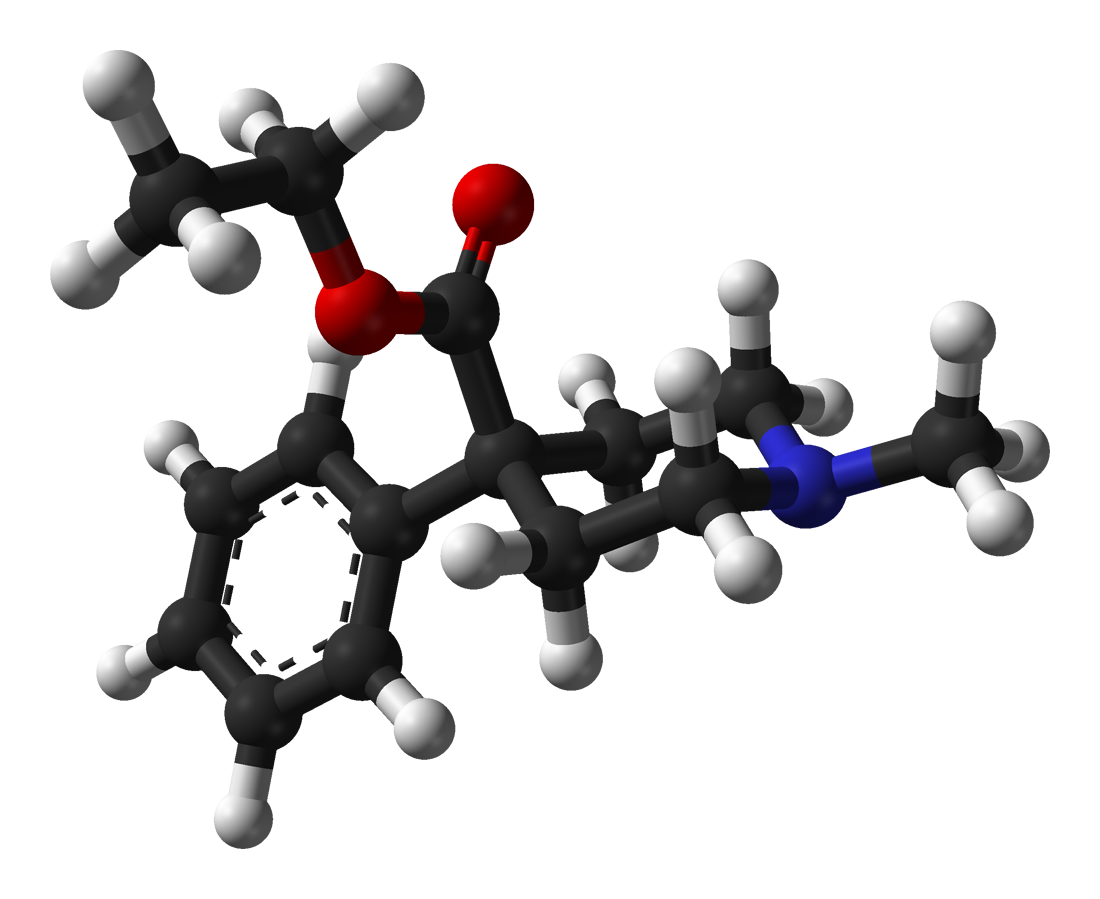

Clinical data
- Trade names: Demerol, others
- Other names: Meperidine (USAN US)
- Pregnancy category: AU: C
- Dependence liability: High
- Addiction liability: High
- Routes of administration: By mouth, intravenous, intramuscular, intrathecal, subcutaneous, epidural
- Drug class: Opioid
- ATC code: N02AB02 (WHO)

Legal status
- Legal status: AU: S8 (Controlled drug); BR: Class A1 (Narcotic drugs); CA: Schedule I; DE: Anlage III (Special prescription form required); NZ: Class B; UK: Class A; US: Schedule II; UN: Narcotic Schedule I; SE: Förteckning II In general: ℞ (Prescription only)

Pharmacokinetic data
- Bioavailability: 50–60% (Oral), 80–90% (Oral, in cases of hepatic impairment)
- Protein binding: 65–75%
- Metabolism: Liver: CYP2B6, CYP3A4, CYP2C19, Carboxylesterase 1
- Metabolites: Norpethidine; Pethidinic acid; others
- Elimination half-life: 2.5–4 hours, 7–11 hours (liver disease)
- Excretion: Renal

Identifiers
- IUPAC name: Ethyl 1-methyl-4-phenylpiperidine-4-carboxylate
- CAS Number: 57-42-1
- PubChem CID: 4058
- IUPHAR/BPS: 7221
- DrugBank: DB00454
- ChemSpider: 3918
- UNII: 9E338QE28F
- KEGG: D08343
- ChEBI: CHEBI:6754
- ChEMBL: ChEMBL607
- CompTox Dashboard (EPA): DTXSID9023253
- ECHA InfoCard: 100.000.299

Chemical and physical data
- Formula: C_{15}H_{21}NO_{2}
- Molar mass: 247.338 g·mol^{−1}
- 3D model (JSmol): Interactive image
- SMILES: CCOC(=O)C1(c2ccccc2)CCN(C)CC1
- InChI: InChI=1S/C15H21NO2/c1-3-18-14(17)15(9-11-16(2)12-10-15)13-7-5-4-6-8-13/h4-8H,3,9-12H2,1-2H3; Key:XADCESSVHJOZHK-UHFFFAOYSA-N

Pethidine, also known as meperidine and sold under the brand name Demerol among others, is a fully synthetic opioid pain medication of the phenylpiperidine class. Synthesized in 1938 as a potential anticholinergic agent by the German chemist Otto Eisleb, its analgesic properties were first recognized by Otto Schaumann while working for IG Farben, in Germany. Pethidine is the prototype of a large family of analgesics including the pethidine 4-phenylpiperidines (e.g., piminodine, anileridine), the prodines (e.g., alphaprodine, MPPP), bemidones (e.g., ketobemidone), and others more distant, including diphenoxylate and analogues.

Pethidine is indicated for the treatment of moderate to severe pain, and is delivered as a hydrochloride salt in tablets, as a syrup, or by intramuscular, subcutaneous, or intravenous injection. For much of the 20th century, pethidine was the opioid of choice for many physicians; in 1975, 60% of doctors prescribed it for acute pain and 22% for chronic severe pain.

It was patented in 1937 and approved for medical use in 1943. Compared with morphine, pethidine was considered to be safer, carry a lower risk of addiction, and to be superior in treating the pain associated with biliary spasm or renal colic due to its assumed anticholinergic effects. These were later discovered to be inaccurate assumptions, as it carries an equal risk of addiction and possesses no advantageous effects on biliary spasm or renal colic compared to other opioids. Due to the neurotoxicity of its metabolite, norpethidine, it is more toxic than other opioids—especially during long-term use. The norpethidine metabolite was found to have serotonergic effects, so pethidine could, unlike most opioids, increase the risk of triggering serotonin syndrome.

== Medical uses ==
Pethidine is the most widely used opioid in labour and delivery. It has fallen out of favour in some countries, such as the United States, in favour of other opioids, due to its potential drug interactions, especially with serotonergics, and its neurotoxic metabolite, norpethidine. It is still commonly used in the United Kingdom and New Zealand, and was the preferred opioid in the United Kingdom for use during labour, but has been superseded somewhat by other strong semi-synthetic opioids (e.g. hydromorphone) to avoid serotonin interactions since the mid-2000s.

Pethidine is the preferred painkiller for diverticulitis, because it decreases intestinal intraluminal pressure. Pethidine is the preferred drug for the management of shivering during therapeutic hypothermia, as it provides the greatest reduction in the shivering threshold.

Before 2003, it was on the World Health Organization's List of Essential Medicines, the most effective and safe medicines needed in a health system.

== Adverse effects ==
The adverse effects of pethidine administration are primarily those of the opioids as a class: nausea, vomiting, dizziness, diaphoresis, urinary retention, and constipation. Due to moderate stimulant effects mediated by pethidine's dopamine and norepinephrine reuptake inhibition, sedation is less likely compared to other opioids. Unlike other opioids, it does not cause miosis because of its anticholinergic properties. Overdose can cause muscle flaccidity, respiratory depression, obtundation, psychosis, cold and clammy skin, hypotension, and coma.

A narcotic antagonist such as naloxone is indicated to reverse respiratory depression and other effects of pethidine. Serotonin syndrome has occurred in patients receiving concurrent antidepressant therapy with selective serotonin reuptake inhibitors (SSRIs) or monoamine oxidase inhibitors, or other medication types (see Interactions below). Convulsive seizures sometimes observed in patients receiving parenteral pethidine on a chronic basis have been attributed to accumulation in plasma of the metabolite norpethidine (normeperidine). Fatalities have occurred following either oral or intravenous pethidine overdose.

== Interactions ==
Pethidine has serious interactions that can be dangerous with monoamine oxidase inhibitors (e.g., furazolidone, isocarboxazid, moclobemide, phenelzine, procarbazine, selegiline, tranylcypromine). Such patients may suffer agitation, delirium, headache, convulsions, and/or hyperthermia. Fatal interactions have been reported including the death of Libby Zion.

Seizures may develop when tramadol is given intravenously following, or with, pethidine. It can interact as well with SSRIs and other antidepressants, antiparkinson agents, migraine therapy, stimulants and other agents causing serotonin syndrome. It is thought to be caused by an increase in cerebral serotonin concentrations. It is probable that pethidine can also interact with a number of other medications including muscle relaxants and benzodiazepines, and other substances such as alcohol.

== Mechanism of action ==
Like morphine, pethidine exerts its analgesic effects by acting as an agonist at the μ-opioid receptor.

Pethidine is often employed in the treatment of postanesthetic shivering. The pharmacologic mechanism of this antishivering effect is not fully understood, but it may involve the stimulation of κ-opioid receptors.

Pethidine has structural similarities to atropine and other tropane alkaloids and may have some of their effects and side effects. In addition to these opioidergic and anticholinergic effects, it has local anesthetic activity related to its interactions with sodium ion channels.

Pethidine's apparent in vitro efficacy as an antispasmodic agent is due to its local anesthetic effects. It does not have antispasmodic effects in vivo. Pethidine also has stimulant effects mediated by its inhibition of the dopamine transporter (DAT) and norepinephrine transporter (NET). Pethidine will substitute for cocaine in animals trained to discriminate cocaine from saline, probably as a result of its inhibitory actions on DAT and NET.

Several analogs of pethidine such as 4-fluoropethidine have been synthesized that are potent inhibitors of the reuptake of the monoamine neurotransmitters dopamine and norepinephrine via DAT and NET. It has also been associated with cases of serotonin syndrome, suggesting some interaction with serotonergic neurons, but the relationship has not been definitively demonstrated.

It is more lipid-soluble than morphine, resulting in a faster onset of action. Its duration of clinical effect is 120–150 minutes, although it is typically administered at 4– to 6-hour intervals. Pethidine has been shown to be less effective than morphine, diamorphine, or hydromorphone at easing severe pain, or pain associated with movement or coughing.

Like other opioid drugs, pethidine has the potential to cause physical dependence or addiction. The especially severe side effects unique to pethidine among opioids—serotonin syndrome, seizures, delirium, dysphoria, tremor—are primarily or entirely due to the action of its metabolite, norpethidine.

== Pharmacology ==
=== Pharmacodynamics ===
Pethidine has weak binding affinity for the mu-opioid receptor in humans at 450.1 nM (Morphine 1.168).

=== Pharmacokinetics ===
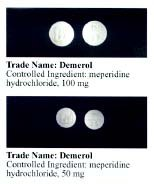

Pethidine is quickly hydrolysed in the liver to pethidinic acid and is also demethylated to norpethidine, which has half the analgesic activity of pethidine but a longer elimination half-life (8–12 hours); accumulating with regular administration, or in kidney failure. Norpethidine is toxic and has convulsant and hallucinogenic effects.

The toxic effects mediated by the metabolites cannot be countered with opioid receptor antagonists such as naloxone or naltrexone, and are probably primarily due to norpethidine's anticholinergic activity probably due to its structural similarity to atropine, though its pharmacology has not been thoroughly explored. The neurotoxicity of pethidine's metabolites is a unique feature of pethidine compared to other opioids. Pethidine's metabolites are further conjugated with glucuronic acid and excreted into the urine.

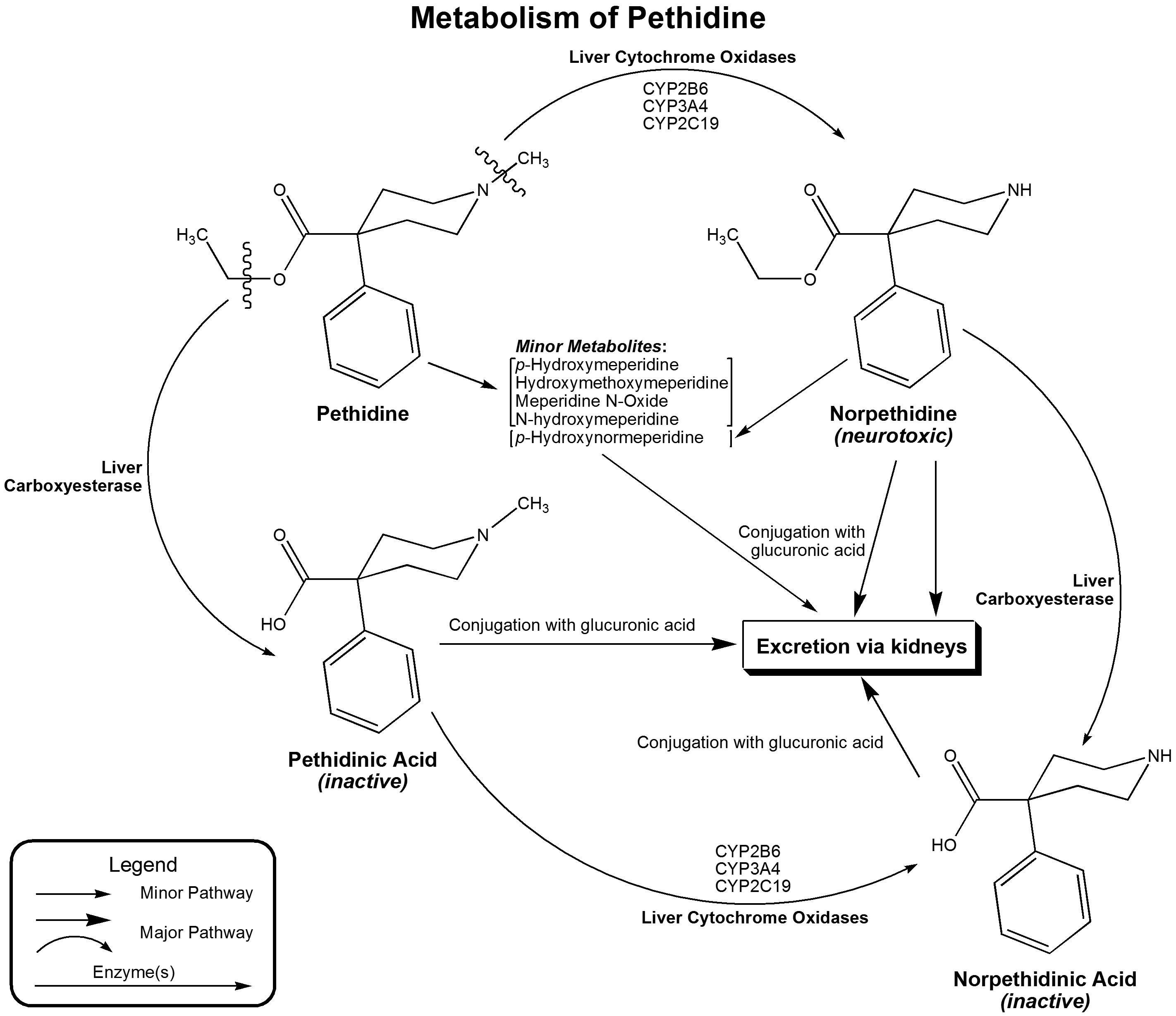

== Synthesis ==
Pethidine can be produced in a two-step synthesis. The first step is reaction of benzyl cyanide and chlormethine in the presence of sodium amide to form a piperidine ring. The nitrile is then converted to an ester.

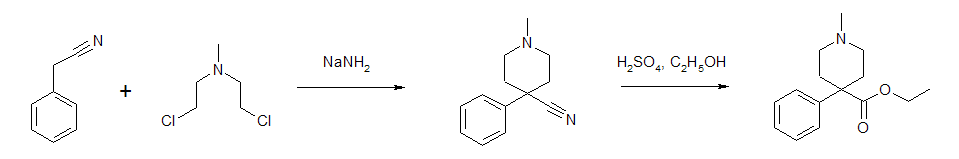
Pethidine synthesis

== Society and culture ==
=== Recreational use ===
==== Trends ====
In data from the US Drug Abuse Warning Network, mentions of hazardous or harmful use of pethidine declined between 1997 and 2002, in contrast to increases for fentanyl, hydromorphone, morphine, and oxycodone. The number of dosage units of pethidine reported lost or stolen in the US increased 16.2% between 2000 and 2003, from 32,447 to 37,687.

=== Legal status ===
Pethidine is in Schedule II of the Controlled Substances Act 1970 of the United States as a Narcotic with ACSCN 9230 with a 6250 kilo aggregate manufacturing quota as of 2014. The free base conversion ratio for salts includes 0.87 for the hydrochloride and 0.84 for the hydrobromide. The A, B, and C intermediates in production of pethidine are also controlled, with ACSCN being 9232 for A (with a 6 gram quota) and 9233 being B (quota of 11 grams) and 9234 being C (6 gram quota). It is listed under the Single Convention for the Control of Narcotic Substances 1961 and is controlled in most countries in the same fashion as is morphine.

== Veterinary use ==
Pethidine provides analgesia for 60 to 90 minutes in the cat and dog. Pethidine is less effective in horses, with IV, SC, and IM administration failing to provide thermal antinociception. Epidural administration of pethidine into the caudal area provided 4-5 hours of analgesia with no cardiovascular depression and only minor sedation. Due to the short duration of analgesia and side effects pethidine is not commonly used with other opioids being used instead.

Pethidine is vagolytic but high doses cause bradycardia due to cardiac depression. Pethidine is metabolised by the hepatic enzyme CYP450 via N-demethylation to produce normeperidine. Normeperidine is excitotoxic and can cause myoclonus when too much pethidine is administered. The treatment for these side effects are benzodiazepines. Histamine release following IV administration can cause flare reaction, pruritus, hypersalivation, urination, defaecation, and tachypnoea. IM injection can cause localised oedema and erythema.

== See also ==
- Libby Zion Law (a case involving phenelzine and pethidine)
