= Single Convention on Narcotic Drugs =

1961 international treaty regulating narcotic drugs

Single Convention on Narcotic Drugs, 1961
Single Convention on Narcotic Drugs, 1961, as amended by the Protocol amending the Single Convention on Narcotic Drugs, 1961
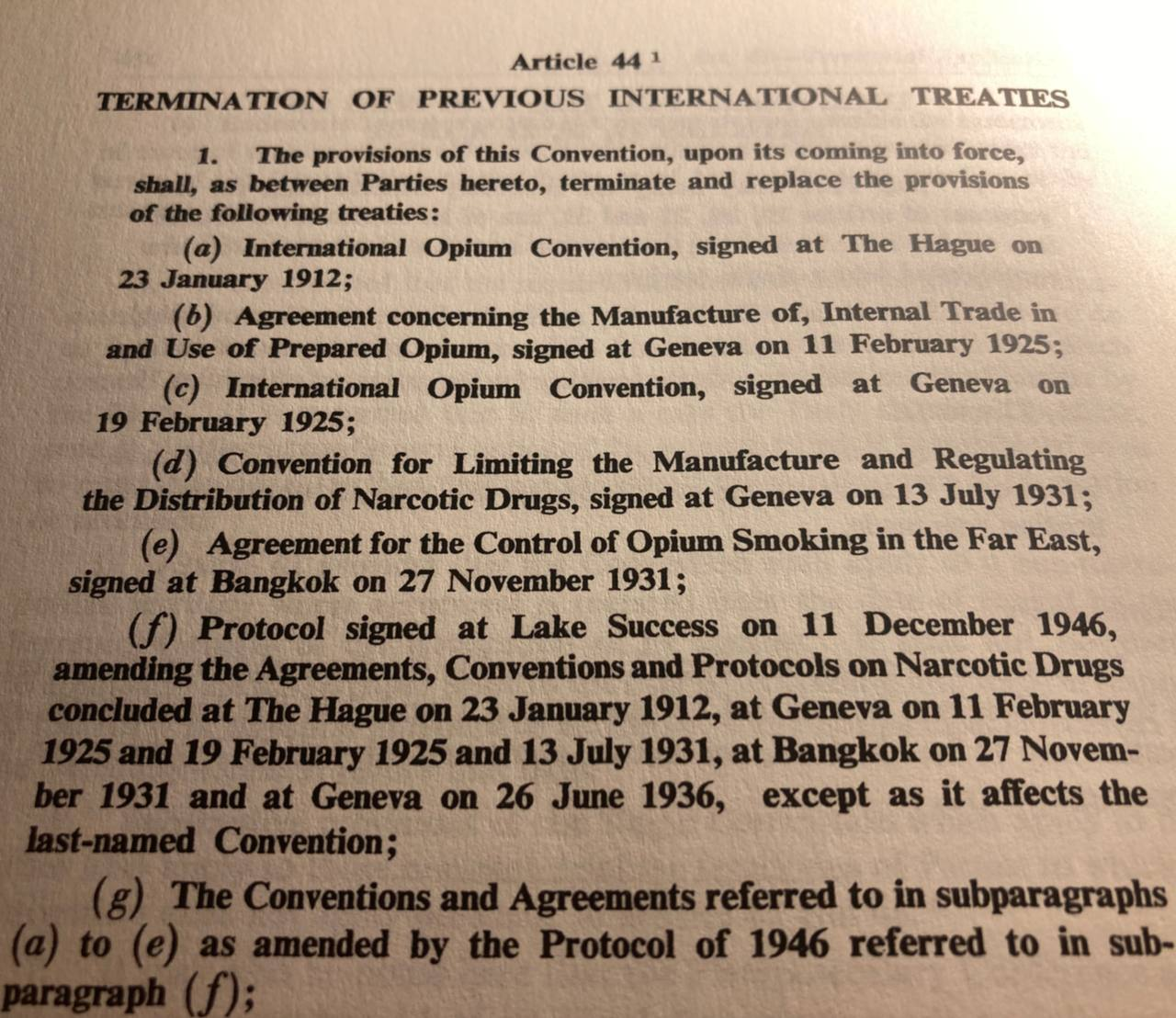
- Article 44 of the Convention terminated a number of previous drug control treaties.
- Signed: 30 March 1961; 8 August 1972 (amendment)
- Location: Manhattan, New York City
- Effective: 13 December 1964 (original text); 8 August 1975 (as amended in 1972)
- Condition: 40 ratifications
- Parties: 186 (as of 2022)
- Depositary: Secretary-General of the United Nations
- Languages: Arabic, Chinese, English, French, Russian, and Spanish

Full text
- Single Convention on Narcotic Drugs at Wikisource

The Single Convention on Narcotic Drugs, 1961 (also called the Single Convention, 1961 Convention, or C61) is an international treaty that controls activities (cultivation, production, supply, trade, transport) involving specific narcotic drugs and lays down a system of regulations (licenses, measures for treatment, research, etc.) for their medical and scientific uses, concluded under the auspices of the United Nations. The convention also establishes the International Narcotics Control Board.

The Single Convention was adopted in 1961 and amended in 1972. As of 2022, the Single Convention as amended has been ratified by 186 countries. The convention has since been supplemented by the 1971 Convention on Psychotropic Substances, which controls LSD, MDMA, and other psychoactive pharmaceuticals, and the 1988 United Nations Convention Against Illicit Traffic in Narcotic Drugs and Psychotropic Substances; the three conventions establish the legal framework for international drug control.

== Ratification ==
The Single Convention as amended in 1972 had been ratified or acceded to by 186 states. Only Chad remained party to the original 1961 Convention in its unamended form. The Cook Islands, Equatorial Guinea, Kiribati, Nauru, Niue, Samoa, South Sudan, Timor-Leste, Tuvalu, and Vanuatu are not parties.

Since the Single Convention is not self-executing, parties must enact legislation to carry out its provisions, and the UNODC works with countries' legislatures to ensure compliance.

== History ==
The League of Nations adopted several drug control treaties prior to World War II, such as the First and Second International Opium Convention, and International Convention relating to Dangerous Drugs (1925) specifying uniform controls on addictive drugs such as cocaine and opium, and its derivatives. However, the lists of controlled substances were fixed in the treaties' text. Consequently, it was necessary to periodically amend or supersede the conventions with the introduction of new treaties to keep up with advances in chemistry. According to a 1954 interview with United States Commissioner of Narcotics Harry J. Anslinger, the cumbersome process of conference and state-by-state ratification could take many decades.

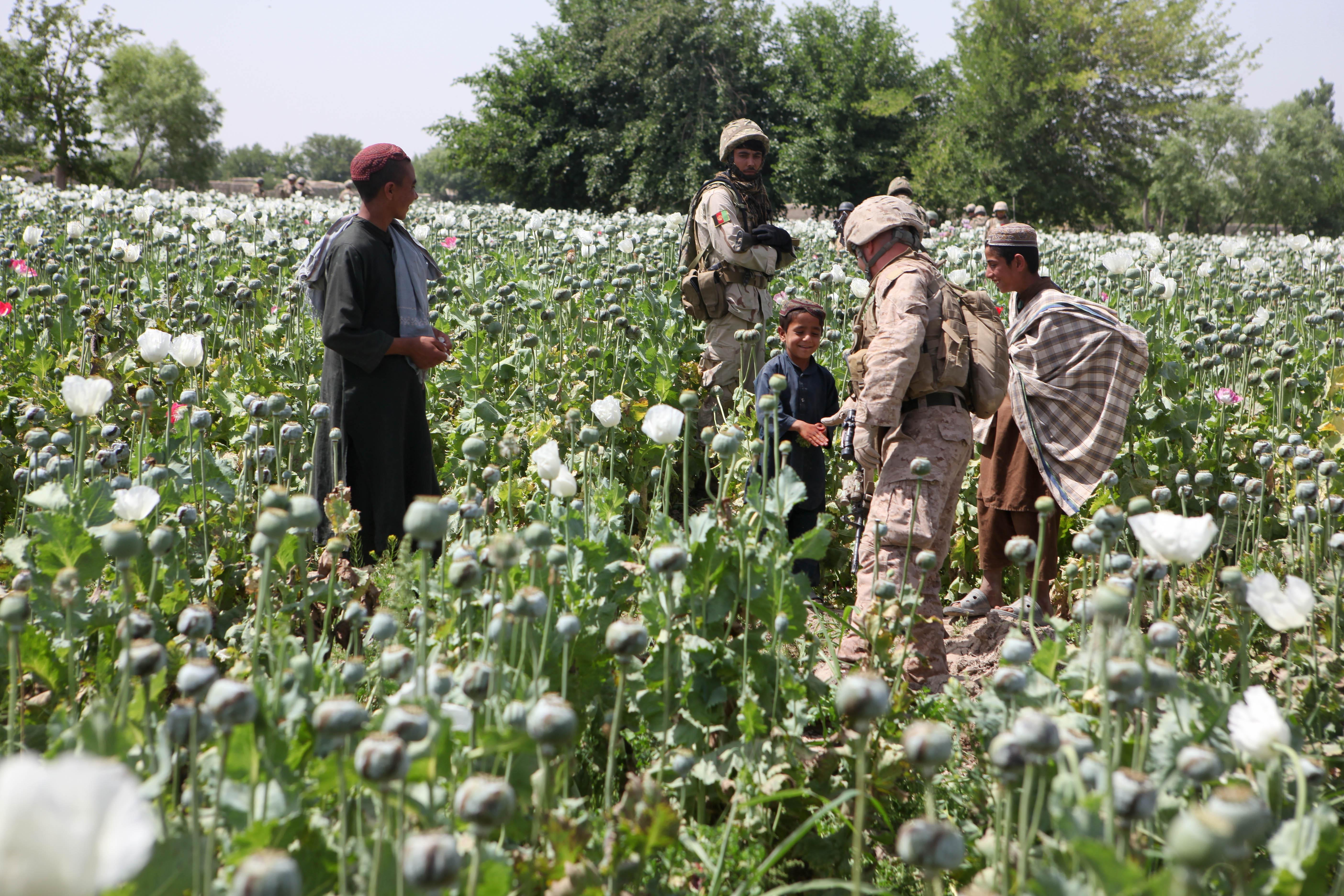
Governments of opium-producing Parties are required to "purchase and take physical possession of such crops as soon as possible" after harvest to prevent diversion into the illicit market.

A Senate of Canada committee reported: "The work of consolidating the existing international drug control treaties into one instrument began in 1948, but it was 1961 before an acceptable third draft was ready." That year, the UN Economic and Social Council convened a plenipotentiary conference of 73 nations for the adoption of a single convention on narcotic drugs. That meeting was known as the United Nations Conference on Narcotic Drugs. The participating states organized themselves into five distinct caucuses:

- Organic states group: As producers of the organic raw materials for most of the global drug supply, these countries had been the traditional focus of international drug control efforts. They were open to socio-cultural drug use, having lived with it for centuries or rather millennia. While India, Turkey, Pakistan and Burma took the lead, the group also included the coca-producing states of Indonesia and the Andean region of South America, the opium- and cannabis-producing countries of South and Southeast Asia, and the cannabis-producing states in the Horn of Africa. They favored weak controls because existing restrictions on production and export had directly affected large segments of their domestic population and industry. They supported national control efforts based on local conditions and were wary of strong international control bodies under the UN. Essentially powerless to fight the prohibition philosophy directly, they could only force a compromise by working together to dilute the treaty language with exceptions, loopholes and deferrals. They also sought development aid to compensate for losses caused by strict controls.
- Manufacturing states group: This group included primarily Western industrialized nations, the key players being the United States, the United Kingdom, Canada, Switzerland, the Netherlands, West Germany, and Japan. Having no cultural affinity for organic drug use and being faced with the effects that drug abuse was having on their citizens, they advocated stringent controls on the production of organic raw materials and on illicit trafficking. As the principal manufacturers of synthetic psychotropics, and backed by a determined industry lobby, they forcefully opposed undue restrictions on medical research or the production and distribution of manufactured drugs. They favored strong supranational control bodies as long as they continued to exercise de facto control over such bodies. According to W.B. McAllister's Drug Diplomacy in the Twentieth Century, their strategy was essentially to "shift as much of the regulatory burden as possible to the raw-material-producing states while retaining as much of their own freedom as possible."
- Strict control group: These were essentially non-producing and non-manufacturing states with no direct economic stake in the drug trade. The key members were France, Sweden, Brazil, and the Republic of China. Most of the states in this group were culturally opposed to drug use and suffered from abuse problems. They favored restricting drug use to medical and scientific purposes and were willing to sacrifice a degree of national sovereignty to ensure the effectiveness of supranational control bodies. They were forced to moderate their demands to secure the widest possible agreement.
- Weak control group: This group was led by the Soviet Union and often included its allies in Europe, Asia and Africa. They considered drug control a purely internal issue and adamantly opposed any intrusion on national sovereignty, such as independent inspections. With little interest in the drug trade and minimal domestic abuse problems, they refused to give excessive power to any supranational body, especially over internal decision-making.
- Neutral group: This was a diverse group including most of the African countries, Central America, sub-Andean South America, Luxembourg and the Vatican. They had no strong interest in the issue apart from ensuring their own access to sufficient drug supplies. Some voted with political blocs, others were willing to trade votes, and others were truly neutral and could go either way on the control issue depending on the persuasive power of the arguments presented. In general, they supported compromise with a view to obtaining the broadest possible agreement.

These competing interests, after more than eight weeks of negotiations, finally produced a compromise treaty. Several controls were weakened; for instance, the proposed mandatory embargoes on nations failing to comply with the treaty became recommendations. The 1953 New York Opium Protocol, which had not yet entered into force, limited opium production to seven countries; the Single Convention lifted that restriction, but instituted other regulations and put the International Narcotics Control Board in charge of monitoring their enforcement. A compromise was also struck that allowed heroin and some other drugs classified as particularly dangerous to escape absolute prohibition.

The Single Convention created four Schedules of controlled substances and a process for adding new substances to the Schedules without amending the treaty. The Schedules were designed to have significantly stricter regulations than the two drug "Groups" established by predecessor treaties. For the first time, cannabis was added to the list of internationally controlled drugs. In fact, regulations on the cannabis plant – as well as the opium poppy, the coca bush, poppy straw and cannabis tops – were embedded in the text of the treaty, making it impossible to deregulate them through the normal Scheduling process. A 1962 issue of the Commission on Narcotic Drugs' Bulletin on Narcotics proudly announced that "after a definite transitional period, all non-medical use of narcotic drugs, such as opium smoking, opium eating, consumption of cannabis (hashish, marijuana) and chewing of coca leaves, will be outlawed everywhere. This is a goal which workers in international narcotics control all over the world have striven to achieve for half a century."

A 3 August 1962, Economic and Social Council resolution ordered the publication of the Commentary on the Single Convention on Narcotic Drugs. The legal commentary was written by the United Nations Secretary-General staff member Adolf Lande, the former Secretary of the Permanent Central Narcotics Board and Drug Supervisory Body, operating under a mandate to give "an interpretation of the provisions of the Convention in the light of the relevant conference proceedings and other material." The Commentary contains the Single Convention's legislative history and can be a valuable aid to interpreting the treaty, when used alongside contemporaneous sources such as the Official Records.

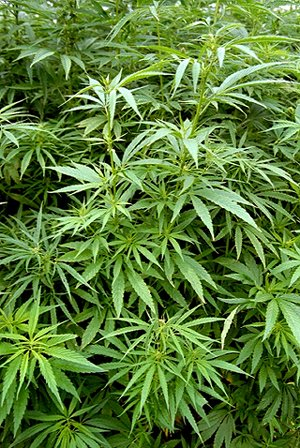
The Single Convention was the first international treaty to establish a narrow system of drug control for cannabis.

The Single Convention entered into force on 13 December 1964, having met Article 41's requirement of 40 ratifications. As of 1 January 2005, 180 states were Parties to the treaty. Others, such as Cambodia, have committed to becoming Parties.

On 21 May 1971, the UN Economic and Social Council called a conference of plenipotentiaries to consider amendments to the Single Convention. The conference met at the United Nations Office at Geneva from 6 to 24 March 1972, producing the 1972 Protocol Amending the Single Convention on Narcotic Drugs. The amendments entered into force on 8 August 1975.

On 11 November 1990, mechanisms for enforcing the Single Convention were expanded significantly by the entry into force of the United Nations Convention Against Illicit Traffic in Narcotic Drugs and Psychotropic Substances, which had been signed at Vienna on 20 December 1988. The Preamble to this treaty acknowledges the inadequacy of the Single Convention's controls to stop "steadily increasing inroads into various social groups made by illicit traffic in narcotic drugs and psychotropic substances". The new treaty focuses on stopping organized crime by providing for international cooperation in apprehending and convicting gangsters and starving them of funds through forfeiture, asset freezing, and other methods. It also establishes a system for placing precursors to Scheduled drugs under international control. Some non-Parties to the Single Convention, such as Andorra, belong to this treaty and thus are still under the international drug control regime.

== Provisions ==
=== Purposes ===
==== Medical and scientific purposes ====
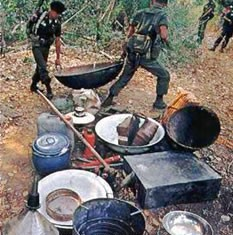
Under Article 37, "Any drugs, substances and equipment used in or intended for the commission of any of the offenses ... shall be liable to seizure and confiscation."

The Single Convention repeatedly affirms the importance of medical use of controlled substances. The Preamble notes that "the medical use of narcotic drugs continues to be indispensable for the relief of pain and suffering and that adequate provision must be made to ensure the availability of narcotic drugs for such purposes". Articles 1, 2, 4, 9, 12, 19, and 49 contain provisions relating to "medical and scientific" use of controlled substances. In almost all cases, parties are permitted to allow dispensation and use of controlled substances under a prescription, subject to record-keeping requirements and other restrictions.

The Single Convention unambiguously condemns "abuse of drugs", even stating that "addiction to narcotic drugs constitutes a serious evil for the individual and is fraught with social and economic danger to mankind". It aims to limit the global production of controlled drugs to an amount adequate to satisfy the estimated global demand for medical and scientific purposes without producing a surplus that could lead to diversion and addiction. Article 4 requires nations to take legislative and administrative measures necessary to limit production, trade, use and possession of drugs to medical and scientific purposes. Article 49 allowed countries to temporarily permit coca leaf chewing, opium smoking, and other traditional drug uses at the time of signature, ratification, or accession, but provides that countries opting to do so would be required to phase out these and other traditional uses by specific dates after the convention came into force.

As of 2025, 138 substances are controlled under the Single Convention.

==== Non-medical and non-scientific purposes ====
The Single Convention contains specific exemptions for drugs used for non-medical and non-scientific purposes. The broadest is article 2 paragraph 9 of the Single Convention, which permits a country to unilaterally exempt a drug that is commonly used in industry from nearly all control requirements of the convention, provided that the country ensures by appropriate means that the drug is not liable to be abused or have ill effects, and that the country include the quantity of the drug exempted under this article in its annual statistical submissions.

Other non-medical purposes that convention does not require the Parties to prohibit include the manufacture of substances not covered by the convention, the use of coca leaf as a flavoring agent, and the cultivation of the cannabis plant for industrial purposes.

Some analysts suggest the "recreational use" of drugs is part of the "other than medical and scientific purposes," and therefore exempt from the measure of control of the convention, which are limited to "medical and scientific purposes;" others analysts have, however, suggested that "other than medical and scientific purposes" does not encompass recreational use.

Malta seem to have followed article 2(9), which allows to regulate the use of drugs, other than medical and scientific, in the context of industry.

=== Penal provisions ===
As scholars note: "although formally binding, the penal provisions prove remarkably soft" and, as explained in the Commentary on the Single Convention, they are "rather vague, and [admit] escape clauses for the benefit of those Governments to which even such vague norms would be unacceptable."

Article 36 requires Parties to adopt measures against "cultivation, production, manufacture, extraction, preparation, possession, offering, offering for sale, distribution, purchase, sale, delivery on any terms whatsoever, brokerage, dispatch, dispatch in transit, transport, importation and exportation of drugs contrary to the provisions of this Convention," as well as "[i]ntentional participation in, conspiracy to commit and attempts to commit, any of such offences, and preparatory acts and financial operations in connexion with the offences referred to in this article", but it does not directly require criminalization of all the above; it states only in the cases of (unspecified) serious offences that they "shall be liable to adequate punishment particularly by imprisonment or other penalties of deprivation of liberty."

The Article also provides for extradition of drug offenders, although a Party has a right to refuse to extradite a suspect if "competent authorities consider that the offense is not sufficiently serious." A 1972 amendment to the Article grants nations the discretion to substitute "treatment, education, after-care, rehabilitation and social reintegration" for criminal penalties if the offender is a drug abuser. The Single Convention requires Parties to enact criminal laws for illicit drug-related activities, but does not clearly mandate their uniform enforcement.

Drug enforcement varies widely between nations. Many European countries, including the United Kingdom, Germany, and, most famously, the Netherlands, do not prosecute all petty drug offenses. Dutch coffee shops are allowed to sell small amounts of cannabis to consumers. However, the Ministry of Health, Welfare and Sport's report, Drugs Policy in the Netherlands, notes that large-scale "[p]roduction and trafficking are dealt with severely under the criminal law, in accordance with the UN Single Convention. Each year the Public Prosecutions Department deals with an average of 10,000 cases involving infringements of the Opium Act." Some of the most severe penalties for drug trafficking are handed down in certain Asian countries, such as Malaysia, which mandate capital punishment for offenses involving amounts over a certain threshold. Singapore mandates the death penalty for trafficking in 15 g (half an ounce) of heroin, 30 g of cocaine or 500 g of cannabis. Most nations, such as France and the United States, find a middle ground, imposing a spectrum of sanctions ranging from probation to life imprisonment for drug offenses.

The Single Convention's penal provisions frequently begin with clauses such as "Subject to its constitutional limitations, each Party shall..." Thus, if a nation's constitution prohibited instituting the criminal penalties called for by the Single Convention, those provisions would not be binding on that country.

=== Possession for personal use ===
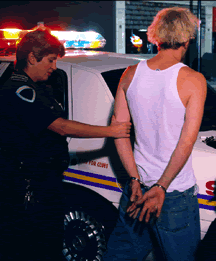
Different nations have drawn different conclusions as to whether the treaty requires criminalization of drug possession for personal use.

It is unclear whether or not the treaty requires criminalization of drug possession for personal use. The treaty's language is ambiguous, and a ruling by the International Court of Justice would probably be required to settle the matter decisively. However, several commissions have attempted to tackle the question. With the exception of the Le Dain Commission, most have found that states are allowed to legalize possession for personal use.

The Canadian Le Dain Commission of Inquiry into the Non-Medical Use of Drugs' 1972 report cites circumstantial evidence suggesting that states must prohibit possession for personal use:

It has generally been assumed that "possession" in Article 36 includes possession for use as well as possession for the purpose of trafficking. This is a reasonable inference from the terms of Article 4, which obliges the parties "to limit exclusively to medical and scientific purposes the production, manufacture, export, import, distribution of, trade in, use and possession of drugs". There is also Article 33, which provides that "The Parties shall not permit the possession of drugs except under legal authority." ... On the face of Article 26 it would not be unreasonable to argue that what is contemplated is possession for the purpose of trafficking rather than possession for use, and that the requirements of the article are satisfied if the former kind of possession is made a penal offense. The prevailing view, however, is that the word "possession" in Article 36 includes simple possession for use.

However, LeDain himself concludes

The costs to a significant number of individuals, the majority of whom are young people, and to society generally, of a policy of prohibition of simple possession are not justified by the potential for harm of cannabis and the additional influence which such a policy is likely to have upon perception of harm, demand and availability. We, therefore, recommend the repeal of the prohibition against the simple possession of cannabis.

The Canadian Department of National Health and Welfare's 1979 report, The Single Convention and Its Implications for Canadian Cannabis Policy, counters with circumstantial evidence to the contrary:

The substantive argument in support of simple possession falling outside the scope of Article 36 is founded on the assumption that it is intended to insure a penal response to the problem of illicit trafficking rather than to punish drug users who do not participate in the traffic. (See United Nations, 1973:112; Noll, 1977:44–45) The Third Draft of the Single Convention, which served as the working document for the 1961 Plenipotentiary Conference, contained a paragraph identical to that which now appears as Article 36, subparagraph 1(a). This paragraph was included in a chapter entitled Measures Against Illicit Traffickers, but the format by which the Third Draft was divided into chapters was not transferred to the Single Convention, and this, apparently, is the sole reason why this chapter heading, along with all others, was deleted. (See United Nations, 1973:112) Article 36 is still located in that part of the Convention concerned with the illicit trade, sandwiched between Article 35 (Action Against the Illicit Traffic) and Article 37 (Seizure and Confiscation). In addition...the word "use", suggesting personal consumption rather than trafficking, appears in conjunction with "possession" in Article 4 (which pertains to non-penal "general obligations"), but not in the penal provisions of Article 36.

The Sackville Commission of South Australia concluded in 1978 that:

the Convention does not require signatories to make either use or possession for personal use punishable offenses ... This is because 'use' is not specifically covered by Article 36 and the term 'possession' in that Article and elsewhere can be read as confined to possession for the purpose of dealing".

The American Shafer Commission reached a similar conclusion in 1972, finding "that the word 'possession' in Article 36 refers not to possession for personal use but to Possession as a link in illicit trafficking."

The Canadian Department of National Health and Welfare report cites the Commentary itself in backing up its interpretation:

The official Commentary on the Single Convention on Narcotic Drugs 1961, as prepared by the office of the U.N. Secretary-General, adopts a permissive interpretation of possession in Article 36. It notes that whether or not the possession of drugs (including prohibited forms of cannabis) for personal use requires the imposition of penal sanctions is a question which may be answered differently in different countries. Further, the Commentary notes that parties which interpret Article 36 as requiring a punitive legal response to simple possession, may undoubtedly choose not to provide for imprisonment of persons found in such possession, but to impose only minor penalties such as fines or even censure (since possession of a small quantity of drugs for personal consumption may be held not to be a serious offense under article 36... and only a serious offense is liable to adequate punishment particularly by imprisonment or other penalties of deprivation of liberty).

The Bulletin on Narcotics attempted to tackle the question in 1977:

Since some confusion and misunderstanding had existed in the past and some instances still persist in respect of the legal position laid down in the international treaties concerning the relationship between penal sanctions and drug abuse, some clarifying remarks are called for. These were already offered at the XIth International Congress on Penal Law. 5 They were reiterated at the Fifth United Nations Congress on the Prevention of Crime and the Treatment of Offenders. 6 The international treaties in no way insist on harsh penal sanctions with regard to drug abuse, as is sometimes alleged by persons criticising the international drug control system; the treaties are much more subtle and flexible than sometimes interpreted.

First of all, Article 4 of the Single Convention contains the general obligations for Parties to this Convention to "take such legislative and administrative measures as may be necessary, subject to the provisions of this Convention, to limit exclusively to medical and scientific purposes the production, manufacture, export, import, distribution of, trade in, use and possession of drugs". From the contents of this provision it is clear that use of drugs and their possession for personal consumption has also to be limited by legislation and administrative measures exclusively to medical and scientific purposes. Consequently, "legalization" of drugs in the sense of making them freely available for non-medical and non-scientific purposes-as it is sometimes demanded by public mass media and even experts in discussions on the subject-is without any doubt excluded and unacceptable under the present international drug control system as established by the international treaties. The question, however, remains whether Parties are obliged by the international treaties to apply penal sanctions for unauthorized use and unauthorized possession of drugs for personal consumption. It is on this point that confusion still exists and clarification is needed.

It is a fact that "use" (or "personal consumption") is not enumerated amongst the punishable offences in accordance with paragraph 1 of Article 36 of the Single Convention. Although, as mentioned above, Parties are required to limit the use of drugs exclusively to medical and scientific purposes, the Single Convention does not require them to attain the goal by providing penal sanctions for unauthorized "use" or "personal consumption" of drugs.

Unauthorized "possession" of drugs is mentioned in paragraph 1 of Article 36, but from the context it is clear that, as stated in the Official Commentary by the Secretary-General of the United Nations, "possession" of drugs for personal consumption is not to be considered a "punishable offence" by a Party to the Single Convention. The whole international drug control system envisages in its penal provisions the illicit traffic in drugs; this also holds true for the 1972 Protocol Amending the Single Convention and for the 1971 Convention on Psychotropic Substances. As there is no obligation to provide penal sanctions for "use" in the sense of personal consumption and "possession" of drugs for personal consumption, any criticism levelled against the international drug control system by protagonists in favour of the so-called "liberalization" or decriminalization or "de-penalization" of use and possession of drugs for personal consumption is quite beside the point.

=== Regulation of cannabis and hemp cultivation ===
The Single Convention places generally the same restrictions on cannabis cultivation that it does on opium cultivation, although there are cannabis-specific dispositions.

Article 23 and Article 28 require each Party to establish a government agency to control cultivation for medical and scientific purposes. Cultivators must deliver their total crop to the agency, which must purchase and take physical possession of them within four months after the end of harvest. The agency then has the exclusive right of "importing, exporting, wholesale trading and maintaining stocks other than those held by manufacturers."

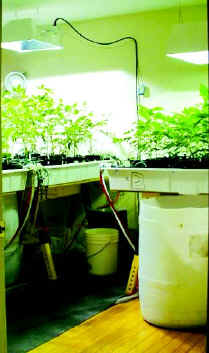
Articles 23 and 28 of the Single Convention on Narcotic Drugs require cannabis-producing nations to have a government agency that controls cultivation.

In the United States, the National Institute on Drug Abuse fulfills that function. NIDA administers a contract with the University of Mississippi to grow a 1.5 acre (6,000 m^{2}) crop of cannabis every other year; that supply comprises the only licit source of cannabis for medical and research purposes in the United States. Similarly, in 2000, Prairie Plant Systems was awarded a five-year contract to grow cannabis in the Flin Flon mine for Health Canada, that nation's licit cannabis cultivation authority. Article 28 specifically excludes the cultivation of industrial hemp from these regulations, stating:

"This Convention shall not apply to the cultivation of the cannabis plant exclusively for industrial purposes (fibre and seed) or horticultural purposes."

In addition, article 2(9) permits countries to exempt the cannabis tops and resin obtained from hemp grown for industrial purposes from many provisions of the convention.

Once on a path to reduction, there are now an increasing number of countries worldwide which are returning to hemp cultivation, often a traditional crop in various regions of the world, according to a report of the United Nations Conference on Trade and Development.

== Drugs and preparations under control ==
The treaty updated the Paris Convention of 13 July 1931, to include the vast number of synthetic opioids invented in the intervening 30 years and to add a mechanism for more easily including new ones. From 1931 to 1961, most of the families of synthetic opioids had been developed, including drugs related to methadone, pethidine (meperidine/Demerol), morphinans, and dextromoramide (Palfium, Palphium, Jetrium, Dimorlin, marketed solely in the Netherlands). Research on fentanyls and piritramide (R-3365, Pirium, Dipidolor, Piridolan, among others) was also nearing fruition at that point.

Earlier treaties had only controlled opium, coca, and derivatives such as morphine, heroin, and cocaine. The Single Convention, adopted in 1961, consolidated those treaties and broadened their scope to include cannabis and other substances with effects similar to drugs already covered. The Commission on Narcotic Drugs and the World Health Organization were empowered to add, remove, and transfer drugs among the treaty's four schedules of controlled substances. The International Narcotics Control Board was put in overall control of drug production, international trade, and dispensation. The United Nations Office on Drugs and Crime (UNODC) was delegated the Board's daily monitoring of each country and working with national authorities to ensure compliance with the Single Convention. This treaty has since been supplemented by the Convention on Psychotropic Substances, which controls LSD, MDMA, and other psychoactive pharmaceuticals, and the United Nations Convention Against Illicit Traffic in Narcotic Drugs and Psychotropic Substances, which strengthens provisions against money laundering and other drug-related offenses.

=== Schedules ===
The Single Convention's Schedules of drugs range from most restrictive to least restrictive, in this order: Schedule IV, Schedule I, Schedule II, Schedule III. The list of drugs initially controlled was annexed to the treaty. Article 3 states that for a drug to be placed in a Schedule, the World Health Organization must make the findings required for that Schedule, to wit:

- Schedule I – The substance is liable to similar abuse and productive of similar ill effects as the drugs already in Schedule I or Schedule II, or is convertible into a drug.
- Schedule II – The substance is liable to similar abuse and productive of similar ill effects as the drugs already in Schedule I or Schedule II, or is convertible into a drug.
- Schedule III – The preparation, because of the substances which it contains, is not liable to abuse and cannot produce ill effects; and the drug therein is not readily recoverable.
- Schedule IV – The drug, which is already in Schedule I, is particularly liable to abuse and to produce ill effects, and such liability is not offset by substantial therapeutic advantages.

==== Schedule I ====
According to the Commentary, is the category of drugs whose control provisions "constitute the standard regime under the Single Convention." The principal features of that regime are:

- Limitation to medical and scientific purposes of all phases of narcotics trade (manufacture, domestic trade, both wholesale and retail, and international trade) in, and of the possession and use of, drugs, except when these drugs are used in industry for other than medical and scientific purposes (article 2(9));
- Requirement of governmental authorization (licensing or state ownership) of participation in any phase of the narcotics trade and of a specific authorization (import and export authorization) of each individual international transaction;
- Obligation of all participants in the narcotics trade to keep detailed records of their transactions in drugs;
- Requirement of a medical prescription for the supply or dispensation of drugs to individuals;
- A system of limiting the quantities of drugs available, by manufacture or import or both, in each country and territory, to those needed for medical and scientific purposes.

List of drugs in Schedule I (not comprehensive)
- Cannabis (marijuana), cannabis resin, and extracts and tinctures of cannabis
- Coca leaf, cocaine and ecgonine:
  - coca leaves – the leaf of the coca bush (plant material), except a leaf from which all ecgonine, cocaine and any other ecgonine alkaloids have been removed
  - cocaine (methyl ester of benzoylecgonine) – an alkaloid found in coca leaves or prepared bionthesis from ecgonine
  - ecgonine, its esters and derivatives which are convertible to ecgonine and cocaine
- Natural opiates:
  - opium – the coagulated juice of the opium poppy, plant species Papaver somniferum L.
  - concentrate of poppy straw – the material arising when poppy straw (all parts of the opium poppy except the seeds, after mowing) has entered into a process for the concentration of its alkaloids when such material is made available in trade

Note on preparations: all preparations made direct from opium are considered to be opium (preparations), if the preparations are not made direct from opium itself but are obtained by a mixture of opium alkaloids (as is the case, for example, with pantopon, omnopon and papaveretum) they should be considered as morphine (preparations)

Natural opioids:

- oripavine
- morphine – the principal alkaloid of opium and of opium poppy
- thebaine – an alkaloid of opium; also found in Papaver bracteatum

Semisynthetic opioids:

- acetorphine
- benzylmorphine
- codoxime
- desomorphine
- dihydroetorphine
- dihydromorphine
- drotebanol
- etorphine
- heroin
- hydrocodone
- hydromorphinol
- hydromorphone
- methyldesorphine
- methyldihydromorphine
- metopon
- myrophine
- nicomorphine
- oxycodone
- oxymorphone
- thebacon

Some morphine derivatives, including some natural metabolites of morphine and codeine:

- morphine methobromide and other pentavalent nitrogen morphine derivatives, including in particular the genomorphine derivatives, one of which is genocodeine (codeine-N-oxide)
- genomorphine (morphine-N-oxide)
- normorphine

Synthetic opioids – morphinan derivatives:

- levomethorphan
- levophenacylmorphan
- levorphanol
- norlevorphanol
- phenomorphan
- racemethorphan
- racemorphan

Synthetic opioids – fentanyl and derivatives:

- acetyl-alpha-methylfentanyl
- alfentanil
- alpha-methylfentanyl
- alpha-methylthiofentanyl
- beta-hydroxyfentanyl
- beta-hydroxy-3-methylfentanyl
- fentanyl
- 3-methylfentanyl
- 3-methylthiofentanyl
- para-fluorofentanyl
- remifentanil
- sufentanil
- thiofentanyl

Synthetic 4-phenylpiperidine opioids – pethidines (meperidines):

- anileridine
- benzethidine
- difenoxin
- diphenoxylate
- etoxeridine
- furethidine
- hydroxypethidine
- morpheridine
- pethidine
- pethidine intermediate A
- norpethidine (pethidine intermediate B)
- pethidinic acid (pethidine intermediate C)
- phenoperidine
- piminodine
- properidine

Synthetic 4-phenylpiperidine opioids – prodines:

- allylprodine
- alphameprodine
- alphaprodine
- betameprodine
- betaprodine
- desmethylprodine (MPPP)
- PEPAP
- trimeperidine

Synthetic 4-phenylpiperidine opioids – ketobemidones:

- ketobemidone

Synthetic open chain opioids – amidones:

- dipipanone
- isomethadone
- methadone
- methadone intermediate (4-cyano-2-dimethylamino-4,4-diphenylbutane)
- normethadone
- norpipanone
- phenadoxone

Synthetic open chain opioids – methadols:

- acetylmethadol
- alphacetylmethadol
- alphamethadol
- betacetylmethadol
- betamethadol
- noracymethadol
- dimepheptanol

Synthetic open chain opioids – moramides:

- dextromoramide
- levomoramide (scheduled despite being inactive isomer)
- racemoramide
- moramide intermediate (2-methyl-3-morpholino-1,1-diphenylpropane carboxylic acid)

Synthetic open chain opioids – thiambutenes:

- diethylthiambutene
- dimethylthiambutene
- ethylmethylthiambutene

Synthetic open chain opioids – phenalkoxams:

- dimenoxadol
- dioxaphetyl butyrate

Synthetic open chain opioids – ampromides:

- diampromide
- phenampromide

Synthetic opioids – benzimidazoles:

- clonitazene
- etonitazene

Synthetic opioids – benzomorphans:

- metazocine
- phenazocine

Synthetic opioids – pirinitramides:

- bezitramide
- piritramide

Synthetic opioids – phenazepanes:

- proheptazine

Other synthetic opioids:

- tilidine

And:

- the isomers, unless specifically excepted, of the drugs in this Schedule whenever the existence of such isomers is possible within the specific chemical designation;
- the esters and ethers, unless appearing in another Schedule, of the drugs in this Schedule whenever the existence of such esters or ethers is possible;
- the salts of the drugs listed in this Schedule, including the salts of esters, ethers and isomers as provided above whenever the existence of such salts is possible.

Isomers specifically excluded (both synthetic non-opioids being morphinan derivatives):

- dextromethorphan
- dextrorphan

==== Schedule II ====
Drugs in Schedule II are regulated only slightly less strictly than Schedule I drugs. The Commentary confirms, "Drugs in Schedule II are subject to the same measures of control as drugs in Schedule I, with only a few exceptions":

- The drugs are not subject to the provisions of Article 30, paragraphs 2 and 5, as regards the retail trade.
- Governments are thus not bound to prevent the accumulation of drugs in Schedule II in the possession of retail distributors, in excess of the quantities required for the normal conduct of business.
- Medical prescriptions for the supply or dispensation of these drugs to individuals are not obligatory.
- Such drugs are also exempted from the provision – which in fact is no more than a suggestion – concerning the use of official prescription forms in the shape of counterfoil books issued by the competent governmental authorities or by authorized professional associations.
- Parties to the Single Convention need not require that the label under which a drug in Schedule II is offered for sale in the retail trade show the exact content by weight or percentage.

List of drugs in Schedule II (not comprehensive)

Natural opioids:

- codeine – alkaloid contained in opium and poppy straw

Semisynthetic opioids:

- acetyldihydrocodeine
- dihydrocodeine
- ethylmorphine
- nicocodine
- nicodicodine
- pholcodine

Natural codeine metabolite:

- norcodeine

Synthetic open chain opioids – phenalkoxams:

- dextropropoxyphene

Synthetic open chain opioids – ampromides:

- propiram

And:

- the isomers, unless specifically excepted, of the drugs in this schedule whenever the existence of such isomers is possible within the specific chemical designation;
- the salts of the drugs listed in this schedule, including the salts of the isomers as provided above whenever the existence of such salts is possible.

==== Schedule III ====
Schedule III "contains preparations which enjoy a privileged position under the Single Convention, i.e. are subject to a less strict regime than other Preparations", according to the Commentary. Specifically:

- Government authorizations are not required for each import or export of preparations in Schedule III. The import certificate and export authorization system laid down in Article 31, paragraphs 4 to 15, which governs the international transactions in drugs and their preparations, does not apply to the preparations in Schedule III.
- The only estimates and statistical returns that a Party need furnish to the INCB in reference to Schedule III preparations are estimates of the quantities of drugs to be used for the compounding of preparations in Schedule III, and information on the amounts of drugs actually so used.

List of preparations in Schedule III (not comprehensive)

Preparations of narcotic drugs exempted from some provisions:

- acetyldihydrocodeine,
- codeine,
- dihydrocodeine,
- ethylmorphine,
- nicocodine,
- nicodicodine,
- norcodeine,
- pholcodine (when compounded with one or more other ingredients and containing not more than 100 milligrams of the drug per dosage unit and with a concentration of not more than 2.5 per cent in undivided preparations)
- propiram (containing not more than 100 milligrams of propiram per dosage unit and compounded with at least the same amount of methylcellulose)
- dextropropoxyphene (for oral use containing not more than 135 milligrams of dextropropoxyphene base per dosage unit or with a concentration of not more than 2.5 per cent in undivided preparations, provided that such preparations do not contain any substance controlled under the 1971 Convention on Psychotropic Substances)
- cocaine (containing not more than 0.1 per cent of cocaine calculated as cocaine base)
- opium or morphine (containing not more than 0.2 per cent of morphine calculated as anhydrous morphine base and compounded with one or more other ingredients and in such a way that the drug cannot be recovered by readily applicable means or in a yield which would constitute a risk to public health)
- difenoxin (containing, per dosage unit, not more than 0.5 milligram of difenoxin and a quantity of atropine sulfate equivalent to at least 5 per cent of the dose of difenoxin)
- diphenoxylate (containing, per dosage unit, not more than 2.5 milligrams of diphenoxylate calculated as base and a quantity of atropine sulfate equivalent to at least 1 per cent of the dose of diphenoxylate)
- Pulvis ipecacuanhae et opii compositus (Dover's powder)
  - 10 per cent opium in powder;
  - 10 per cent ipecacuanha root (currently used to produce syrup of ipecac, an emetic), in powder well mixed with 80 per cent of any other powdered ingredient containing no drug.

Preparations conforming to any of the formulas listed in this Schedule and mixtures of such preparations with any material which contains no drug.

==== Schedule IV ====
This is the category of drugs, such as heroin, that are considered to have "particularly dangerous properties" in comparison to other drugs (ethanol is left unregulated).

According to Article 2, "The drugs in Schedule IV shall also be included in Schedule I and subject to all measures of control applicable to drugs in the latter Schedule" as well as whatever "special measures of control"; each Party deems necessary. This is in contrast to the U.S. Controlled Substances Act, which has five Schedules ranging from Schedule I (most restrictive) to Schedule V (least restrictive), and the Convention on Psychotropic Substances, which has four Schedules ranging for Schedule I (most restrictive) to Schedule IV (least restrictive).

Under certain circumstances, Parties are required to limit Schedule IV drugs to research purposes only:

(b) A Party shall, if in its opinion the prevailing conditions in its country render it the most appropriate means of protecting the public health and welfare, prohibit the production, manufacture, export and import of, trade in, possession or use of any such drug except for amounts which may be necessary for medical and scientific research only, including clinical trials therewith to be conducted under or subject to the direct supervision and control of the Party.

The Commentary explains two situations in which this provision would apply:

For a considerable period of time – and still at the time of writing – there has been no significant diversion of legally manufactured drugs from legal trade into illicit channels; but if a Government were unable to prevent such a diversion of drugs in Schedule IV, a situation would arise in which the measures of prohibition mentioned in subparagraph (b) would be "the most appropriate means of protecting the public health and welfare". Whether this was or was not the case would be left to the judgement of the Party concerned whose bona fide opinion on this matter could not be challenged by any other Party.

Another situation in which measures of prohibition would be "appropriate" for the protection of public health and welfare might exist where the members of the medical profession administered or prescribed drugs in Schedule IV in an unduly extensive way, and other less radical measures, such as warnings by public authorities, professional associations or manufacturers, were ineffective. It may however be assumed that such a situation could rarely if ever arise.

The Commentary notes that "Whether the prohibition of drugs in Schedule IV (cannabis and resin, desomorphine, heroin, ketobemidone) should be mandatory or only recommended was a controversial question at the Plenipotentiary Conference." The provision adopted represents "a compromise which leaves prohibition to the judgement, though theoretically not to the discretion, of each Party." The Parties are required to act in good faith in making this decision, or else they will be in violation of the treaty.

Cannabis and cannabis resin were present in Schedule IV from 1961 until 2 December 2020.

List of drugs in Schedule IV (not comprehensive)

Semisynthetic opioids:

- acetorphine
- desomorphine
- etorphine
- heroin

Synthetic opioids – fentanyl and derivatives:

- acetyl-alpha-methylfentanyl
- alpha-methylfentanyl
- alpha-methylthiofentanyl
- beta-hydroxyfentanyl
- beta-hydroxy-3-methylfentanyl
- 3-methylfentanyl
- 3-methylthiofentanyl
- para-fluorofentanyl
- thiofentanyl

Synthetic 4-phenylpiperidine opioids – prodines:

- desmethylprodine (MPPP)
- PEPAP

Synthetic 4-phenylpiperidine opioids – ketobemidones:

- ketobemidone

And the salts of the drugs listed in this schedule whenever the formation of such salts is possible.

=== Limitation of scope ===
The Single Convention allows only drugs with morphine-like, cocaine-like, and cannabis-like effects to be added to the Schedules. The strength of the drug is not relevant; only the similarity of its effects to the substances already controlled. For instance, etorphine and acetorphine were considered sufficiently morphine-like to fall under the treaty's scope, although they are many times more potent than morphine. However, according to the Commentary:

The Office of Legal Affairs of the United Nations ruled, in an opinion given to the Commission on Narcotic Drugs at its twenty-third session, that barbiturates, tranquillizers and amphetamines were outside the scope of the Single Convention. It pointed out that there was an understanding at all stages of the drafting of the Single Convention, in particular at the Plenipotentiary Conference of 1961 which adopted that treaty, that the Convention was not applicable to these three types of substances, although the effects of amphetamines have some degree of similarity to cocaine, and those of barbiturates and tranquillizers to morphine.

Since cannabis is a hallucinogen (although some dispute this), the Commentary speculates that mescaline, psilocybin, tetrahydrocannabinol, and LSD could have been considered sufficiently cannabis-like to be regulated under the Single Convention; however, it opines, "It appears that the fact that the potent hallucinogenics whose abuse has spread in recent years have not been brought under international narcotics control does not result from legal reasons, but rather from the view of Governments that a regime different from that offered by the Single Convention would be more adequate." That different regime was instituted by the 1971 Convention on Psychotropic Substances. The Convention on Psychotropic Drugs' scope can include any drug not already under international control if the World Health Organization finds that:

- The substance has the capacity to produce "[a] state of dependence" AND "[c]entral nervous system stimulation or depression, resulting in hallucinations or disturbances in motor function or thinking or behaviour or perception or mood"; or
- The substance has the capacity to produce similar abuse and similar ill effects as LSD or one of the other controlled substances enumerated in Convention; or
- There is sufficient evidence that the substance is being or is likely to be abused so as to constitute a public health and social problem warranting the placing of the substance under international control.

The reason for sharply limiting the scope of Single Convention to a few types of drugs while letting the Convention on Psychotropic Drugs cover the rest was concern for the interests of industry. Professor Cindy Fazey's The Mechanics and Dynamics of the UN System for International Drug Control explains, "concerted efforts by drug manufacturing nations and the pharmaceutical industry ensured that the controls on psychotropics in the 1971 treaty were considerably looser than those applied to organic drugs in the Single Convention."

A failed 24 March 2003 European Parliament committee report noted the disparity in how drugs are regulated under the two treaties:

The 1971 Convention, which closely resembles the Single Convention, establishes an international control which is clearly less rigorous for the so-called 'psychotropic' substances, generally produced by the pharmaceutical industry ... The parallel existence of the Single Convention and the 1971 Convention have led to certain illogical effects such as the fact that a plant (cannabis) containing at most 3% of a principal element is dealt with more severely than the pure substance at 100% (tetrahydrocannabinol or THC).

For this reason, the European Parliament, Transnational Radical Party, and other organizations have proposed removing cannabis and other drugs from the Single Convention and scheduling them under the Convention on Psychotropic Substances.

=== Rescheduling of cannabis ===
There has long been a controversy over whether cannabis is "particularly liable to abuse and to produce ill effects" and whether that "liability is not offset by substantial therapeutic advantages", as required by Schedule IV criteria. Already in 1973, the Commentary on the Single Convention edited by UN Secretary-General pointed out that "should the results of the intensive research which is at the time of this writing being undertaken on the effects of [cannabis and cannabis resin] so warrant, they could be deleted from Schedule IV, and these two drugs, as well as extracts and tinctures of cannabis, could be transferred from Schedule I to Schedule II." Since the discovery of the endocannabinoid receptor system in the late 1980s, which revolutionized the scientific understanding of the psychopharmacological effects of cannabis, and the important progresses in research related to the medical uses of the plant, questions as to the validity of the placement of cannabis and cannabis resin in Schedule IV increased.

In 1991, delta-9-THC was down-scheduled from Schedule I to Schedule II of the Convention on Psychotropic Substances of 1971. After numerous discussions at the World Health Organization in the 2000s and 2010s, on 2 December 2020, the Commission on Narcotic Drugs adopted Decision 63/17 withdrawing "cannabis and cannabis resin" from Schedule IV of the Single Convention. The vote was based on recommendations issued by the World Health Organization in 2019 on the basis of scientific evidence-based reviews. The decision entered into force in April 2021.

=== Drugs and substances scheduled in other treaties ===
Cannabinoids (natural and synthetic) and opioids (synthetic and semisynthetic) are scheduled by Convention on Psychotropic Substances.

Natural cannabinols (synthetic cannabinoids omitted):

- tetrahydrocannabinol, the following isomers and their stereochemical variants:
  - 7,8,9,10-tetrahydro-6,6,9-trimethyl-3-pentyl-6H-dibenzo[b,d]pyran-1-ol
  - (9R,10aR)-8,9,10,10a-tetrahydro-6,6,9-trimethyl-3-pentyl-6H-dibenzo[b,d]pyran-1-ol
  - (6aR,9R,10aR)-6a,9,10,10a-tetrahydro-6,6,9-trimethyl-3-pentyl-6H-dibenzo[b,d]pyran-1-ol
  - (6aR,10aR)-6a,7,10,10a-tetrahydro-6,6,9-trimethyl-3-pentyl-6H-dibenzo[b,d]pyran-1-ol
  - 6a,7,8,9-tetrahydro-6,6,9-trimethyl-3-pentyl-6H-dibenzo[b,d]pyran-1-ol
  - (6aR,10aR)-6a,7,8,9,10,10a-hexahydro-6,6-dimethyl-9-methylene-3-pentyl-6H-dibenzo[b,d]pyran-1-ol
- delta-9-tetrahydrocannabinol – (6aR,10aR)-6a,7,8,10a-tetrahydro-6,6,9-trimethyl-3-pentyl-6H-dibenzo[b,d]pyran-1-ol, and its stereochemical variants (dronabinol is the international non-proprietary name, although it refers to only one of the stereochemical variants of delta-9-tetrahydrocannabinol, namely (−)-trans-delta-9-tetrahydrocannabinol)

Semisynthetic agonist–antagonist opioids:

- buprenorphine

Synthetic agonist-antagonist opioids – benzomorphans:

- pentazocine

Synthetic open chain opioids having also stimulant effects:

- lefetamine

=== Opioids not scheduled ===
Some opioids currently or formerly used in medicine are not scheduled by UN conventions, for example:

- tramadol
- tapentadol
- nalbuphine (agonist-antagonist opioid)
- butorphanol (agonist-antagonist opioid)

There are of course many opioid designer drugs, not used in medicine.

=== See also ===
- List of UN-controlled psychotropic substances
- List of UN-controlled drug precursors

== Governance ==
The Single Convention gives the UN Economic and Social Council's Commission on Narcotic Drugs (CND) power to add or delete drugs from the Schedules, in accordance with the World Health Organization's findings and recommendations. Any Party to the treaty may request an amendment to the Schedules, or request a review of the commission's decision. The Economic and Social Council is the only body that has power to confirm, alter, or reverse the CND's scheduling decisions. The United Nations General Assembly can approve or modify any CND decision, except for scheduling decisions.

The CND's annual meeting serves as a forum for nations to debate drug policy. At the 2005 meeting, France, Germany, the Netherlands, Canada, Australia and Iran rallied in opposition to the UN's zero-tolerance approach in international drug policy. Their appeal was vetoed by the United States, while the United Kingdom delegation remained reticent. Meanwhile, U.S. Office of National Drug Control Policy Director John Walters clashed with United Nations Office on Drugs and Crime Executive Director Antonio Maria Costa on the issue of needle exchange programs. Walters advocated strict prohibition, while Costa opined, "We must not deny these addicts any genuine opportunities to remain HIV-negative."

The International Narcotics Control Board (INCB) is mandated by Article 9 of the Single Convention to "endeavour to limit the cultivation, production, manufacture and use of drugs to an adequate amount required for medical and scientific purposes, to ensure their availability for such purposes and to prevent illicit cultivation, production and manufacture of, and illicit trafficking in and use of, drugs." The INCB administers the estimate system, which limits each nation's annual production of controlled substances to the estimated amounts needed for medical and scientific purposes.

Article 21 provides that "the total of the quantities of each drug manufactured and imported by any country or territory in any one year shall not exceed the sum of" the quantity:

- Consumed, within the limit of the relevant estimate, for medical and scientific purposes;
- Used, within the limit of the relevant estimate, for the manufacture of other drugs, of preparations in Schedule Ill, and of substances not covered by this convention;
- Exported;
- Added to the stock for the purpose of bringing that stock up to the level specified in the relevant estimate; and
- Acquired within the limit of the relevant estimate for special purposes.

Article 21 bis, added to the treaty by a 1971 amendment, gives the INCB more enforcement power by allowing it to deduct from a nation's production quota of opium some or all of the amounts it determines have been produced within that nation and introduced into the illicit traffic. This could happen as a result of failing to control either illicit production or diversion of licitly produced opium to illicit purposes. In this way, the INCB can essentially punish a narcotics-exporting nation that does not control its illicit traffic by imposing an economic sanction on its medicinal narcotics industry.

The Single Convention exerts power even over those nations that have not ratified it. Under Article 12, the International Narcotics Board is mandated to request that governments of countries and territories to which the convention does not apply nevertheless furnish estimates of legitimate needs in accordance with the provisions of the convention. Should they fail to do so, the convention empowers the Board to establish its own estimates for those countries or territories, and the Parties to the convention are obligated to adhere to that estimate in their dealings with that country or territory. Regarding this authority, the International Narcotics Control Board has stated:

The fact that the system generally works well is mainly due to the estimates system that covers all countries whether or not parties to the Convention. Countries are under an obligation not to exceed the amounts of the estimates confirmed or established by the INCB.

Article 14 authorizes the INCB to recommend an embargo on imports and exports of drugs from any noncompliant nations. The INCB can also issue reports critical of noncompliant nations, and forward those reports to all Parties. This happened when the United Kingdom reclassified cannabis from Class B to class C, eliminating the threat of arrest for possession. See Cannabis reclassification in the United Kingdom.

The most controversial decisions of the INCB are those in which it assumes the power to interpret the Single Convention. Germany, the Netherlands, Switzerland, and Spain continue to experiment with medically supervised injection rooms, despite the INCB's objections that the Single Convention's allowance of "scientific purposes" is limited to clinical trials of pharmaceutical grade drugs and not public health interventions. These European nations have more leverage to disregard the Board's decisions because they are not dependent on licit psychoactive drug exports (which are regulated by the Board). As international lawyer Bill Bush notes, "Because of the Tasmanian opium poppy industry, Australia is more vulnerable to political pressure than, say, Germany."

The INCB is an outspoken opponent of drug legalization. Its 2002 report rejects a common argument for drug reform, stating, "Persons in favour of legalizing illicit drug use argue that drug abusers should not have their basic rights violated; however, it does not seem to have occurred to those persons that drug abusers themselves violate the basic rights of their own family members and society." The report dismisses concerns that drug control conflicts with principles of limited government and self-determination, arguing, "States have a moral and legal responsibility to protect drug abusers from further self-destruction." The report takes a majoritarian view of the situation, declaring, "Governments must respect the view of the majority of lawful citizens; and those citizens are against illicit drug use."

Article 48 designates the International Court of Justice as the arbiter of disputes about the interpretation or application of the Single Convention, if mediation, negotiation, and other forms of alternative dispute resolution fail.

== Related treaties ==
=== Previous treaties ===
The Single Convention was preceded by a series of other international legal instrument, that it terminated and replaced. Article 44 provided that the Single Convention's entry into force terminated several predecessor treaties, including:

- The First International Opium Convention, signed at The Hague on 23 January 1912;
- The Agreement concerning the Manufacture of, Internal Trade in and Use of Prepared Opium, signed at Geneva on 11 February 1925;
- The Second International Opium Convention, signed at Geneva on 19 February 1925;
- The Convention for Limiting the Manufacture and Regulating the Distribution of Narcotic Drugs, signed at Geneva on 13 July 1931;
- The Agreement for the Control of Opium Smoking in the Far East, signed at Bangkok on 27 November 1931;
- The Convention for the Suppression of the Illicit Traffic in Dangerous Drugs, signed at Geneva on 26 June 1936;
- The Protocol Amending the Agreements, Conventions and Protocols on Narcotic Drugs concluded at The Hague on 23 January 1912, at Geneva on 11 February 1925 and 19 February 1925, and 13 July 1931, at Bangkok on 27 November 1931 and at Geneva on 26 June 1936 (except as it affected the latter), signed at Lake Success on 11 December 1946;
- The Protocol Bringing under International Control Drugs outside the Scope of the Convention of 13 July 1931 for Limiting the Manufacture and Regulating the Distribution of Narcotic Drugs, signed at Paris on 19 November 1948; and
- The Protocol for Limiting and Regulating the Cultivation of the Poppy Plant, the Production of, International and Wholesale Trade in, and Use of Opium, signed at New York on 23 June 1953.

=== Complementary treaties on drug control ===
The Single Convention is supplemented by two other major drug control treaties:

- The Convention on Psychotropic Substances controls LSD, MDMA, and other drugs whose unique psychoactive effects exclude them from the scope of the Single Convention. It was signed at Vienna on 21 February 1971.
- The United Nations Convention Against Illicit Traffic in Narcotic Drugs and Psychotropic Substances adds additional enforcement mechanisms for fighting drug traffickers, including asset forfeiture provisions. The convention also establishes a system of drug precursor regulation, dividing them into two tables of listed chemicals. It was signed at Vienna on 20 December 1988.

=== Other treaties referring to the Single Convention ===
- United Nations Convention on the Law of the Sea,
- Convention on the Rights of the Child,
- Regional legal instruments, such as European Union regulations, sometimes refer to the Single Convention.

== See also ==
- Other international drug control treaties:
  - Convention on Psychotropic Substances (1971)
  - Convention Against Illicit Traffic in Narcotic Drugs and Psychotropic Substances (1988)
- Bodies mandated under the convention:
  - Commission on Narcotic Drugs (CND)
  - United Nations Office on Drugs and Crime (UNODC), on behalf of Secretary-General of the United Nations
  - International Narcotics Control Board (INCB)
  - World Health Organization (WHO)
- Specific issues:
  - Article 2 paragraph 9 of the Single Convention
  - Removal of cannabis and cannabis resin from Schedule IV of the Single Convention
  - Drug policy · of the Netherlands; of Portugal; of Sweden; of Canada; of the Soviet Union; of the United Kingdom
  - Opioid epidemic in the United States
  - Designer drug (New Psychoactive Substance, NPS)
  - Legal issues of cannabis
  - Medical marijuana
  - Prohibition (drugs)
  - Illegal drugs trade
  - War on drugs: Mexican drug war; Philippine drug war; Plan Colombia

== Notes ==
- 1962/914(XXXIV)D. The Single Convention on Narcotic Drugs, 1961: Preparations for the coming into force, UN Economic and Social Council, 3 August 1962.
- Alfons NOLL, LL.M.: Drug abuse and penal provisions of the international drug control treaties, Bulletin on Narcotics, 1977.
- Bayer, I. and Ghodse, H.: Evolution of International Drug Control, 1945–1995, United Nations Office on Drugs and Crime.
- Beeby, Dean: Health Canada considers abandoning highly potent marijuana strain, Canadian Press, 20 April 2003.
- Bush, Bill: An anniversary to regret: 40 years of failure of the Single Convention on Narcotic Drugs.
- Cannabis: Our Position for a Canadian Public Policy, Report of the Senate Special Committee on Illegal Drugs, Sep. 2002.
- Cappato, Marco and Perduca, Marco: Concept Paper for Campaign by the Transnational Radical Party and the International Antirohibitionist League to Reform the UN Conventions on Drugs, 9 October 2002.
- Commentary on the Single Convention on Narcotic Drugs.
- Controlled Substances Act – U.S. Drug Enforcement Administration.
- Controls Required by the Single Convention, NORML v. DEA, 559 F.2d 735 (D.C. Cir. 1977).
- Convention on Psychotropic Substances.
- Cowan, Richard: As More and More Countries Begin to Question Cannabis Prohibition, The Debate Should Be An International. Basic Rights Versus Toothless Treaties, 9 July 2001.
- Drugs policy in the Netherlands, Ministerie VWS.
- EMCDDA (2006), European Legal Map on Possession of cannabis for personal use
- Fazey, Cindy: A Growing Market: The Domestic Cultivation of Cannabis, National Addiction Centre, 2003.
- Fazey, Cindy: The Mechanics and Dynamics of the UN System for International Drug Control, 14 March 2003.
- Fazey, Cindy: The UN Conventions.
- Fazey, Cindy: The UN Drug Policies and the Prospect for Change, Apr. 2003.
- Interview with Dr. Philip O. Emafo, President of the International Narcotics Control Board (INCB), The Update, Dec. 2002.
- McAllister, William B. Drug diplomacy in the twentieth century: an international history, Routledge, 2000
- McLaughlin, Aideen: Drugs expert warns: cannabis as dangerous to society as heroin, 13 March 2005.
- Monthly Status of Treaty Adherence, 1 January 2005.
- Narcotic Drugs under International Control ("Yellow List") The chemical name and structure of each substance under the control of the Treaty. Correlates the drugs and substances controlled by the Treaty with those named in the Canadian Controlled Drugs and Substances Act, the UK Misuse of Drugs Act 1971 and the US Controlled Substances Act.
- The Plenipotentiary Conference for the adoption of a Single Convention on Narcotic Drugs, Bulletin on Narcotics, 8 May 2005.
- Provision of Marijuana and Other Compounds For Scientific Research – Recommendations of The National Institute on Drug Abuse National Advisory Council, National Advisory Council on Drug Abuse, National Institute on Drug Abuse, Jan. 1998.
- Report of the International Narcotics Control Board for 2002, E/INCB/2002/1.
- Riley, Diane: Drugs and Drug Policy in Canada: A Brief Review & Commentary, Nov. 1998.
- Road to Vienna: British Government Chides International Narcotics Control Board on Cannabis Rescheduling Critique, 28 March 2003.
- The Single Convention and Its Implications for Canadian Cannabis Policy, Cannabis Control Policy: A Discussion Paper, Health Protection Branch, Department of National Health and Welfare, Canada, Jan. 1979.
- Single Convention on Narcotic Drugs 1961, International Narcotics Control Board.
- Tan, Amy: Singapore death penalty shrouded in silence, Reuters, 12 April 2002.
- The Traffic in Narcotics: An interview with the Hon. Harry J. Anslinger United States Commissioner of Narcotics, 1 January 1954.
- United Nations Convention Against Illicit Traffic in Narcotic Drugs and Psychotropic Substances.
- United Nations Office on Drugs and Crime Legal Library.
- Urquhart, John: Hemp Cultivation Sows High Hopes in Canada, The Wall Street Journal, 24 April 1998.
- U.S. and U.N. drug policy directors butt heads over needle exchanges, Associated Press, 9 March 2005.
- Coca, Cocaine and the International Conventions, Transnational Institute TNI, April 2003
