= International drug control conventions =

Three international drug control treaties

The international drug control conventions, also known as the United Nations drug control conventions, are three related, non self-executing treaties that establish an international legal framework for drug control. They serve to maintain a classification system of controlled substances including psychoactive drugs and precursors, to ensure the regulated supply of those substances useful for medical and scientific purposes, and to prevent other uses. Ratification is near universal among UN member countries.

The treaties are the Single Convention on Narcotic Drugs (1961; amended in 1972), the Convention on Psychotropic Substances (1971), and the UN Convention Against Illicit Traffic in Narcotic Drugs and Psychotropic Substances (1988). There are also other minor treaties addressing drugs, such as the Convention on the Rights of the Child or the UN Convention on the Law of the Sea.

== Conventions ==
The three treaties are complementary and mutually supportive. They serve to maintain a classification system of controlled substances, including psychoactive drugs and plants, and chemical precursors, to ensure the regulated supply of those substances determined to be useful for medical and scientific purposes, and to otherwise prevent production, distribution and use, with some limited exceptions and exemptions. Adoption of the treaties is near universal among the UN's 193 member countries.

The treaties are not self-executing, they operate indirectly by providing a skeleton template of provisions that have to be fleshed out in the domestic law of each member country. Thus each country has a degree of flexibility in conforming treaty obligations to their own socio-cultural, political and economic realities; this latitude has been described as a "vast grey area ... subject to judicial interpretation and political contestation."

The cornerstone Single Convention on Narcotic Drugs (as amended in 1972) integrated into a single framework nine pre-existing international drug treaties dating back to 1912, and extended the control system, including to the cultivation of plants used for narcotic drugs. The subsequent two conventions addressed new developments and concerns; some 340 substances in total are listed across the three. For each of the conventions, an official Commentary provides comprehensive legal analysis to assist with interpretation.

=== Single Convention on Narcotic Drugs ===
The Single Convention on Narcotic Drugs, 1961 was adopted in 1961, entered into force on December 13, 1964, and, as amended by the 1972 Protocol; has been joined by 186 countries as of 2022. (Note: One state, Chad, remains party to the unamended convention.) According to the United Nations Office on Drugs and Crime (UNODC), the Single Convention aims to "combat drug abuse" by limiting "the possession, use, trade in, distribution, import, export, manufacture and production of drugs exclusively to medical and scientific purposes" and through "international cooperation to deter and discourage drug traffickers". The Single Convention classifies drugs in four schedules; Schedules I and IV are the most prohibitive (IV is a subset of I) and included opium, heroin, cocaine and cannabis (in 2020, cannabis was removed from the most restrictive Schedule IV).

=== Convention on Psychotropic Substances ===
The Convention on Psychotropic Substances was adopted in 1971, entered into force on August 16, 1976, has been joined by 184 countries. It addresses a number of synthetic psychotropic substances, such as amphetamines, barbiturates, and LSD, that had become widely used since World War II, and especially in the 1960s, and were generally not regulated internationally. According to the UNODC, the convention "responded to the diversification and expansion of the spectrum of drugs of abuse and introduced controls over a number of synthetic drugs according to their abuse potential on the one hand and their therapeutic value on the other". The convention classifies the drugs it concerns in a four-schedule system different in the details from the Single Convention schedules.

=== Convention Against Illicit Traffic in Narcotic Drugs and Psychotropic Substances ===
The United Nations Convention Against Illicit Traffic in Narcotic Drugs and Psychotropic Substances was adopted in 1988, entered into force on November 11, 1990, has been joined by 191 countries. The convention addressed concern over the rapid growth in international drug trafficking. According to the UNODC, it "provides comprehensive measures against drug trafficking, including provisions against money laundering and the diversion of precursor chemicals". The treaty essentially "criminalized the entire drug market chain, from cultivation/production to shipment, sale, and possession".

== Philosophy, origins, architects ==
The international drug conventions occurred within the newly formed United Nations, as the UN assumed the duties of the retired League of Nations after WWII. The preamble to the Single Convention establishes the overarching concern of the drug treaties as "the health and welfare of mankind". It recognizes "narcotic drugs" as "indispensable for the relief of pain and suffering" and that they "must be made [available] for such purposes". It also recognizes addiction to narcotics as "a serious evil for the individual and is fraught with social and economic danger to mankind" and that there is a duty of nations to "prevent and combat this evil".

The conventions offer a degree of interpretative flexibility within a framework of control through prohibition. Controlled substances used for medical and scientific purposes are regulated, while other uses are prohibited; "each of the treaties encourages – and often requires – that member countries put in place strong domestic penal provisions."

A report by the Library of Parliament for the government of Canada on the history of the conventions identifies four themes as critical influences on the nature of the treaties: prohibition, United States involvement, external influences, and the outsized impact of certain powerful individuals. Prohibition of illicit use, "as opposed to regulation", has been the central philosophy. The US has been "the key player in most multilateral negotiations" and the prohibitionist approach "derives largely from U.S. policy – the various forms, past and present, of the U.S. 'war on drugs'". Outside interests, including "racism, fear, economic interests, domestic and international politics, global trade, domestic protectionism, war, arms control initiatives, the Cold War, development aid, and various corporate agendas", significantly shaped the conventions. And certain individuals played an outsized role in forming the policies: "while in positions of power at opportune moments, their beliefs, morals, ambitions and single-minded determination enabled them to exert exceptional influence over the shape of the international drug control regime." The efforts of US drug control commissioner Harry Anslinger and his Canadian counterpart and policy ally, Charles Henry Ludovic Sharman, are particularly notable.

While many scholars view the drug conventions as a US-engineered prohibitionist regime, others offer more nuanced analyses. Among them, John Collins finds that, though "a plurality of the policy literature maintains this narrative, the historiography has since moved on." He suggests that the conventions emerged from complex multilateral negotiations, "a triangulation between various state interests and blocs." Sebastien Scheerer finds that global drug policy "rests on a highly coercive consensus masterminded by ... the United States", yet the US relied on "other governments' prejudices, plans and interests" in drug prohibition; America may have to "share the credit (and blame)" with other parties. James Windle notes that "prohibitions were enforced in Asian countries while the United States and Western Europe were routinely trading opium"; the "concept of prohibition being a distinctly American construct is, therefore, flawed". Collins concludes, "The United States was a key participant in the [International Drug Control System], albeit frequently an absent one, but hardly the sole force."

== Administrative structure ==
Four entities are given authority under the drug conventions: the Commission on Narcotic Drugs (CND), the UN Office on Drugs and Crime (UNODC), the International Narcotics Control Board (INCB), and the World Health Organization (WHO).

The 53-member CND, a subsidiary organ of the Economic and Social Council (ECOSOC), is the UN's main drug policy body, responsible for the drug classification schedules and policy guidance. Members are elected by ECOSOC, one of the six UN main organs. The CND also is the governing body of the UNODC, which advises governments on implementation of the conventions and produces an annual World Drug Report. UNODC's focus is mainly on security and law enforcement, rather than public health.

The INCB is an independent treaty body, mandated by the Single Convention, that monitors implementation of the conventions, oversees the legal drug supply, and maintains discussions with countries regarding compliance issues. Central to its function is an annual set of reports, submitted to ECOSOC through the CND, that overlook the global drug situation. The reporting identifies and predicts problem trends and suggests corrective actions. Technical reports list estimated national requirements, and production, manufacture, trade and consumption data, for controlled drugs for medical and scientific use, gathered from individual countries. Trends in trafficking in precursors and essential chemicals for illicit drug manufacture, and evaluation of government measures taken to prevent that traffic, are also reported.

The WHO is responsible for providing the CND with the scientific evidence and recommendations used in determining drug scheduling and evaluating proposed treaty amendments. This work is carried out by the WHO Expert Committee on Drug Dependence (ECDD), a chosen group of independent experts within the field of pharmacology. The ECDD evaluates drugs for potential for harm including addiction, and for possible medical value.

== Obligations and enforcement ==
The conventions are legally binding, effectively under the Vienna Convention on the Law of Treaties (VCLT). (Note: The VCLT, effective 1980, is not retroactive, however, many of its provisions are accepted as reflecting customary international law, which can apply to previously existing treaties. "When questions of treaty law arise during negotiations or litigation, whether concerning a new treaty or one concluded before the entry into force of the VCLT, the rules set forth in the VCLT are invariably relied upon by the States concerned, or the international or national court or tribunal, even when the States concerned are not parties to the VCLT.") The INCB, charged with monitoring treaty compliance, relies primarily on direct discussion with individual countries to address non-compliance issues. Formal drug treaty disagreements between countries over issues such as treaty compliance and amendment, import-export, jurisdiction, and extradition, are addressed in dispute provisions in each of the conventions that call for remedies including negotiation, mediation, arbitration, judicial proceedings, or other "peaceful means", or turning to the International Court of Justice. Periodically, the UN General Assembly holds special session meetings on drugs that provide a normative framework for the drug conventions.

Falling out of compliance with the conventions, apart from denunciation by the UN and other countries, could have practical consequences, particularly for developing nations. The conventions regulate trade in legal pharmaceuticals, including the WHO list of essential drugs—leaving the system could make securing medicine more difficult. Being party to the three conventions is also a requirement for certain trade agreements, and for access to the European Union (EU).

Enforcement measures rely largely on dialog and diplomacy. The INCB, in addition to discussion, can call out perceived non-compliance in its reports and in public statements – "naming and shaming" – and by alerting the CND and ECOSOC. Beyond that, it has no practical enforcement power. The US has used its dominant power to enforce the conventions in other countries, in ways that include making financial aid contingent on drug control efforts, and supplying economic and military support for drug intervention.

The drug conventions do not explicitly prohibit, they establish control over a set of drugs. The personal use of illicit drugs is not outlawed, although possession is. Penalties are not specified, they are at the discretion of individual countries, and can range from mild to harsh. In practice, this flexibility has been used to create a prohibitionist, punitive war on drugs that is not explicitly required by the treaties. Negative effects of this hardline approach – increased violence and organized crime; human rights violations – have led to an increasing number of countries deviating from the regime. Deviation undermines the credibility of the drug conventions, which in turn, can weaken the entire system of UN international treaties.

=== Limitations and exemptions ===
There are limited exceptions and exemptions. For instance, the Single Convention provides exceptions to the central "exclusively to medical and scientific purposes" rule, such as for the cultivation of industrial hemp, the use of the coca leaf as a flavoring agent, and a general exemption in article 2(9) of any drug used for "other than medical and scientific purposes" (a phrase with conflicting interpretations). Countries can also join the treaties with specific national reservations.

== Compliance and deviation ==
In international law, it is said that "treaty interpretation is an art, not a science" Expanding that view, Philip Allott states that "interpretation in International Law is an art and a game and a field of battle." While the drug conventions define clear limitations, and the VCLT serves as a critical interpretive tool, there is "a degree of latitude for policy choices at the national and subnational level" that has allowed for ample interpretive divergence.

One study examining interpretive latitude in the conventions proposed three categories of deviation by member countries: permissible policies deviate while being generally accepted, contested policies are vigorously defended as in fact being within the guidelines, and impermissible policies are clear breaches of the conventions.

In recent decades, a growing number of countries, and a majority of states in the US, have moved towards drug liberalization by variously decriminalizing cannabis and other drugs for personal consumption, and by legalizing cannabis for recreational use. This has resulted in a variety of interpretations of, and tension with, the drug treaties.

=== Decriminalization and personal use ===
In 1976, the Netherlands' policy of tolerance of limited cannabis sale and personal use came into practice. The Dutch government amended the country's Opium Act to consider cannabis as a "soft drug" and permitted gedoogbeleid (Dutch: "tolerance policy"). Trafficking and possession of cannabis remained illegal; cannabis laws were not enforced for sale of small quantities for on-site use in coffeeshops. The INCB criticism of the Dutch system has been ongoing. One annual report called it "an activity that might be described as indirect incitement. This is not in accordance with the spirit or the letter of the international drug control treaties."

In 2001, Portugal decriminalized purchase and possession for personal use of all psychoactive drugs. It maintained its treaty obligations by changing the form of prohibition from criminal law to administrative law, replacing criminal penalties with fines, reporting requirements, and treatment referrals; drugs still had to be obtained from illegal sources, as selling remained a criminal act. Initially taking a negative view, the INCB in 2005 accepted the policy as legitimate, finding that "the practice of exempting small quantities of drugs from criminal prosecution is consistent with the international drug control treaties".

Some two dozen countries have taken similar approaches to decriminalizing cannabis and other drugs for personal consumption. For instance, in Mexico in 2009, "personal use" quantities were established for a number of drugs – cannabis (5 g), cocaine (0.5 g), heroin (50 mg), methamphetamine (40 mg), LSD (0.015 mg) – possession of which would result in a referral for treatment. A 2023 briefing to the European Parliament noted: "The UN bodies monitoring compliance with the conventions seem to have come to accept these policy choices" of tolerance or administrative rather than criminal penalties.

=== Legalization and regulated markets ===
Over 50 countries and the large majority of US states have legalized cannabis for medical use. In 2020, the CND acted on a recommendation from the WHO's ECDD by removing cannabis from the Single Convention's most restrictive Schedule IV category and recognized its medical value, while retaining it in the next most restrictive Schedule I. Addressing recreational use, the INCB in 2023 stated that "legalizing the non-medical use of cannabis ... contravenes the 1961 Single Convention on Narcotic Drugs" and that "the effects of cannabis use on individuals and societies should be studied further before Governments make long-term binding decisions", reminding governments that "the drug control conventions offer significant flexibility" for finding alternative solutions than legalization.

In 2012, two US states, Colorado (Amendment 64) and Washington (Initiative 502), legalized cannabis by direct vote through ballot initiatives. The INCB had warned, "Implementing the decisions of popular votes held in the United States in Colorado and Washington to allow for the recreational use of cannabis would be a violation of international laws." In August 2013, the federal government announced it would not act against states opening cannabis stores, with the expectation that state regulations would be "tough in practice, not just on paper, and include strong, state-based enforcement efforts, backed by adequate funding." The UN did not propose sanctions against the US, in particular since there exists no applicable sanction for the UN to apply. In 2022, the INCB said, regarding state legalization, “The Board has repeatedly expressed its concern that these developments may be inconsistent with the country’s legal obligations as a party to the three international drug conventions." Since then, over 20 other US states have legalized non-medical cannabis use.

In 2013, Uruguay legalized cannabis, with the law taking effect in April 2014, making it the first country to do so. The INCB condemned the move and stated that Uruguay "knowingly decided to break the universally agreed and internationally endorsed legal provisions". The statement continued: "Cannabis is not only addictive but may also affect some fundamental brain functions, IQ potential, and academic and job performance and impair driving skills. Smoking cannabis is more carcinogenic than smoking tobacco."

In 2018, Canada legalized cannabis, with the law taking effect that October. In "A Framework for the Legalization and Regulation of Cannabis in Canada", it was acknowledged that "Canada is one of more than 185 Parties to three United Nations drug control conventions" and said: "... it is our view that Canada's proposal to legalize cannabis shares the objectives agreed to by member states in multilateral declarations", citing protection of vulnerable citizens, evidence-based policy, and public health, safety and welfare as "the heart of a balanced approach to treaty implementation." The CND and INCB stated, "this decision contravenes the provisions of the drug control conventions, and undermines the international legal drug control framework and respect for the rules-based international order."

In Mexico, the Supreme Court in 2018 overturned as unconstitutional the prohibition of recreational cannabis use and ordered the government to enact corresponding legislation. In 2021, the Mexican Congress had still failed to change the laws, and the Court legalized personal use of cannabis. However, without updated legislation, the situation remains murky. Individuals have to apply for a permit and the federal criminal code with respect to recreational use has not been changed. The INCB, in its 2022 "Analysis of the world situation", reported, "In Mexico, legislative and policy changes concerning cannabis use for non-medical purposes continue to be in flux."

In 2021, Malta legalized cannabis, the first EU country to do so. It adopted a law echoing article 2(9) of the Single Convention (exemption for the use of drugs for industrial purposes), leading some scholars to consider it the first national legalization to achieve compliance with the drug control treaties.

==== Impact of the banking sector ====
The US banking industry has created pressure on both domestic and foreign cannabis legalization. While the US has allowed state-level legalization, cannabis remains a federally prohibited drug, keeping the US broadly in compliance with the international drug treaties. Thus, federally regulated banks in the US are reluctant to engage with cannabis-related businesses. In the US, this has largely prevented access to bank accounts, credit card processing, and loans by cannabis businesses operating legally at the state level. The situation is similar in Canada, where all five major national banks have a significant presence in the US. The US Patriot Act, which prohibits US banks from doing business with distributors of "controlled substances" such as cannabis, adds further complication: after legalization in Uruguay, US banks threatened to sever ties with Uruguayan banks that were dealing with cannabis suppliers.

=== Reservations by individual countries ===
When joining any of the three drug treaties, a country has the option to make reservations in order to modify or exclude specific treaty provisions for that country.

In joining the 1971 Convention on Psychotropic Substances, the US filed a reservation excepting "peyote harvested and distributed for use by the Native American Church in its religious rites"; the American Drug Enforcement Administration (DEA) made a corresponding exemption to the US Controlled Substances Act.

In January 2012, Bolivia withdrew from the Single Convention over the indigenous use of the coca leaf. It soon re-applied to the convention with a reservation allowing traditional use of coca; the re-accession came into force in February 2013. Blocking the reservation required objection by 61 countries, one-third of the, at the time, 183 parties to the convention; 15 countries objected by the deadline. The UNODC said it would "continue to work in Bolivia in accordance with its mandates to support the national system of drug control and the country's international cooperation in these matters."

=== Human rights ===
The drug conventions have been criticized for contributing to violations of the human rights principles enshrined in the Universal Declaration of Human Rights. Some scholars have also pointed at a violations of a number of international human right provisions contained in instruments such as the International Covenant on Civil and Political Rights, International Covenant on Economic, Social and Cultural Rights, International Convention on the Elimination of All Forms of Racial Discrimination, among others.

=== Criminal justice and "harsh" penalties ===
As of 2023, 35 countries have the death penalty for drug offenses; of those, the 33 UN full member countries are parties to the UN drug conventions. Nine of those countries – China, Indonesia, Iran, Kuwait, Malaysia, North Korea, Saudi Arabia, Singapore, Vietnam – are considered "high application" countries that regularly perform drug crime executions. The conventions encourage criminal penalties but do not provide guidelines for what is appropriate, which can be "an invitation to governments to enact abusive laws and policies, especially in a global context where drugs and drug trafficking are defined as an existential threat to society and the stability of nations".

== Modification and reform ==
Despite an increasing number of countries deviating from the conventions, particularly in the area of cannabis legalization, the prospect of fundamental amendment of the treaties seems distant at best, as the parties are roughly split between those who favor reform and those who adamantly back the existing prohibitionist regime. Provisions for treaty revision in the conventions allow changes to be easily blocked by states supporting a more prohibitive approach. The 1972 Protocol amending the Single Convention marked the only successful attempt to modify the drug conventions to date.

Apart from formal amendment, there other the options. Countries can of withdraw entirely, or withdraw and re-accede with a reservation, as in the case of Bolivia's coca leaf exception. Another option is inter se treaty modification, provided for in the VCLT, (Note: Before VCLT Article 41, there were no standardized rules for inter se modification, but certain practices could still be considered customary international law if they were widely accepted and followed by states: "only arid formalism would insist that a rule such as that contained in article 41 was not a 'rule of international law'.") where two or more countries create a sub-treaty framework and modify certain convention provisions, such as for cannabis, to their needs; additional countries could accede at later dates. A 2023 policy paper on treaty-compliant approaches to cannabis regulation within the EU explored 11 potential options under a variety of scenarios. (Note: In the European Union, it has been argued that the inter se amendment may not be possible under the current Treaty of Lisbon (Article 20 TEU and Articles 326 to 334 TFEU) which "deleted previously-existing provisions facilitating inter se between EU Member States")

=== UNGASS guidance ===
Three Special Session of the United Nations General Assembly (UNGASS) sessions have been held on the subject of drugs: "Drug abuse" (1990), "World drug problem" (1998), and "World drug problem" (2016). These high-level gatherings, involving heads of state and ministers, are documented usually in the form of a political declaration, an action plan, or a strategy that provide additional treaty guidance. These sessions can indicate whether the status quo will be maintained or if there is a broad openness to reform.

In March 2016, the INCB stated that the UN drug treaties do not mandate a "war on drugs" and that the choice is not between "'militarized' drug law enforcement on one hand and the legalization of non-medical use of drugs on the other", health and welfare should be the focus of drug policy. That April, at the UNGASS on the "World drug problem", the Wall Street Journal assessed the attendees' positions as "somewhat" in two camps: "Some European and South American countries as well as the U.S. favored softer approaches. Eastern countries such as China and Russia and most Muslim nations like Iran, Indonesia and Pakistan remained staunchly opposed." The outcome document recommended treatment, prevention and other public health measures, and committed to "intensifying our efforts to prevent and counter" drug production and trafficking, through, "inter alia, more effective drug-related crime prevention and law enforcement measures." A statement signed by 189 civil society organizations criticized the 2016 outcome document, itemizing the lack of progress and calling out the "highly problematic, non-inclusive and non-transparent" process that made it possible for "a handful of vocal and regressive countries [to] block progressive language", resulting in "an expensive restatement of previous agreements and conventions".
