= C21H28N2OS =

The molecular formula C_{21}H_{28}N_{2}OS (molar mass: 356.52 g/mol, exact mass: 356.1922 u) may refer to:

- α-Methylthiofentanyl
- 3-Methylthiofentanyl
