= Chloromorphide =

Opiate analog and derivative of morphine

Clinical data
- Other names: α-Chloromorphide
- ATC code: none

Identifiers
- IUPAC name: 3-Hydroxy-6α-chloro-7,8-didehydro-4,5α-epoxy-17-methylmorphinan
- CAS Number: 63783-53-9
- PubChem CID: 5745724
- ChemSpider: 4676779
- UNII: Q35VX87X79
- CompTox Dashboard (EPA): DTXSID90213223

Chemical and physical data
- Formula: C_{17}H_{18}ClNO_{2}
- Molar mass: 303.79 g·mol^{−1}
- 3D model (JSmol): Interactive image
- SMILES: Cl[C@H]2\C=C/[C@H]5[C@@H]4N(CC[C@@]51c3c(O[C@H]12)c(O)ccc3C4)C
- InChI: InChI=1S/C17H18ClNO2/c1-19-7-6-17-10-3-4-11(18)16(17)21-15-13(20)5-2-9(14(15)17)8-12(10)19/h2-5,10-12,16,20H,6-8H2,1H3/t10-,11-,12+,16-,17-/m0/s1; Key:URUOTSLJEBANHA-ZFDIKFDDSA-N

Chloromorphide (α-chloromorphide) is an opiate analog that is a derivative of morphine, where the 6-hydroxy group has been replaced by chlorine. Developed in 1933 in Germany, it has approximately ten times the potency of morphine. It has similar effects to morphine, such as sedation, analgesia, and respiratory depression.

Chloromorphide does not appear specifically in the Controlled Substances Act 1970 in the United States, but is presumably Schedule II controlled substance as a form of morphine or an analogue of morphine or morphinan. When halogenated morphides and codides are used for research or industrial uses, they are often synthesised on-site.

Chloromorphide is one of a series of opioids known as morphides and codides, which are important precursors and intermediates in the synthesis of semi-synthetic opioid analgesic drugs, especially those with additions, substitutions, or other modifications at the 7, 8, and/or 14 positions on the morphine carbon skeleton. Semisynthetics with changes at other positions can also be made from these compounds. The codeine analog of chloromorphide is α-chlorocodide (alpha-chlorcodide), an intermediate in one method of desomorphine synthesis which uses codeine as precursor.

During the 1930s, the entire series of alpha- and beta-halogenated codides, morphides, dihydromorphides, and dihydrocodides were produced and described, and α-bromomorphide and α-iodomorphide are sometimes currently used in research and manufacturing.
