= Zombie drug =

Zombie drug may refer to:

- Desomorphine, a synthetic opioid also known by its street name krokodil and colloquially called the zombie drug
- alpha-Pyrrolidinopentiophenone, a synthetic stimulant also known by its street name flakka and colloquially called the zombie drug
- Xylazine, a horse sedative used recreationally by itself or in combination with other drugs, also known by its street name tranq and colloquially called the zombie drug
