= Diversion =

Diversion, Diversions, or The Diversion may refer to:

== Arts and entertainment ==
- Diversion (film), a 1980 British television film adapted into the 1987 movie Fatal Attraction
- Diversion (play), a 1927 work by John Van Druten
- The Diversion, a 2001 novel by K. A. Applegate
- Diversion Books, an American publisher
- Diversions, op. 21, for piano left hand and orchestra by Benjamin Britten
- Diversions (album), a 1987 jazz album
- Diversions (album), a 1994 compilation album by Orbital
- Diversions, former name of the National Dance Company Wales
- Diversions Entertainment, manufacturer of One Must Fall video game

== Companies ==
- Divert (company), an American impact technology company based in Massachusetts

== Transport ==
- Diversion airport, an airport designated for an emergency landing
- Traffic diversion, the rerouting of traffic
- Yamaha Diversion, a motorcycle manufactured by Yamaha

== Other uses ==
- Diversion dam, the rerouting of water
- Diversion program, criminal justice scheme usually for minor offenses
- Drug diversion, the transfer of legally prescribed controlled pharmaceuticals to other individuals
- Product diversion, the sale of products in unintended markets
- Weapons diversion, the loss or theft of weapons and ammunition

== See also ==
- Decoy
- Distraction
- Red herring
- Military deception
- Feint
