= Artan Cuku =

Albanian First Director of Police, Albanian Chief of Police

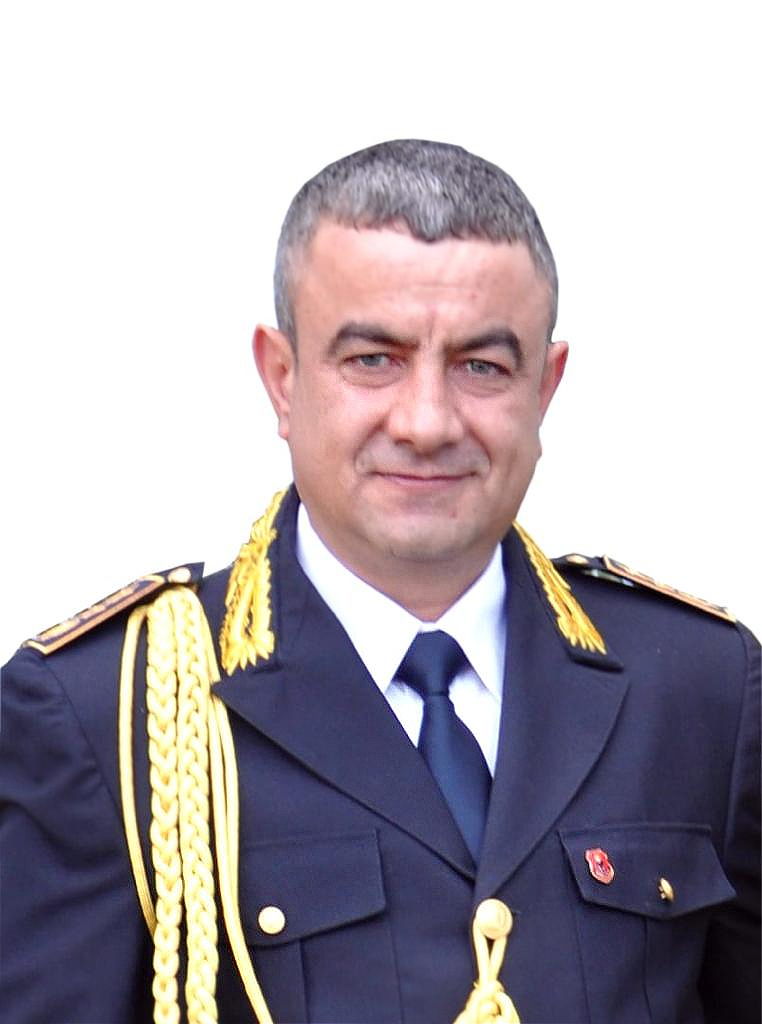
- Cuku in 2012

First Director of the Albanian State Police

Personal details
- Born: Artan Cuku; 14 January 1975 Lurë, Albania
- Died: 8 April 2017 (aged 42) Tirana, Albania
- Resting place: National Martyrs' Cemetery of Albania
- Education: State Police Academy
- Occupation: Chief of Police/First Director, Businessman
- Profession: Law enforcement official, Attorney(unused)
- Awards: Martyr of the Homeland; Golden Eagle Decoration; Medal of Honor

Artan Cuku (14 January 1975 – 8 April 2017) was an Albanian police official and businessman, who was proclaimed Martyr of the Homeland (Albanian: Dëshmor i Atdheut). He served in various high-ranking positions within the Albanian State Police, including First Director of Police in Vlorë County, Vice Director in multiple districts, and Head of the Anti-Money Laundering Sector. Cuku was also the founder of the private security guard service, International Security Albania, and was nicknamed "The Iron Director" (Albanian: Drejtori i Hekurt) for his strict leadership style.

== Early life ==
Artan Cuku was born on 14 January 1975 (officially recorded as 25 January 1975 in the civil status registry of the time) in the village of Old Lurë (Albanian: Lurë e vjetër), Dibër district. He was the fourth child of Sulejman and Nurije Cuku. Cuku completed his primary and middle school education in Lurë Plain (Albanian: Fushe Lurë) and his general secondary education in the city of Peshkopia.

Between 1994 and 1996, he worked as a teacher at the secondary school Nikoll Kaçorri in Lurë. From 1997 to 2000, he attended the State Police Academy, where he graduated with the title of "Senior Police Specialist."

== Career ==
Cuku completed his law studies at the Bachelor and Master levels and passed the bar exam, earning the title of "Lawyer", a profession he never practiced.

Between 2000 and 2014, he completed various courses and training programs both domestically and internationally. These were organized by Albanian, European, and American law enforcement institutions.

In September 2000, after graduating from the Police Academy, he joined the State Police and was appointed to the Section for the Investigation of Crimes at the Malësia e Madhe Police Station.

In 2002, after about a year and a half of experience as a crime investigation specialist in Malësia e Madhe, he was appointed Head of the Crime Investigation Section at the Shkodër Police Station. In this role, he worked closely with local police to combat crime by arresting local offenders and dismantling criminal groups.

Later in 2002, Cuku was selected by officials from the Ministry of Internal Affairs to serve as Head of the Crime Investigation Section at the Durrës Police Station. He held this position until 2004, when he was transferred to Tropojë.

In 2004, he was appointed Chief of the Tropojë Police Station. He organized operations to capture highly dangerous individuals from Lekbibaj and led numerous weapon seizure missions following the widespread weapon diversion of 1997. During his tenure, he participated in conflicts involving gunfire but no injuries were reported among his officers.

After several months in Tropojë, Cuku was transferred to Berat in 2004, where he worked in the Anti-Terrorist Acts Sector. By the end of that year, he was appointed Head of the Crime Investigation Section at Police Station No. 4 in Tirana, focusing on investigating cold cases from 1997 and recompiling case files to support arrests.

In 2005, he transitioned to the Tirana District Police Directorate as a Leading Specialist. Between 2006 and 2007, he served in the Crimes Against the Person Sector and the Organized Crime Sector in Tirana.

From mid-2007, Cuku held several vice-director positions in district police commands: Vlorë (2007), Fier (2007–2008), Berat (2008–2009), and Tirana (2009–2011). In each role, he contributed to reducing crime rates in these regions.

After 2011, he was appointed Head of the Anti-Money Laundering Sector in the General Directorate of the State Police, a position he held for about a year.

From early 2012 to the end of 2013, he served as the Police First Director of the Vlorë District. At the end of 2013, he was transferred to the Directorate of Strategic Studies in the State Police, where he worked until June 2014, when he was released from the force.

== Death ==
On 8 April 2017, at approximately 8:00 p.m., Artan Cuku was killed outside his home on Rruga e Kosovarëve, Tirana. The perpetrator of his murder is Mikel Shallari (born 6 November 1993) in Kuçovë. Following his death, the Prosecutor's Office for Serious Crimes initiated an investigation under Criminal Procedure No. 139/2017. The investigation concluded that his murder was work-related and occurred in the course of his duties as First Director of the Vlora District Police Department. The crime was classified under Articles 79/b and 25 of the Albanian Criminal Code ("Murder of state police officers").

On 9 April 2017, the State Police held a state tribute ceremony in his honour.

Cuku was buried in the National Martyrs' Cemetery.

== Awards and decorations ==
=== Medal of Honor ===
On 12 June 2017, Artan Cuku was posthumously awarded the "Medal of Honor" by the Minister of Internal Affairs for his special merits and services in the fight against crime, ensuring public order and tranquility.

=== Golden Eagle Decoration ===
On 27 June 2017, Artan Cuku was posthumously awarded the "Golden Eagle Decoration" by President Bujar Nishani of Albania, for his dedication, sacrifice, and leadership in the fight against organized crime as a member of the State Police.

=== Honorary Citizen of Dibër ===
On 9 February 2018, Dibër Municipality awarded Artan Cuku the title "Honorary Citizen of Dibër" posthumously for his significant contributions to the State Police, his efforts in the fight against crime, and his inputs to the moral, historical and noble values of the land of Lura and Dibra.

=== Martyr of the Homeland ===
On 2 April 2019, Artan Cuku was declared a "Martyr of the Homeland" by The Central Commission on the Status of Martyr of the Homeland, with his family receiving the symbol "Family of the Martyr of the Homeland".

=== Honor of Dibër District ===
On 27 June 2019, Artan Cuku was posthumously awarded the title "Honor of Dibër District" by the Dibër District Council for his contributions to the State Police and his sacrifice in fighting organized crime.

=== Artan Cuku Street in Peshkopi, Albania ===
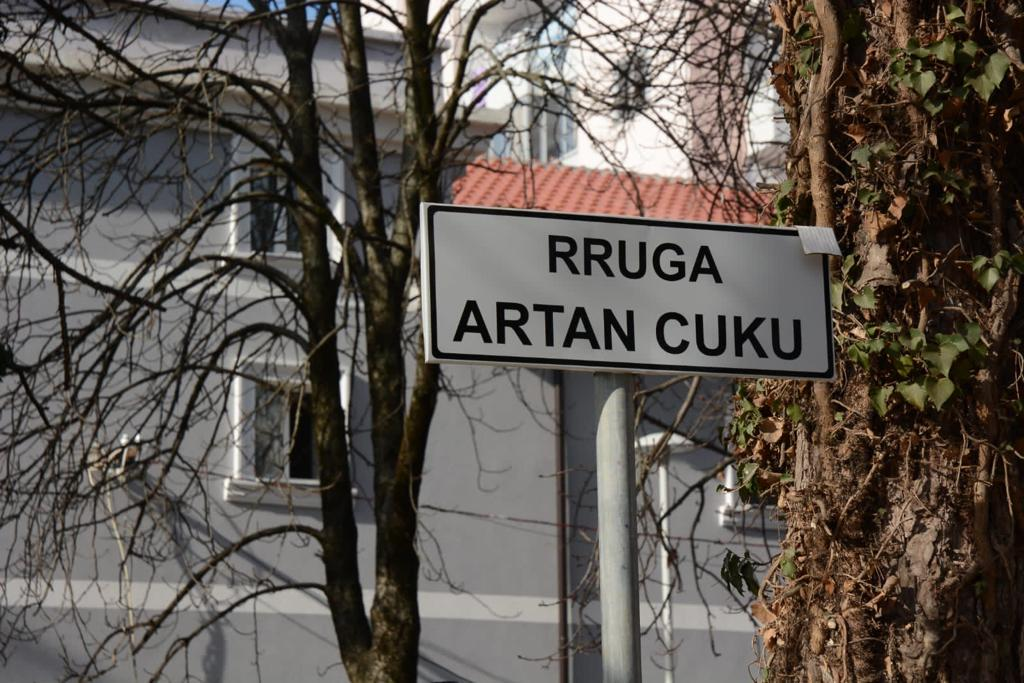
Artan Cuku road in Peshkopi, Albania

On 24 December 2021, the street starting from "Elez Isufi" Boulevard, through the museum, and ending at the Palace of Culture in Peshkopi was named "Artan Cuku" by the Dibër Municipal Council in his honor.

=== Citizen of Honor ===
On 18 February 2022, Kamëz Municipal Council awarded Artan Cuku the title "Citizen of Honor" for his values, contributions to the State Police, and efforts in promoting moral and noble values.

=== Kamëz Palace of Culture Named After Artan Cuku ===
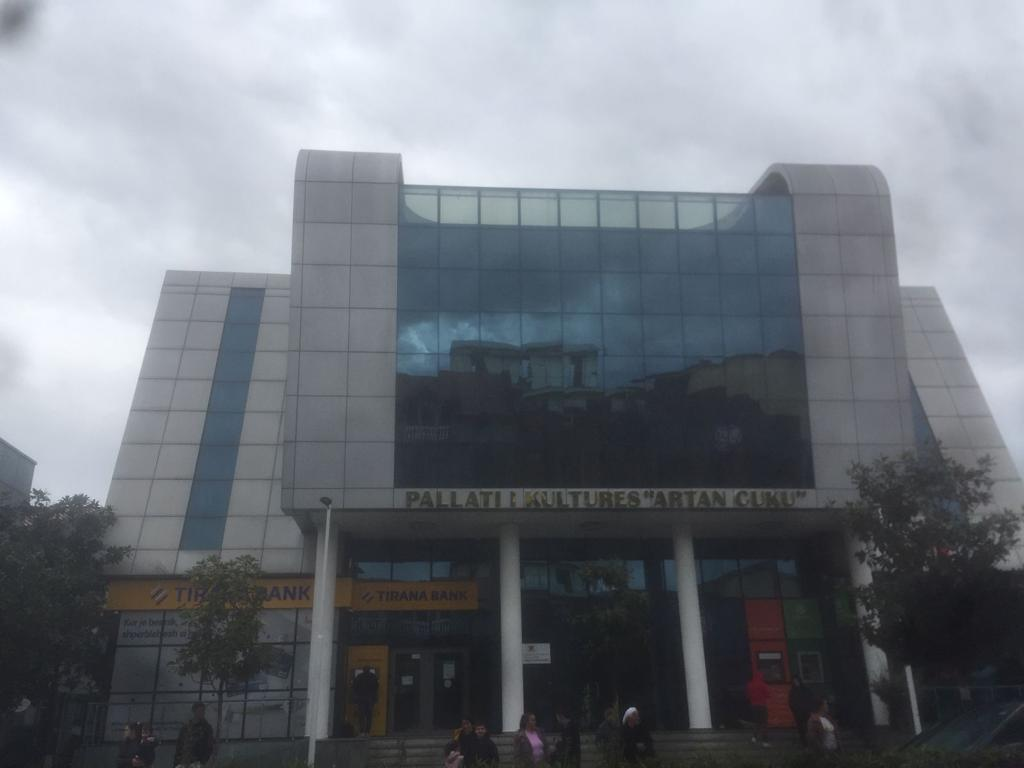
Kamëz Palace of Culture named after Artan Cuku (outside picture)

On 18 February 2022, Kamëz Municipal Council named the "Kamëz Palace of Culture" after Artan Cuku.

=== Cup of the Republic of Albania in honor of Artan Cuku ===
On 5 November 2022, the National Weightlifting Federation organized the Cup of the Republic of Albania to raise and honor Artan Cuku.

=== Artan Cuku Street in Durrës ===
On 16 April 2024, Durrës Municipality named a street located at Ward no. 2, Administrative Unit no. 1. "Artan Cuku" in honor of his legacy.

== Publications in his memory ==
The murder of Artan Cuku is regarded as one of the most significant cases in Albanian history in the past century, and is featured in 100 Most Sensational Murders in the History of the Albanian State (in All Albanian Territories) by Roland Qafoku.

Cuku's assassination is included in Faces of Assassination, a book compiled by global experts and published by the Global Initiative Against Transnational Organized Crime, based in Geneva. The book documents 50 high-profile murders, including executions of state officials from 40 countries after 2000, with Cuku's murder among them. His figure and impact are also described in "Personalities of Dibra (Encyclopedia of Dibra 3)".

Posthumously, two books were dedicated to him: Artan Cuku in Memoriam, devised and prepared by former General Director of the State Police, Ahmet Prençi, with contributions from journalists, politicians, and colleagues, and Jam pri' Lure by Fatos Daci.

In 2024, two more publications were released: Rilindja e Emrave (Rebirth of Names) and Të Rënët (The Fallen), to honor Cuku's legacy.
