= C18H20ClNO2 =

The molecular formula C_{18}H_{20}ClNO_{2} may refer to:

- α-Chlorocodide, an opioid analog that is a derivative of codeine
- β-Chlorocodide, an opioid analog and isomer of α-chlorocodide
- SKF-83,959, a synthetic benzazepine derivative
