= Article 2 paragraph 9 of the Single Convention on narcotic drugs =

Provision in 1961 international treaty

Article 2(9) of the Single Convention on Narcotic Drugs, 1961 is a treaty provision allowing countries to exempt from international drug control certains drugs "which are commonly used in industry for other than medical or scientific purposes" under specific conditions.

This clause has long been used in the context of industrial hemp and cannabidiol and has garnered attention and some controversy more recently in discussions about the legalisation of recreational cannabis, coca leaf, and other controlled drugs in possible compliance with international drug law.

== Text ==
Article 2 is titled "Substances under control." Paragraph 9 closes the article, providing the framework for the cases where substances are exempt from such control.

The text of article 2 paragraph 9 reads:

Parties are not required to apply the provisions of this Convention to drugs which are commonly used in industry for other than medical or scientific purposes, provided that:

(a) They ensure by appropriate methods of denaturing or by other means that the drugs so used are not liable to be abused or have ill effects (article 3, paragraph 3) and that the harmful substances cannot in practice be recovered; and

(b) They include in the statistical information (article 20) furnished by them the amount of each drug so used.

The Commentary on the Single Convention, published in 1973, provide some context about this article:

It was mentioned in the Plenipotentiary Conference, during the discussion of the draft of the paragraph under consideration, that the provision was of no immediate practical importance, but had been inserted to anticipate possible future developments. The developments appear still to be in the future at the time of this writing.

The liability “to be abused” or to “have ill effects” which is mentioned in subparagraph (a) and which must be prevented by the Government concerned “by appropriate methods of denaturing or by other means”, is the same dangerous property as that which under article 3, paragraph 3, subparagraph (iii) justifies the placement of a substance under the international narcotics regime. […]. Not only must Governments ensure that the recovery of drugs used up in manufacture is prevented or made impracticable, but it must also be made impossible or impracticable to restore the dangerous properties of those drugs which are not used up in the industrial process, but only transformed for use for harmless non-medical purposes, e.g. as dyes.

Under article 20, paragraph 1, subparagraph (b), Governments must include in their annual statistical reports to the Board the quantity of each drug utilized for the manufacture of any substance not covered by the Single Convention, and the name of the substance obtained.

== Analysis ==
In the Single Convention, "other than medical and scientific purposes" are not subject to the general legal framework established in Article 4(c), but exempt under Article 2(9). The Single Convention is silent as to whether Article 2(9) only excludes drugs when used in industrial processes that do not involve consumption by humans, or if any use that is not medical or scientific (including consumption by humans for recreational use) can be exempted under the provision. The Commentary is unhelpful: on one hand, it only cites two examples (dyes, and photography), on the other hand it mentions broad statement (referring to "other than medical and scientific purposes" as "common industrial uses") which do not help narrow down the meaning of the provision.

Article 2(9) is used as a legal basis for the non-application of drug control to low-THC cannabis products derived from industrial hemp crops.

Some analysts are of the view that "recreational use" is also part of the "other than medical and scientific purposes" and that the words "common in industry" can refer to the cannabis industry. It is also suggested that, based on the maxim of maximum effectiveness, or ut res magis valeat quam pereat (that the matter may have effect rather than fail ) the "other means" in subparagraph (a) can be understood as substance abuse prevention and harm reduction measures, and "harmful substance" must be understood as "harmful gist" without which the entire provisions necessarily "leads to a result which is manifestly absurd or unreasonable" (VCLT article 32). On this basis, they argue a country's legalization with prevention and harm reduction measures (to meet paragraph (a)) and a reporting of data (to meet paragraph (b)) would be compliant with the Single Convention. It has even been advanced that article 2(9) constitutes an obligation to harm reduction. Other analysts have rejected the applicability of Article 2(9) to recreational cannabis, on the grounds that "both the original intent and subsequent practice have strictly limited this exemption"

== Implementation ==
=== Cannabis ===
Article 2(9) is used by countries to exempt hemp and in particular CBD-rich hemp products.

In 2021, Malta legalized cannabis, becoming the first EU country to do so. In its law, Malta used the language of article 2 (9).

In 2022, Switzerland adopted a model of experimental regulations that has been argued to be aligned with the provisions of article 2(9).

Other countries that have legalized recreational cannabis do not rely on the provisions of article 2 paragraph 9.

=== Coca leaf ===
There has been discussions around the use of article 2.9 to regulate non-medical uses of coca leaf. A draft Colombian decree to regulate the production of coca, cannabis, and poppy (which did not enter into force as of 2025) also made a reference to article 2 paragraph 9 and article 27 of the Single Convention in its opening provisions.
