= Protocol amending the Single Convention on Narcotic Drugs =

1972 drug control treaty amendment

The 1972 Protocol amending the Single Convention on Narcotic Drugs was a protocol that made several changes to the Single Convention on Narcotic Drugs. It highlighted the need for treatment and rehabilitation of drug addicts, instructing parties to take "all practicable measures for the prevention of abuse of psychotropic substances and for the early identification, treatment, education, after-care, rehabilitation, and social reintegration of the persons involved". It also expanded the International Narcotics Control Board from 11 members to 13 members.

In addition, the Protocol added Article 21 bis, Limitation of Production of Opium, which allowed the Board to deduct from a nation's opium production quota the amounts it determines have been produced within that nation and introduced into the illicit traffic. This could happen as a result of failing to control either illicit production or diversion of licitly produced opium to illicit purposes. In this way, the Board can essentially punish a nation that does not control its illicit opium traffic by imposing an economic sanction on its medicinal opium industry. This provision is ineffective on nations that are not opium exporters.

The Protocol also adds a provision to Article 22 stating that "A Party prohibiting cultivation of the opium poppy or the cannabis plant shall take appropriate measures to seize any plants illicitly cultivated and destroy them, except for small quantities required by the Party for scientific and research purposes". The effect of this amendment is to require nations to actually enforce the laws on their books against cultivation of illicit drugs.

The Protocol adds a provision to Article 36 allowing for "treatment, education, after-care, rehabilitation and social reintegration" as an alternative to incarceration of drug abusers.

A Commentary to the Protocol was written by Adolf Lande, former Secretary of the Permanent Central Narcotics Board and Drug Supervisory Body, under the responsibility of the United Nations Office of Legal Affairs. The Commentary was designed to help nations interpret the Convention.

As of 2013, the Protocol has been ratified by 125 states. It was initially signed by 54 states.
