= Adolf Lande =

Adolf Lande (1905–197?) served for many years as secretary of the Permanent Central Narcotics Board and the Drug Supervisory Body (two international drug organs) and was the primary drafter of the Single Convention on Narcotic Drugs. He also wrote the Commentary of both the Single Convention and the Convention on Psychotropic Substances. These documents are crucial to the interpretation of the treaties. Lande was considered one of the most foremost authorities on UN international drug control legislation.

== See also ==
- United Nations International Drug Control Programme
