= Protocol for Limiting and Regulating the Cultivation of the Poppy Plant, the Production of, International and Wholesale Trade in, and Use of Opium =

1953 drug control treaty

- Signed: June 23, 1953
- Location: New York City
- Effective: March 8, 1963
- Signatories: 34
- Parties: 51

The Protocol for Limiting and Regulating the Cultivation of the Poppy Plant, the Production of, International and Wholesale Trade in, and Use of Opium, signed on 23 June 1953 in New York City, was a drug control treaty, promoted by Harry J. Anslinger, with the purpose of imposing stricter controls on opium production.

Article 6 of the treaty limited opium production to seven countries. Article 2 stated that Parties were required to "limit the use of opium exclusively to medical and scientific needs". It did not receive sufficient ratifications to enter into force until 1963, by which time it had been superseded by the 1961 Single Convention on Narcotic Drugs.
