= Cannabis in Malta =

Legality of cannabis in Europe Legal for recreational use Legal for medical use Illegal

Cannabis in Malta is decriminalised, within limits, to grow, use, and possess for adults. In 2018, the Parliament of Malta legalised medical cannabis, but only for a resident of Malta with a prescription from a local doctor. Permission of medical weed from another country is not acceptable in Malta. On 14 December 2021, the Parliament of Malta decriminalised recreational cannabis for personal possession and use for those aged 18-years-old and over, becoming the first EU country to do so.

== Guerrilla gardening ==
In 2014, news media reported that cannabis saplings were appearing in roundabouts and centre strips in Gozo and Zebbug. It happened after the government planned to decriminalise the weed if they win the election, but when they refused after they won, local people to show their gratefulness, planted cannabis in roundabouts.

== 2015 ==
In April 2015, new policies to decriminalise cannabis in Malta came into force. Simple possession still remained an "arrestable offense", so that the police remained able to fight drug trafficking. The possession of a minimal amount of drugs (3.5g; 1/8 oz) for personal consumption was effectively decriminalised. First-time offenders will be handed fines of between €50 and €100 in the case of cannabis possession. Repeat offenders will appear before a Drug Offenders Rehabilitation Board, headed by retired Chief of Justice, which will set conditions for rehabilitation. Breaching the conditions would be tantamount to a criminal offense. The Magistrates Court - in cases not involving the use of weapons or violence - would be able to act as a Drugs Court and refer the accused for treatment to the rehabilitation board.

== Medical cannabis ==
Sativex was approved for prescription use in 2015. As of July 2017, however, no patients have been treated with it.

In March 2018, the Maltese president signed into law legislation approving medical cannabis with a prescription, though the legislation did not detail which specific conditions would merit the use of cannabis.

== Recreational cannabis ==
On 18 February 2021, the Maltese Prime Minister Robert Abela announced plans to introduce a law that would legalise possession of a small amount of cannabis and plants for personal use.

On 14 December 2021, recreational cannabis cultivation and use was legalised for those aged 18-years-old and above. In Malta, it is now legal to carry up to 7g (1/4 oz) cannabis, each household may grow up to 4 plants and up to 50g (1 3/4 oz) of dried and stored cannabis. It is also legal to establish cannabis associations, known as Cannabis Social Clubs, which can cultivate cannabis to distribute among members, up to a maximum of 7g (1/4 oz) per day and 50g (1 3/4 oz) per month. Non-profit organisations are also allowed to grow cannabis in Malta to sell to up to 500 members in the country but are not allowed near schools or youth clubs. Smoking in public remains banned. Possessing up to 28 grams (1 oz) can result in a fine of between €50 and a maximum of €100 but will not result in a criminal record.

The law came into force with the signature of President George Vella on 18 December 2021. The Authority on the Responsible Use of Cannabis, a new public body in Malta, oversees the new law regarding legal cannabis.
