= Desomorphine =

Semi-synthetic opioid, morphine analogue

Desomorphine Krokodil

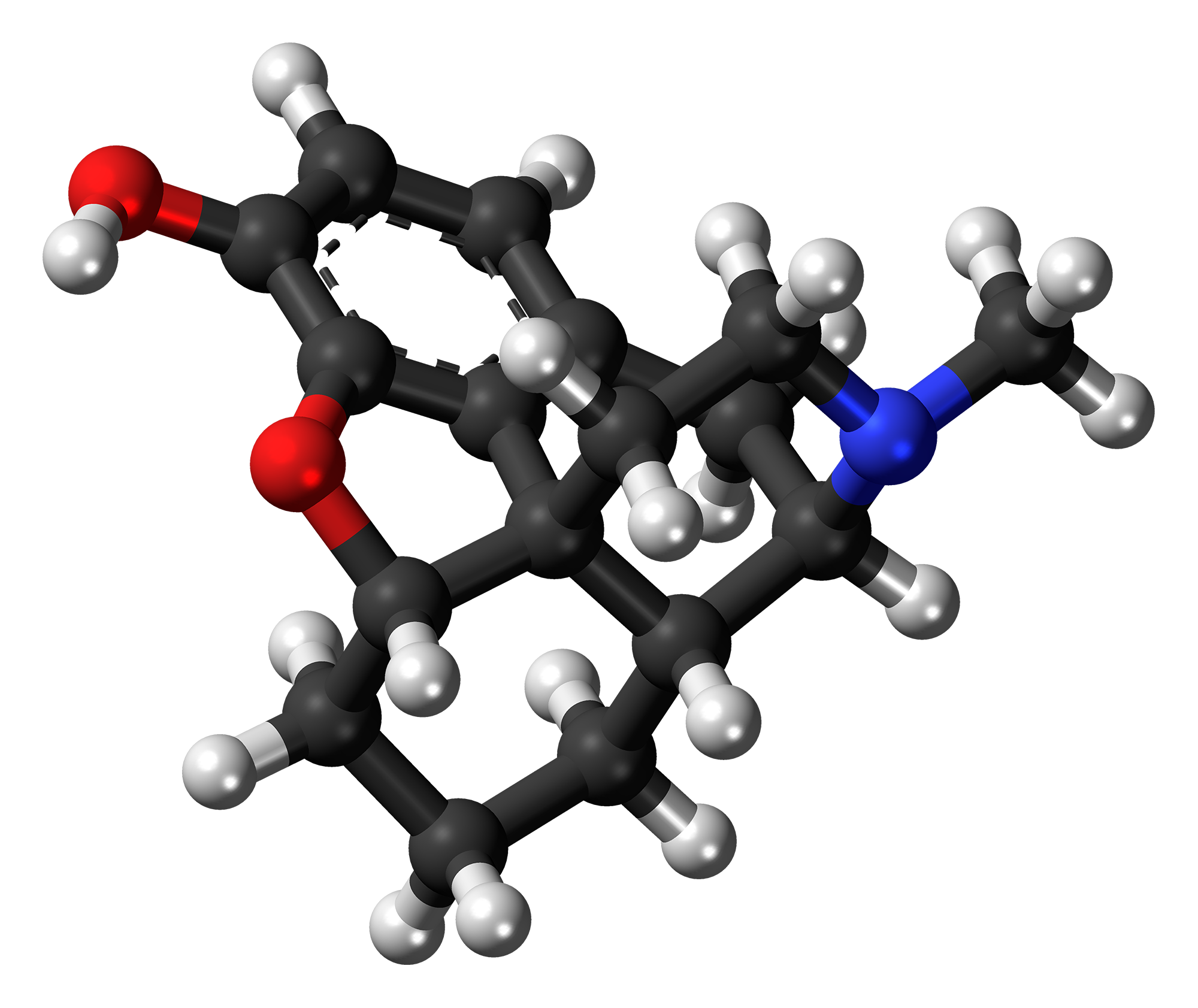

Clinical data
- Trade names: Permonid
- Other names: Desomorphine, krokodil, dihydrodesoxymorphine, Permonid
- Addiction liability: Very High
- ATC code: none

Legal status
- Legal status: AU: S9 (Prohibited substance); BR: Class F1 (Prohibited narcotics); CA: Schedule I; DE: Anlage I (Authorized scientific use only); UK: Class A; US: Schedule I; SE: Förteckning I

Pharmacokinetic data
- Metabolism: Liver
- Metabolites: Nordesomorphine, desomorphine-N-oxide, norhydroxydesomorphine, others
- Onset of action: 15-30s IV, 3-5 min SC

Identifiers
- IUPAC name: 4,5α-Epoxy-17-methylmorphinan-3-ol
- CAS Number: 427-00-9
- PubChem CID: 5362456
- DrugBank: DB01531
- ChemSpider: 4515044
- UNII: 7OP86J5E33
- KEGG: D12670
- ChEMBL: ChEMBL2106274
- CompTox Dashboard (EPA): DTXSID10195390
- ECHA InfoCard: 100.006.406

Chemical and physical data
- Formula: C_{17}H_{21}NO_{2}
- Molar mass: 271.360 g·mol^{−1}
- 3D model (JSmol): Interactive image
- SMILES: OC1=C2O[C@@H]3[C@@]45C2=C(C[C@H]([C@@H]5CCC3)N(C)CC4)C=C1
- InChI: InChI=1S/C17H21NO2/c1-18-8-7-17-11-3-2-4-14(17)20-16-13(19)6-5-10(15(16)17)9-12(11)18/h5-6,11-12,14,19H,2-4,7-9H2,1H3/t11-,12+,14-,17+/m0/s1; Key:LNNWVNGFPYWNQE-GMIGKAJZSA-N

Desomorphine (Note: Also known by: dihydrodesoxymorphine and its former brand name Permonid.) (or in some formulations known as Krokodil) is a semi-synthetic opioid commercialized by Roche, with powerful, fast-acting effects, such as sedation and analgesia. It was first discovered and patented in Germany by a German team working for Knoll in 1920 but was not generally recognized. It was later synthesized in 1932 by American chemist Lyndon Frederick Small. Small also successfully patented it in 1934 in the United States. Desomorphine was used in Germany, Austria, and Switzerland under the brand name Permonid and was described as having a fast onset and a short duration of action, with relatively little nausea compared to equivalent doses of morphine. Dose for dose it is roughly ten times more potent than morphine, with 1 mg desomorphine being equivalent 10 mg morphine, via the intravenous (IV) or intramuscular (IM) routes.

Desomorphine is a morphine analogue where the 6-hydroxyl group and the 7,8 double bond have been reduced. The traditional synthesis of desomorphine starts from α-chlorocodide, which is itself obtained by treating codeine with thionyl chloride. By catalytic reduction, α-chlorocodide gives dihydrodesoxycodeine, which yields desomorphine on demethylation.

A desomorphine product, usually based on codeine, has been developed as a recreational drug. The product in question is typically a highly impure variant of desomorphine. The scaly sores and necrosis that develop around the injection site has prompted the name krokodil (Russian for crocodile).

== Uses ==
=== Medical ===
Desomorphine was previously used in Germany, Austria, and Switzerland for the treatment of severe pain. While medical usage of desomorphine was terminated in 1981, during the final years leading up to that it was being used to treat a single patient in Bern, Switzerland with a rare illness. While desomorphine was found to be faster acting and more effective than morphine for the rapid relief of severe pain, its shorter duration of action and the relatively more severe respiratory depression produced at equianalgesic doses, as well as a high incidence of other side effects such as hypotension and urinary retention, were felt to outweigh any potential advantages.

=== Recreational ===
Desomorphine abuse in Russia attracted international attention in 2010 due to an increase in clandestine production, presumably due to its relatively simple synthesis from codeine available over the counter. Abuse of homemade desomorphine was first reported in Siberia in 2003 when Russia started a major crackdown on heroin production and trafficking, but it has since spread throughout Russia and the neighboring former Soviet republics.

The drug can be made from codeine and iodine derived from over-the-counter medications and red phosphorus from match strikers, in a process similar to the manufacturing of methamphetamine from pseudoephedrine. Like methamphetamine, desomorphine made this way is often contaminated with various agents. The street name in Russia for homemade desomorphine is krokodil (Russian: крокодил, crocodile), possibly related to the chemical name of the precursor α-chlorocodide, or the resemblance of the skin damage caused by the drug to a crocodile's leather. Due to difficulties in procuring heroin, combined with easy and cheap access to over-the-counter pharmacy products containing codeine in Russia, use of krokodil increased until 2012. In 2012 the Russian federal government introduced new restrictions for the sale of codeine-containing medications. This policy change diminished but did not extinguish krokodil use in Russia. It has been estimated that around 100,000 people use krokodil in Russia and around 20,000 in Ukraine. One death in Poland in December 2011 was also believed to have been caused by krokodil use, and its use has been confirmed among Russian expatriate communities in other European countries. In 2013 two cases of Krokodil use were reported in the United States. A single case of oral desomorphine use was reported in Spain in 2014. There are reports of krokodil use in the United Kingdom.

== Adverse effects ==
=== Toxicity ===
==== Toxicity of desomorphine ====
Animal studies comparing pure desomorphine to morphine showed it to have increased toxicity, more potent relief of pain, higher levels of sedation, decreased respiration, and increased digestive activity.

==== Toxicity of krokodil ====
Illicitly produced desomorphine is typically far from pure and often contains large amounts of toxic substances and contaminants as a result of the drug producers neglecting to remove highly toxic reactants and solvents left over from synthesis. This neglect could be due to the producers having a limited understanding of chemistry or as a way to avoid the costs of extracting the toxic material. Injecting any such mixture can cause serious damage to the skin, blood vessels, bone, and muscles, sometimes requiring limb amputation in long-term users. This highly impure product may have received the name of krokodil due to its propensity for causing gangrene, which can lead to users of the drug's skin to resemble that of a crocodile.

Causes of this damage are associated with iodine, phosphorus and other toxic substances that are present after synthesis. Desomorphine producers would use cheap, readily available but relatively toxic and impure solvents such as battery acid, gasoline or paint thinner during the reaction scheme, without adequately removing them afterwards before distribution. Strong acids and bases such as hydrochloric acid and sodium hydroxide are also employed without measuring the pH of the final solution, and analysis of leftover solutions of "krokodil" in used syringes showed the pH was typically less than 3 (i.e. as acidic as lemon juice). Failure to remove insoluble fillers and binding aids from the codeine tablets used as starting material, as well as co-administration with pharmaceuticals such as tropicamide and tianeptine, are also cited as possible contributors to the high toxicity observed in users.

The frequent occurrence of tissue damage and infection among illicit users are what gained the drug its nickname of the flesh-eating drug, or the zombie drug, as homemade versions made under inadequate conditions contain multiple impurities and toxic substances that lead to severe tissue damage and subsequent infection as a direct consequence of use. Gangrene, phlebitis, thrombosis (blood clots), pneumonia, meningitis, septicaemia (blood infection), osteomyelitis (bone infection), liver and kidney damage, brain damage, and HIV/AIDS are common serious adverse health effects observed among users of krokodil. Sometimes, the user will miss the vein when injecting the desomorphine, creating an abscess and causing death of the flesh surrounding the entry-point.

=== Reinforcement disorders ===
Abuse potential studies of desomorphine in animals had shown that it exhibited limited addiction liability. In monkeys, desomorphine had 10 times the depressant effect of morphine, developed tolerance less rapidly and less completely, and did not lead to the appearance of abstinence symptoms during withdrawal. Studies in rats receiving a daily injection of desomorphine at a constant dose showed they slowly developed tolerance to the depressant effect of desomorphine.

== Chemistry ==
One synthesis of desomorphine from codeine

Desomorphine has a molecular weight of 271.35 g/mol and three salts are known: hydrobromide (as in the original Permonid brand; free-base conversion ratio 0.770), hydrochloride (0.881) and sulfate (0.802). Its freebase form is slightly soluble in water (1.425 g/L at 25 °C), although its salts are very water-soluble; its freebase form is also very soluble in most polar organic solvents (like acetone, ethanol and ethyl acetate). Its melting point is 189 °C. It has a pK_{a} of 9.69. Desomorphine comes in four isoforms, A, B, C, and D and the latter two appear to be the more researched and used.

Krokodil is made from codeine mixed with other substances. The codeine is retrieved from over-the-counter medicine and is then mixed with ethanol, gasoline, red phosphorus, iodine, hydrochloric acid and paint thinner (a mixture of aliphatic C_{7} to C_{12} hydrocarbons, either open-chain or alicyclic). Toxic nitrogen oxide fumes emerge from the drug when heated to decomposition.

== History ==
Desomorphine was first discovered and patented in Germany by a German team working for Knoll in 1920. Desomorphine was later synthesised in the U.S. in 1932 and patented on 13 November 1934. In Russia, desomorphine was declared an illegal narcotic analgesic in 1998. However, while codeine-containing drugs generally have been prescription products in Europe, in Russia they were sold freely over the counter until June 2012. The number of users in Russia was estimated to have reached around one million at the peak of the drug's popularity.

== Society and culture ==
=== Legal status ===
In the US, desomorphine is a Schedule 1 controlled substance, indicating that the United States FDA has determined that there are no legal medicinal uses for desomorphine in the United States. It has maintained this status as a controlled substance since 1936. The drug is a Narcotic in Schedule I of the Controlled Substances Act 1970 of the United States as drug number (ACSCN) 9055. It is therefore subject to annual aggregate manufacturing quotas in the United States, and in 2014 the quota for desomorphine was 5 grams. It is produced as a hydrochloride (free base conversion ratio 0.85) and sulphate (0.80).

=== North American media ===
Media in the U.S. and Canada have brought awareness to desomorphine. There have been incidents reported where desomorphine had supposedly been present within either country, but no incidents have been confirmed by any drug testing or analytical results, and desomorphine use in North America is still considered unconfirmed.

== See also ==
- Conolidine
- Necrotizing fasciitis
