= Α-Chlorocodide =

α-Chlorocodide

Names
- IUPAC name 6β-Chloro-3-methoxy-17-methyl-7,8-didehydro-4,5α-epoxymorphinan
- Systematic IUPAC name (4R,4aR,7R,7aR,12bS)-7-Chloro-9-methoxy-2,3,4,4a,7,7a-hexahydro-1H-4,12-methano[1]benzofuro[3,2-e]isoquinoline
- Other names 6β-Chloro-6-deoxycodeine; 6-Chloro-6-deoxyisocodeine

Identifiers
CAS Number	467-08-3
3D model (JSmol)	Interactive image
ChemSpider	4588984
PubChem CID	5486612
UNII	4YWU3WE48H
CompTox Dashboard (EPA)	DTXSID10963637
- InChI: InChI=1S/C18H20ClNO2/c1-20-8-7-18-11-4-5-12(19)17(18)22-16-14(21-2)6-3-10(15(16)18)9-13(11)20/h3-6,11-13,17H,7-9H2,1-2H3/t11-,12+,13+,17-,18-/m0/s1 Key: CVLHOXTTXWEUCL-KEMUOJQUSA-N; InChI=1/C18H20ClNO2/c1-20-8-7-18-11-4-5-12(19)17(18)22-16-14(21-2)6-3-10(15(16)18)9-13(11)20/h3-6,11-13,17H,7-9H2,1-2H3/t11-,12+,13+,17-,18-/m0/s1 Key: CVLHOXTTXWEUCL-KEMUOJQUBZ
- SMILES: Cl[C@@H]2\C=C/[C@H]5[C@@H]4N(CC[C@@]51c3c(O[C@H]12)c(OC)ccc3C4)C

Properties
Chemical formula	C_{18}H_{20}ClNO_{2}
Molar mass	317.81 g·mol^{−1}
Melting point	151 to 154 °C (304 to 309 °F; 424 to 427 K)
- Except where otherwise noted, data are given for materials in their standard state (at 25 °C [77 °F], 100 kPa). Infobox references

α-Chlorocodide is an opioid analog that is a derivative of codeine in which the 6-hydroxy group has been replaced by chlorine.

== See also ==
- Chloromorphide
