= Drug diversion =

Transfer of legally prescribed controlled pharmaceuticals to other individuals

Drug diversion is a medical and legal concept involving the transfer of a legally-prescribed controlled substance from the individual for whom it was prescribed to another person for any illicit use. The definition varies slightly among different jurisdictions, but the transfer of a controlled substance alone usually does not constitute "diversion," since certain controlled substances that are prescribed to a child are intended to be administered by an adult, as directed by a medical professional (the prescriber). The term is named for "diverting" said drugs from their original, intended, licit medical purpose.

Alternately, in some jurisdictions, drug diversion programs are available to first time offenders of drug laws, which "divert" offenders from the criminal justice system to a program of education and rehabilitation.

== Imprecise, Misleading Definition of "Diversion" ==
The definition of "drug diversion" is not all-inclusive or all-encompassing, in the sense that it does not account for the potential of any substance, chemical, formulation, molecule, medication, or "drug" in the broadest sense to be diverted from one individual to another; it is not exclusive to controlled substances, as even substances that are not "scheduled" (neither "controlled" per, regulated by, nor listed in the Controlled Substances Act or related analogues and derivatives, which are regulated in the United States by the Federal Analogue Act.

Even medication sold over-the-counter or behind the counter can be diverted from one individual to another for purposes of substance abuse, often for recreational purposes and/or as a means of self-medicating that have hitherto been improperly or insufficiently treated (perhaps due to not being "taken seriously" by medical providers) or due to a patient's inability to access primary health care services due to not being insured; specific to the U.S., many Americans neither have nor qualify for health insurance coverage in any form. Perhaps most commonly, diversion serves to aid clandestine chemistry and production of methaqualone, glutethimide, ethinamate, ethchlorvynol, methyprylon.

OTC medications that can be misused (used recreationally (depending on one's perspective) include diphenhydramine, doxylamine, chlorpheniramine, dimenhydrinate, propylhexedrine, dextromethorphan, levmetamfetamine, nicotine replacement therapy products, oral caffeine dosage forms, vitamins, minerals, and dietary or nutritional supplements. Medication containing the sympathomimetic amines ephedrine and pseudoephedrine can be purchased without a prescription, albeit behind the counter of the pharmacy upon showing ID, signing a log and legal disclaimer, and not exceeding monthly purchase limits, as defined by the Combat Methamphetamine Epidemic Act of 2005.

Theoretically, prescription drugs defined as "controlled substances" (i.e. prescription drugs regulated or "scheduled" by the Controlled Substances Act) are the most likely to be misused or diverted.

== Commonly diverted drugs ==
Chemical structure of zolpidem, a Z-drug

Chemical classes of commonly diverted controlled substances include:

=== Central Nervous System (CNS) Depressants ===
- Benzodiazepines, including diazepam and clonazepam are often prescribed to treat social anxiety, generalized anxiety, akathisia, and anxiety related to, or stemming from, obsessive-compulsive disorder (OCD) (such as compulsive decluttering); lorazepam and alprazolam are often utilized to treat symptoms of social anxiety and panic disorder, acute panic attacks, and akathisia; temazepam, flurazepam, triazolam, and sodium clorazepate are utilized for the treatment of [even "treatment-resistant"] insomnia by virtue of their status as sedative-hypnotic, calming, and soporific (sleep-inducing) agents; and midazolam is frequently utilized for muscle relaxation and easing of muscle spasms).
- Opioids (analgesics for relief of chronic, severe pain in cases of broken bones and cancers), including codeine, morphine, hydrocodone, oxycodone, tapentadol, hydromorphone, and fentanyl.
- Z-drugs, including zolpidem (Ambien) and eszopiclone (Lunesta) – prescription sleep medications
- Stimulants (CNS stimulants, psychostimulants, "uppers") including amphetamines, methylphenidate – prescribed to treat ADHD, narcolepsy, and obesity.

According to the United States Department of Justice, "Most pharmaceuticals abused in the United States are diverted by doctor shopping, forged prescriptions, theft and, increasingly, via the Internet." To reduce the occurrence of pharmaceutical diversion by doctor shopping and prescription fraud, all states have established prescription monitoring programs (PMPs) that facilitate the collection, analysis, and reporting of information regarding pharmaceutical drug prescriptions.

== Registration of drug suppliers ==
21 U.S.C. § 823 of the Controlled Substances Act provides for registration of manufacturers and distributors of controlled substances. The criteria for registering manufacturers of Schedule I and II drugs are particularly strict and call for "limiting the importation and bulk manufacture of such controlled substances to a number of establishments which can produce an adequate and uninterrupted supply of these substances under adequately competitive conditions for legitimate medical, scientific, research, and industrial purposes." The Attorney General must make a positive determination that the registration would be "consistent with the public interest."

For manufacturers of other drugs, and for drug distributors, the regulations are substantially less strict: "The Attorney General shall register an applicant… unless he determines that the issuance of such registration is inconsistent with the public interest." The criteria for both manufacture and distribution is somewhat biased in favor of established industries, favoring "past experience" and a record of compliance with drug laws The Controlled Substances Act also provides for the registration of medical practitioners (i.e., physicians, dentists, veterinarians, etc.), pharmacies and hospitals that prescribe, administer, or dispense controlled substances directly to patients, as well as individuals conducting approved research involving controlled substances. This category also includes narcotic treatment programs that administer and dispense primarily methadone for narcotic addiction treatment.

=== Examples ===
This activity can occur in many venues:

The Cincinnati Post has reported on its frequency. John Burke, an expert on the issue, was quoted as saying, "Pharmaceutical diversion is kind of funny because it's going on in every community, but it appears not to exist unless you go after it purposely."

== DEA investigation into oxycodone diversion ==
According to the US Justice Department, in 2011 CVS pharmacies in Sanford, Florida, ordered enough painkillers to supply a population eight times its size. Sanford has a population of 53,000 but the supply would support 400,000. According to the Drug Enforcement Administration (DEA), in 2010 a single CVS pharmacy in Sanford ordered 1.8 million oxycodone pills, an average of 137,994 pills a month. Other pharmacy customers in Florida averaged 5,364 oxycodone pills a month. DEA investigators serving a warrant to a CVS pharmacy in Sanford on October 18, 2011 noted that "approximately every third car that came through the drive-thru lane had prescriptions for oxycodone or hydrocodone."

According to the DEA, a pharmacist at that location stated to investigators that "her customers often requested certain brands of oxycodone using street slang," an indicator that the drugs were being diverted and not used for legitimate pain management. In response, CVS in a statement issued February 17 in response to opioid trafficking questions from USA Today said the company is committed to working with the DEA and had taken "significant actions to ensure appropriate dispensing of painkillers in Florida."

In February 2012, Joseph Rannazzisi, chief of the Drug Enforcement Administration’s Office of Diversion Control, issued immediate suspension orders against Cardinal Health's supply of oxycodone to suspected pill mills. Deputy Attorney General James M. Cole then called Rannazzisi to a meeting at Justice Department headquarters where Cole warned him “it made good sense to listen to what Cardinal had to say”. Rannazzisi was fired from the drug diversion office in August 2015. Cardinal was never fined.

Cardinal, alongside McKesson Corporation and AmerisourceBergen, spent $13 million lobbying Congress to pass Congressman Tom Marino's "Ensuring Patient Access and Effective Drug Enforcement Act". The bill, which increases the burden of proof enforcers need to show against drug distributors, was signed into law by President Barack Obama in April 2016.

== See also ==
- Diversion (disambiguation)
- Unused drug
- Oxycodone
- Pharmaceuticals in India
- Steroids
