= Weapons diversion =

Weapons going to unintended users

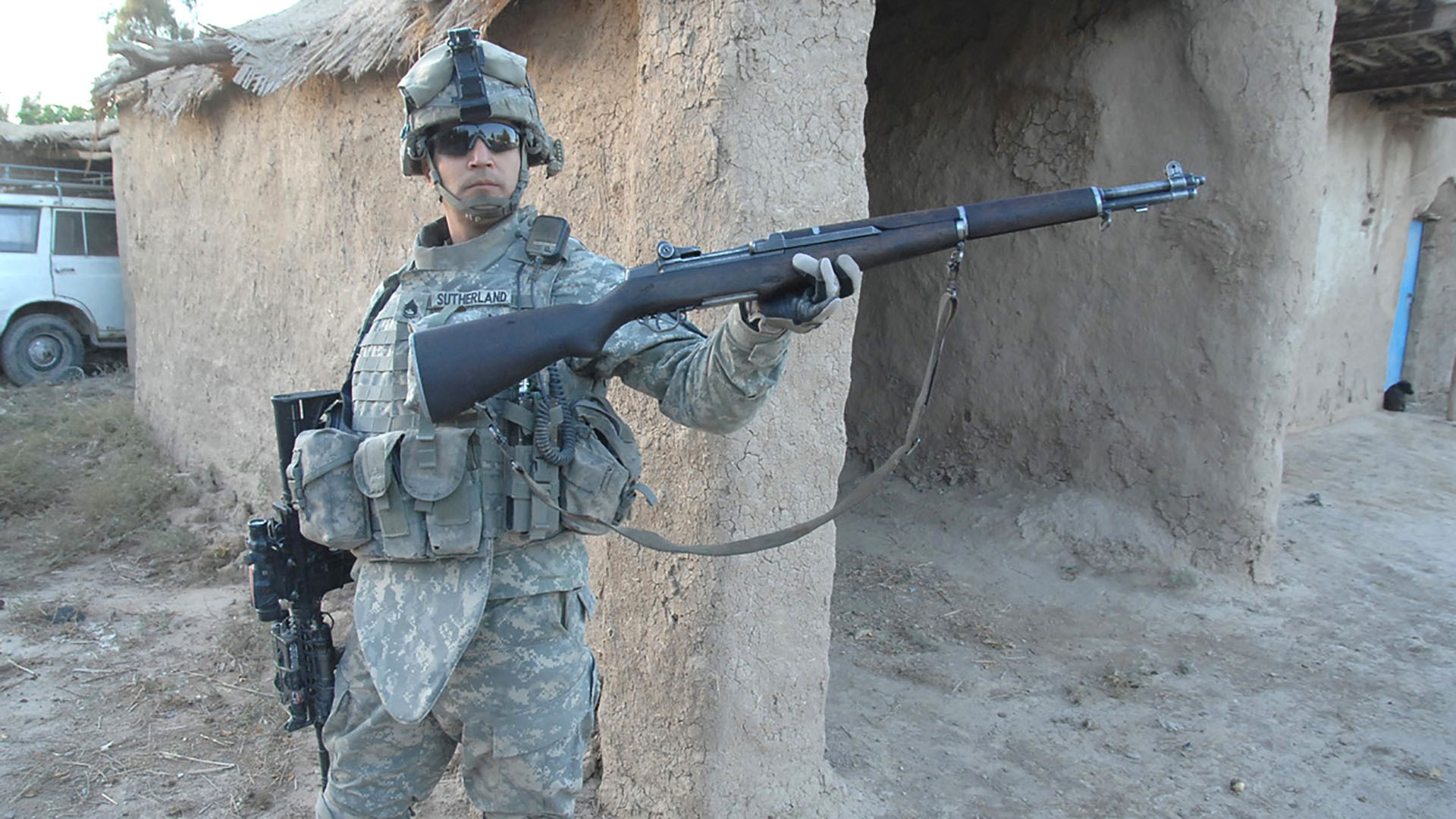
A U.S. soldier posing with an M1 Garand rifle captured in Iraq, 2007.

Weapons diversion is a situation in which weapons and ammunition are taken from their originally intended recipients. This can include equipment originally intended for use by the armed forces of one country being sold to a different country, but the most common cause of weapons diversion involves the capture of weapons during warfare. Weapons diversion can contribute to arms trafficking and other forms of organized crime.

== Battlefield capture ==
Across 321 cases involving 183 weapons and 3,600 rounds of ammunition, Conflict Armament Research found that 30% of all weapons diversions were due to battlefield capture. Of the weapons captured, 16% had been manufactured within the last eight years, meaning that diversion can occur within just a few years of the initial manufacture and export.

== End user certificates ==
Forged or corrupted End-user certificates (EUCs) are utilized by arms smugglers to supply weaponry to sanctioned governments and non-state armed groups. A 1993 EUC for 800 Uzi submachine guns, 5,000 machine pistols, and over 10.0 million rounds of ammunition from Austria and the Czech Republic was signed by the Panamanian Consulate in Barcelona, Spain. According to investigators, the recipient (listed as Panama) was actually the Army of the Republic of Bosnia and Herzegovina.

== Prevention ==
The prevention of weapons diversion was a significant part of the 2014 Arms Trade Treaty. As part of the treaty, signatories are required to implement mitigation measures in arms sales and assess the likelihood of diversion.
