= List of opioids =

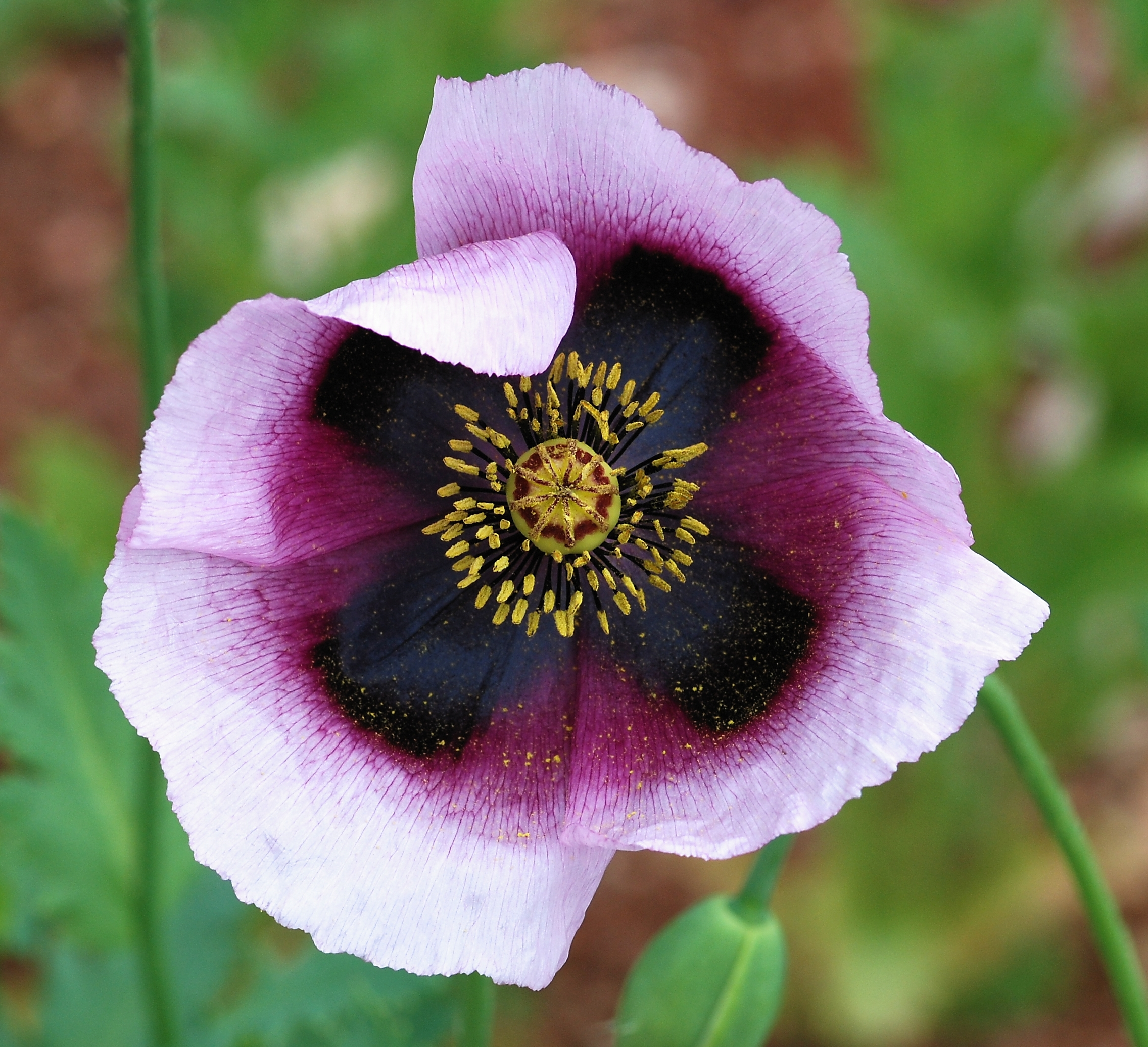
Opium poppy (Papaver somniferum) flower

This is a list of opioids, opioid antagonists and inverse agonists.

== Opium and poppy straw derivatives ==
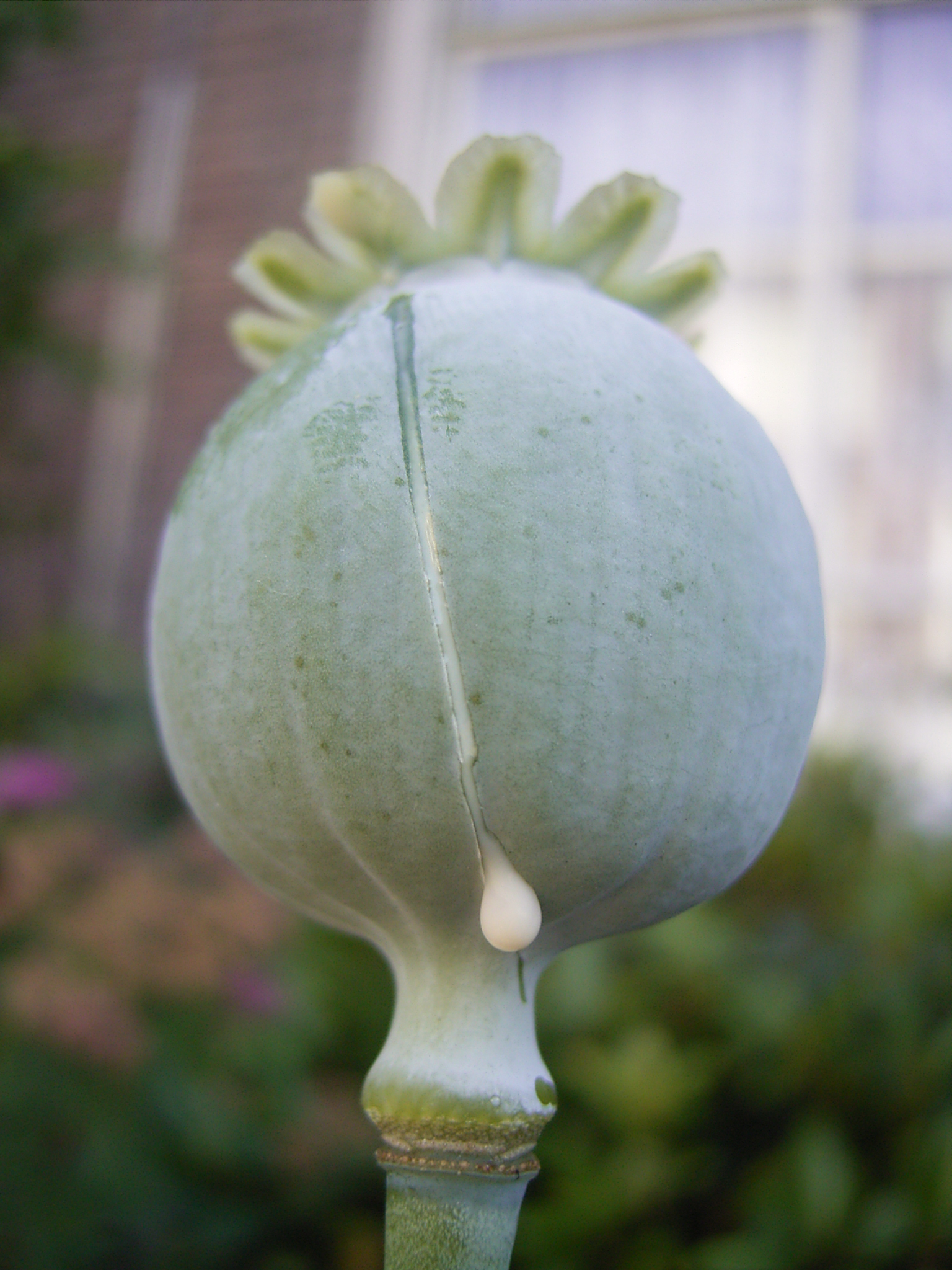
Seedhead of opium poppy with white latex

=== Crude opiate extracts whole opium products ===
- B&O Supprettes
- Diascordium
- Dover's powder
- Kendal Black Drop
- Laudanum
- Mithridate
- Opium
- Polish heroin (Compote, Kompot)
- Paregoric
- Poppy straw concentrate
- Poppy tea
- Smoking opium
- Theriac

=== Natural opiates ===
==== Opium alkaloids ====
- Codeine
- Morphine
- Oripavine
- Pseudomorphine
- Thebaine
Structures

Morphides
Codeine	Morphine	Oripavine	Pseudomorphine	Thebaine

==== Alkaloid salts mixtures ====
- Pantopon
- Papaveretum (Omnopon)
- Tetrapon

=== Semisynthetics including Bentley compounds ===
==== Morphine family ====
- 14-Hydroxymorphine
- 2,4-Dinitrophenylmorphine
- 6-Methyldihydromorphine
- 6-Methylenedihydrodesoxymorphine
- 6-Acetyldihydromorphine
- Azidomorphine
- Chlornaltrexamine
- Chloroxymorphamine
- Desomorphine (dihydrodesoxymorphine)
- Dihydromorphine
- Ethyldihydromorphine
- Hydromorphinol
- Methyldesorphine
- Morphine methylbromide
- N-Phenethylnordesomorphine
- N-Phenethyl-14-ethoxymetopon
- N-Phenethylnormorphine
- 6-Nicotinoyldihydromorphine (metabolite of nicodicodeine)
- RAM-378
- Ro4-1539
Structures of Morphine family

Morphine family
14-Hydroxymorphine	2,4-Dinitrophenylmorphine	6-Methyldihydromorphine	6-Methylenedihydrodesoxymorphine	6-Acetyldihydromorphine
Azidomorphine	Chlornaltrexamine	Chloroxymorphamine	Desomorphine (Dihydrodesoxymorphine)	Dihydromorphine
Ethyldihydromorphine	Hydromorphinol	Methyldesorphine	N-Phenethylnormorphine	6-nicotinoyldihydromorphine
RAM-378

==== 3,6-diesters of morphine ====
- Acetylpropionylmorphine
- 3,6-Dibutanoylmorphine
- Diacetyldihydromorphine (dihydroheroin, acetylmorphinol)
- Dibutyrylmorphine
- Dibenzoylmorphine (first designer drug)
- Diformylmorphine
- Dipropanoylmorphine
- Heroin (diacetylmorphine)
- Nicomorphine
Structures

3,6-diesters of morphine
Acetylpropionylmorphine	3,6-Dibutanoylmorphine	Diacetyldihydromorphine (dihydroheroin, acetylmorphinol)
Dibutyrylmorphine	Dibenzoylmorphine	Diformylmorphine
Dipropanoylmorphine	Heroin (diacetylmorphine)	Nicomorphine

==== Codeine-dionine family ====
- 6-Monoacetylcodeine
- Benzylmorphine
- Codeine methylbromide
- Desocodeine
- Dimethylmorphine (6-O-Methylcodeine)
- Ethyldihydromorphine
- Methyldihydromorphine (dihydroheterocodeine)
- Ethylmorphine (dionine)
- Heterocodeine
- Isocodeine
- Pholcodine (morpholinylethylmorphine)
- Myrophine
- Thebacon
- Transisocodeine
Structures

Codeine-dionine family
6-Monoacetylcodeine	Benzylmorphine	Codeine methylbromide	Desocodeine	Dimethylmorphine (6-O-Methylcodeine)
Ethyldihydromorphine	Methyldihydromorphine (dihydroheterocodeine)	Ethylmorphine	Heterocodeine	Isocodeine
Pholcodine	Myrophine	Transisocodeine		

==== Morphinones and morphols ====
- 14-Cinnamoyloxycodeinone
- 14-Ethoxymetopon
- 14-Methoxymetopon
- 14-Phenylpropoxymetopon
- 3-Acetyloxymorphone
- 3,14-Diacetyloxymorphone
- 7-Spiroindanyloxymorphone
- 8,14-Dihydroxydihydromorphinone
- Acetylcodone
- Acetylmorphone
- α-hydrocodol (=dihydrocodeine,)
- Benzhydrocodone
- Bromoisopropropyldihydromorphinone cas?
- Codeinone
- Codoxime
- Conorfone (codorphone)
- IBNtxA
- Thebacon (acetyldihydrocodeinone, dihydrocodeinone enol acetate)
- Hydrocodone
- Hydromorphone
- Hydroxycodeine
- Metopon (=methyldihydromorphinone)
- Morphenol
- Morphinone
- Morphol
- N-Phenethyl-14-ethoxymetopon
- Noroxymorphone
- Oxycodone
- Oxymorphol
- Oxymorphone
- Pentamorphone
- Semorphone
- 14-Hydroxycodeine
Structures

Morphinones and morphols
14-Cinnamoyloxycodeinone	14-Ethoxymetopon	14-Methoxymetopon	14-Phenylpropoxymetopon	7-Spiroindanyloxymorphone
8,14-Dihydroxydihydromorphinone	Acetylcodone	Acetylmorphone	α-hydrocodol (Dihydrocodeine)	Bromoisopropropyldihydromorphinone
Codeinone	Codorphone	Codol (Codeine Phosphate)	Codoxime	IBNtxA
Thebacon	Hydrocodone	Hydromorphone	Hydroxycodeine	Metopon (methyldihydromorphinone)
Morphenol	Morphinone	Morphol	N-Phenethyl-14-ethoxymetopon	Oxycodone
Oxymorphol	Oxymorphone	Pentamorphone	Semorphone	

==== Morphides ====
- α-Chlorocodide (= chlorocodide)
- β-Chlorocodide
- α-Chloromorphide (= chloromorphide)
- Bromocodide
- Bromomorphide
- Chlorodihydrocodide
- Chloromorphide
- Codide
Structures

Morphides
α-chlorocodide	β-chlorocodide	Bromomorphide
Chlorodihydrocodide.	Chloromorphide	Codide

==== Dihydrocodeine series ====
- 14-Hydroxydihydrocodeine
- Acetyldihydrocodeine
- Dihydrocodeine
- Dihydrodesoxycodeine (desocodeine)
- Dihydroisocodeine
- Nicocodeine
- Nicodicodeine
Structures

Morphides
14-Hydroxydihydrocodeine	Acetyldihydrocodeine	Dihydrocodeine	Dihydrodesoxycodeine
Dihydroisocodeine	Nicocodeine	Nicodicodeine	

==== Nitrogen morphine derivatives ====
- 1-Nitrocodeine cas?
- Codeine-N-oxide
- Morphine-N-oxide
Structures

Morphides
1-Nitrocodeine	Codeine-N-oxide	Morphine-N-oxide

==== Hydrazones ====
- Oxymorphazone
Structures

Hydrazones
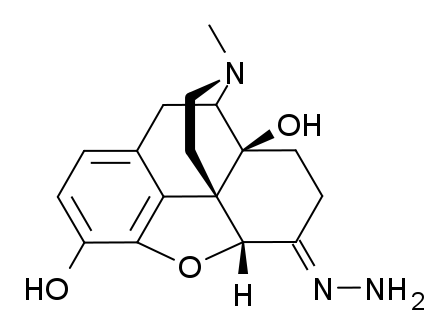
Oxymorphazone

==== Halogenated morphine derivatives ====
- 1-Bromocodeine
- 1-Chlorocodeine
- 1-Iodomorphine
Structures

Other open chain opioids
1-Bromocodeine	1-Chlorocodeine	1-Iodomorphine

=== Active opiate metabolites ===
- Codeine-6-glucuronide
- Codeine-N-oxide (genocodeine)
- Heroin-7,8-oxide
- Morphine-6-glucuronide
- 3-Monoacetylmorphine
- 6-Monoacetylmorphine
- Morphine-N-oxide (genomorphine)
- Naltrexol
- Norcodeine
- Normorphine
Structures

Active opiate metabolites
Codeine-N-oxide	Heroin-7,8-oxide	Morphine-6-glucuronide	6-Monoacetylmorphine
Morphine-N-oxide	Naltrexol	Norcodeine	Normorphine

== Morphinans ==
Levomethorphan

=== Morphinan series ===
- 3-Hydroxymorphinan
- 4-Chlorophenylpyridomorphinan
- Cyclorphan
- Levargorphan
- Levorphanol
- Levophenacylmorphan
- Levomethorphan
- Methorphan (racemethorphan)
- Morphanol (racemorphanol)
- Norlevorphanol
- N-Methylmorphinan
- Oxilorphan
- Phenomorphan
- Proxorphan
- Ro4-1539
- Stephodeline Xorphanol
Structures

Other morphinans
4-chlorophenylpyridomorphinan	Cyclorphan	Dextrallorphan	Levargorphan	Levophenacylmorphan
Levomethorphan	Norlevorphanol	N-Methylmorphinan	Oxilorphan	Phenomorphan
Dextromethorphan levomethorphan	Morphanol	Ro4-1539	Stephodeline	Xorphanol

=== Others ===
- 1-Nitroaknadinine * 14-episinomenine
- 5,6-Dihydronorsalutaridine
- 6-Keto Nalbuphine
- Aknadinine
- Butorphanol
- Cephakicine
- Cephasamine
- Cyprodime
- Drotebanol
- Fenfangjine G
- Ketorfanol
- Nalbuphine
- Nalbuphone
- Tannagine
Structures

Other Morphinans
1-Nitroaknadinine	14-episinomenine	5,6-Dihydronorsalutaridine	6-Keto Nalbuphine	Aknadinine
Butorphanol	Cephakicine	Cephasamine	Cyprodime	Drotebanol
Fenfangjine G	Nalbuphine	Sinococuline	Sinomenine	Tannagine

== Benzomorphans ==
- 5,9 alpha-diethyl-2-hydroxybenzomorphan (5,9-DEHB)
- 8-Carboxamidocyclazocine (8-CAC)
- Alazocine
- Anazocine
- Bremazocine
- Butinazocine
- Carbazocine
- Cogazocine
- Cyclazocine
- Dezocine
- Eptazocine
- Etazocine
- Ethylketazocine
- Fedotozine
- Fluorophen
- Gemazocine
- Ibazocine
- Ketazocine
- Metazocine
- Moxazocine
- Pentazocine
- Phenazocine
- Quadazocine
- SKF-10047
- Tonazocine
- Volazocine
- Zenazocine
Structures

Benzomorphans
5,9 alpha-diethyl-2-hydroxybenzomorphan (5,9-DEHB)	8-Carboxamidocyclazocine	Alazocine	Anazocine	Bremazocine
Butinazocine	Carbazocine	Cogazocine	Cyclazocine	Dezocine
Eptazocine	Etazocine	Ethylketocyclazocine	Fedotozine	Fluorophen
Gemazocine	Ibazocine	Ketazocine	Metazocine	Moxazocine
Pentazocine	Phenazocine	Quadazocine	Tonazocine	
Volazocine	Zenazocine			

== 4-Phenylpiperidines ==
Pethidine

=== Pethidines (meperidines) ===
- 4-Fluoropethidine
- Allylnorpethidine
- Anileridine
- Benzethidine
- Carperidine
- Difenoxin
- Diphenoxylate
- Etoxeridine (carbetidine)
- Furethidine
- Hydroxypethidine (bemidone)
- Morpheridine
- Meperidine-N-oxide
- Oxpheneridine (carbamethidine)
- Pethidine (meperidine)
- Pethidine intermediate A
- Pethidine intermediate B (norpethidine)
- Pethidine intermediate C (pethidinic acid)
- Pheneridine
- Phenoperidine
- Piminodine
- Properidine (ipropethidine)
- Sameridine
Structures

Pethidines (meperidines)
4-Fluoropethidine	8-Carboxamidocyclazocine	Allylnorpethidine	Anileridine	Benzethidine
Carperidine	Difenoxin	Diphenoxylate	Etoxeridine	Furethidine
Hydroxypethidine	Morpheridine	Meperidine-N-oxide	Oxpheneridine	Pethidine
Pethidine intermediate A	Pethidine intermediate B	Pethidine intermediate C	Pheneridine	Phenoperidine
Piminodine	Properidine	Sameridine		

=== Prodines ===
- Allylprodine
- (α/β)-Meprodine
- Desmethylprodine (MPPP)
- PEPAP
- (α/β)-Prodine
- Prosidol
- Trimeperidine (promedol)
Structures

Prodines
Allylprodine	(α/β)-Meprodine	Desmethylprodine (MPPP)	PEPAP	Prodine
Prosidol	Prosidol			

=== Ketobemidones ===
- Acetoxyketobemidone
- Droxypropine
- Ketobemidone
- Methylketobemidone
- Propylketobemidone
Structures

Ketobemidones
Acetoxyketobemidone	Droxypropine	Ketobemidone	Methylketobemidone	Propylketobemidone

=== Others ===
- Alvimopan
- Loperamide
- LS-115509
- Picenadol
Structures

Other phenylpiperidines
Alvimopan	Loperamide	LS-115509	Picenadol

== Open chain opioids ==
Methadone

=== Amidones ===
- Dextromethadone
- Dipipanone
- Dipyanone
- Isomethadone
- Levoisomethadone
- Levomethadone
- Methadone
- Methadone intermediate
- Normethadone
- Norpipanone
- Phenadoxone (heptazone)
Structures

Amidones
Dextromethadone	Dipipanone	Isomethadone	Levoisomethadone
Noracetylmethadol	Levomethadone	Methadone	Methadone intermediate
Normethadone	Norpipanone	Phenadoxone	Pipidone

=== Methadols ===
- Acetylmethadol
- Alphaacetylmethadol
- Alphamethadol
- Betacetylmethadol
- Betamethadol
- Dimepheptanol (racemethadol)
- Isomethadol
- Levacetylmethadol
- Noracymethadol
Structures

Other open chain opioids
Alphaacetylmethadol	Dimepheptanol	Levacetylmethadol	Noracetylmethadol

=== Moramides ===
- Desmethylmoramide
- Dextromoramide
- Levomoramide
- Moramide intermediate
- Racemoramide
Structures

Other open chain opioids
Desmethylmoramide	Dextromoramide	Levomoramide	Moramide intermediate	Racemoramide

=== Thiambutenes ===
- Diethylthiambutene
- Dimethylthiambutene
- Ethylmethylthiambutene
- Piperidylthiambutene
- Pyrrolidinylthiambutene
- Thiambutene
Structures

Thiambutenes
Diethylthiambutene	Dimethylthiambutene	Ethylmethylthiambutene
Piperidylthiambutene	Thiambutene	Tipepidine

=== Phenalkoxams ===
- Dextropropoxyphene (propoxyphene)
- Dimenoxadol
- Dioxaphetyl butyrate
- Levopropoxyphene
- Norpropoxyphene
- Pyrroliphene
Structures

Phenalkoxams
Dextropropoxyphene (propoxyphene)	Dimenoxadol	Dioxaphetyl butyrate	Levopropoxyphene	Norpropoxyphene

=== Ampromides ===
- Diampromide
- Phenampromide
- Propiram
Structures

Ampromides
Diampromide	Phenampromide	Propiram

=== Others ===
- Embutramide
- IC-26
- Isoaminile
- Lefetamine
- R-4066
Structures

Other open chain opioids
Embutramide	IC-26	Isoaminile	Lefetamine	R-4066

== Anilidopiperidines ==
Fentanyl

- 3-Allylfentanyl
- 3-Methylfentanyl
- 3-Methylthiofentanyl
- 4-Phenylfentanyl
- Alfentanil
- α-Methylacetylfentanyl
- α-Methylfentanyl
- α-Methylthiofentanyl
- Benzylfentanyl
- β-hydroxyfentanyl
- β-hydroxythiofentanyl
- β-Methylfentanyl
- Brifentanil
- Butyrfentanyl
- Carfentanil
- Fentanyl
- Lofentanil
- N-Methylcarfentanil
- Mirfentanil
- Ocfentanil
- Ohmefentanyl
- Parafluorofentanyl
- Phenaridine
- R-30490
- Remifentanil
- Sufentanil
- Thenylfentanyl
- Thiofentanyl
- Trefentanil
Structures

Anilidopiperidines
3-Allylfentanyl	3-Methylfentanyl	3-Methylthiofentanyl	4-Phenylfentanyl	Alfentanil
Alphamethylacetylfentanyl	Alphamethylfentanyl	Alpha-methylthiofentanyl	Benzylfentanyl	Betahydroxyfentanyl
Betahydroxythiofentanyl	Betamethylfentanyl	Brifentanil	Carfentanil	Fentanyl
Lofentanil	Mirfentanil	Ocfentanil	Ohmefentanyl	Parafluorofentanyl
Phenaridine	Remifentanil	Sufentanil	Thenylfentanyl	Thiofentanyl
Trefentanil

== Oripavine derivatives ==
Thienorphine

- 7-PET
- Acetorphine
- Alletorphine (N-allyl-noretorphine)
- BU-48
- Buprenorphine
- Buprenorphine-3-glucuronide
- Cyprenorphine
- Dihydroetorphine
- Etorphine
- Homprenorphine
- 18,19-Dehydrobuprenorphine (HS-599)
- N-cyclopropylmethylnoretorphine
- Nepenthone
- Norbuprenorphine
- Norbuprenorphine-3-glucuronide
- Thevinone
- Thienorphine
- TH-030418
Structures

Oripavine derivatives
7-PET	Acetorphine	Alletorphine	BU-48	Buprenorphine
Cyprenorphine	Dihydroetorphine	Etorphine	Homprenorphine	18,19-Dehydrobuprenorphine
N-cyclopropylmethylnoretorphine	Nepenthone	Norbuprenorphine	Thevinone	Thienorphine

== Phenazepanes ==
- Ethoheptazine
- Meptazinol
- Metheptazine
- Metethoheptazine
- Proheptazine
Structures

Phenazepanes
Ethoheptazine	Meptazinol	Metheptazine	Metethoheptazine	Proheptazine

== Pirinitramides ==
- Bezitramide
- Piritramide
Structures

Pirinitramides
Bezitramide	Piritramide

== Benzimidazoles ==
- Clonitazene
- Etonitazene
- Isotonitazene
- Metonitazene
Structures

Benzimidazoles
Clonitazene	Etonitazene	Isotonitazene	Metonitazene	Nitazene: R = hydrogen

== Indoles ==
- 18-Methoxycoronaridine
- 7-Acetoxymitragynine
- 7-Hydroxymitragynine
- ψ-Akuammigine
- Akuammidine
- Akuammine
- Coronaridine
- Eseroline
- Hodgkinsine
- Ibogaine
- Mitragynine
- Mitragynine pseudoindoxyl
- MGM-15
- Noribogaine
- Pericine
- Pseudoakuammigine
Structures

Indoles
18-Methoxycoronaridine	7-Acetoxymitragynine	7-Hydroxymitragynine	Akuammidine	Akuammine
Eseroline	Hodgkinsine	Mitragynine	Pericine	Pseudoakuammigine

== Beta-amino ketones ==
- 3-(dimethylamino)-2,2-dimethyl-1-phenylpropan-1-one
Structures

Beta-amino ketones

3-(dimethylamino)-2,2-dimethyl-1-phenylpropan-1-one (Beta-amine ketone 'compound 29')

== Diphenylmethylpiperazines ==
- BW373U86
- DPI-221
- DPI-287
- DPI-3290
- SNC-80
- AZD-2327
Structures

Diphenylmethylpiperazines
BW373U86	DPI-221	DPI-287	DPI-3290	SNC-80

== Opioid peptides ==
β-neoendorphin

=== Dynorphins ===
- Big dynorphin
- Dynorphin A
- Dynorphin B
- Leumorphin
Structures

Dynorphins
Big dynorphin	Dynorphin A	Dynorphin B

=== Endomorphins ===
- Endomorphin-1
- Endomorphin-2

=== Endorphins ===
- α-Endorphin
- β-Endorphin
- γ-Endorphin
- α-Neoendorphin
- β-Neoendorphin
Structures

Dynorphins
Alpha-endorphin	Beta-endorphin	Gamma-endorphin	α-neoendorphin	β-neoendorphin

=== Enkephalins ===
- DADLE
- DAMGO
- Deltorphin
- Met-enkephalin
- Leu-enkephalin
Structures

Enkephalins
DADLE	DAMGO	Deltorphin	Met-enkephalin	Leu-enkephalin

=== Propeptides ===
- Proenkephalin
- Proendorphin
- Proopiomelanocortin

=== Others / unknown ===
- Adrenorphin
- Amidorphin
- Biphalin
- Casokefamide
- Casomorphins
- Cytochrophin-4
- DALDA (Tyr-D-Arg-Phe-Lys-NH_{2})
- Deltorphin I
- Deltorphin II
- Deprolorphin
- Dermorphin
- DPDPE
- Frakefamide
- Gliadorphin
- Gluten exorphins
- Hemorphin-4
- Metkefamide
- Morphiceptin
- Nociceptin
- Octreotide
- Opiorphin
- Rubiscolin
- Soymorphins
- Spinorphin
- TRIMU 5
- Tynorphin
- Valorphin
- Zyklophin
Structures

Other or unknown opioid peptides
Adrenorphin	Amidorphin	Casomorphin	DALDA	Deltorphin
Dermorphin	DPDPE	Endomorphin-1 Endomorphin-2	Gliadorphin	Morphiceptin
Nociceptin	Octreotide	Opiorphin	Rubiscolin	TRIMU 5

== Others ==
- 3-(3-Methoxyphenyl)-3-ethoxycarbonyltropane
- AD-1211
- AH-7921
- Axomadol
- Azaprocin
- BDPC
- Bisnortilidine
- BRL-52537
- Bromadol
- Bromadoline
- Ciprefadol
- Ciramadol
- Doxpicomine
- Enadoline
- Faxeladol
- GR-89696
- Herkinorin
- ICI-199,441
- ICI-204,448
- Ketamine
- KNT-42
- LPK-26
- Lufuradom
- Metofoline
- MT-45
- Desmethylclozapine
- Nexeridine
- NNC 63-0532
- Nortilidine
- O-Desmethyltramadol
- Phenadone
- Phencyclidine
- Prodilidine
- Profadol
- Ro64-6198
- Salvinorin A
- Salvinorin B ethoxymethyl ether
- Salvinorin B methoxymethyl ether
- SB-612,111
- SC-17599
- RWJ-394,674
- TAN-67
- Tapentadol
- Thiobromadol (C-8813)
- Tifluadom
- Tilidine
- Tramadol
- Trimebutine
- U-47700
- U-50,488
- U-69,593
- Viminol
- 1-(4-Nitrophenylethyl)piperidylidene-2-(4-chlorophenyl)sulfonamide (W-18)

== Opioid antagonists and inverse agonists ==
- 4-Caffeoyl-1,5-quinide
- 5'-Guanidinonaltrindole
- β-Funaltrexamine
- 6β-Naltrexol
- 6β-Naltrexol-d4
- Alvimopan
- AT-076
- Binaltorphimine
- BU09059
- Buprenorphine
- Chlornaltrexamine
- Clocinnamox
- Cyclazocine
- Cyprodime
- Diacetylnalorphine
- Diprenorphine (M5050)
- Fedotozine
- ICI-174864
- J-113,397
- JDTic
- JTC-801
- Levallorphan
- LY-2456302
- LY-255582
- Methocinnamox
- Methylnaltrexone
- ML350
- Naldemedine
- Nalfurafine
- Nalmefene
- Nalmexone
- Nalodeine (N-allylnorcodeine)
- Naloxazone
- Naloxegol
- Naloxol
- Naloxonazine
- Naloxone
- Naloxone benzoylhydrazone
- Nalorphine
- Naltrexone
- Naltriben
- Naltrindole
- Norbinaltorphimine
- Oxilorphan
- PF-4455242
- S-allyl-3-hydroxy-17-thioniamorphinan (SAHTM)
- Samidorphan
- SR-16430

== Biased ligands ==
- 6'-Guanidinonaltrindole
- 7-Hydroxymitragynine
- Herkinorin
- ICI-199,441
- Noribogaine
- Oliceridine
- RB-64
- TRV734
- SR-17018
- SR-14968

== Receptor heteromer targeting ligands ==
- 6'-GNTI (δ-κ)
- CYM-51010 (δ-μ)
- NNTA (κ-μ)
- IBNtxA (μ1G-NOP)

== Uncategorized opioids ==
- ADL-5859
- Alimadol
- Amentoflavone
- Anilopam +HCl
- Asimadoline
- Cyproterone acetate
- FE 200665
- Fedotozine
- HZ-2
- Kolokol-1
- Matrine
- MCOPPB
- Menthol
- MT-7716
- Nalfurafine
- Nalorphine
- Nalorphine dinicotinate
- PZM21
- Proglumide
- Ro65-6570
- SoRI-9409
- Spiradoline
- SR-8993
- SR-16435
Structures

Uncategorized opioids
Alimadol	Anilopam	Asimadoline	
FE 200665	Fedotozine	MCOPPB	
Nalfurafine	Nalodeine	Nalorphine	Nalorphine dinicotinate
SoRI-9409			

== Combination drug formulations containing opioids ==
- Buprenorphine/naloxone
- Buprenorphine/samidorphan (ALKS-5461)
- Co-codamol (codeine phosphate/paracetamol)
- Co-codaprin (codeine phosphate/aspirin)
- Co-dydramol (dihydrocodeine tartrate/paracetamol)
- Co-proxamol (dextropropoxyphene/paracetamol)
- Fentanyl/fluanisone
- Hydrocodone/ibuprofen
- Hydrocodone/paracetamol
- Loperamide/simethicone
- Morphine/naltrexone
- Naltrexone/bupropion
- Oxycodone/aspirin
- Oxycodone/naloxone
- Oxycodone/paracetamol

== See also ==
- List of opioids by visual 2D molecular skeletal renderings (bundled remotely, click "show" after following link)
- List of Schedule I drugs (US)
- Gray death
