= C18H23NO2 =

The molecular formula C_{18}H_{23}NO_{2} (molar mass: 285.39 g/mol, exact mass: 285.1728 u) may refer to:

- Butinazocine
- Desocodeine
- 2,5-Dimethoxy-4-benzylamphetamine
- Ketazocine, or ketocyclazocine
- Medrylamine
