= C17H23NO2 =

The molecular formula C_{17}H_{23}NO_{2} (molar mass: 273.37 g/mol) may refer to:

- Allylnorpethidine (WIN-7681)
- 5-DBFPV
- RTI-32
- Tilidine
- Tropanserin
