= C23H30N2O =

The molecular formula C_{23}H_{30}N_{2}O may refer to:

- AD-1211
- Butyrfentanyl
- Isobutyrylfentanyl
- α-Methylfentanyl
- β-Methylfentanyl
- 3-Methylfentanyl
