= C19H24BrNO3 =

The molecular formula C_{19}H_{24}BrNO_{3} may refer to:

- Codeine methylbromide
- DOB-NBOMe
