= Dimethylaminopivalophenone =

Opioid analgesic drug

Identifiers
- IUPAC name: 3-(dimethylamino)-2,2-dimethyl-1-phenylpropan-1-one
- CAS Number: 15451-29-3
- PubChem CID: 84922
- ChemSpider: 76610
- UNII: 83LLR55ETP
- CompTox Dashboard (EPA): DTXSID90165652

Chemical and physical data
- Formula: C_{13}H_{19}NO
- Molar mass: 205.301 g·mol^{−1}
- 3D model (JSmol): Interactive image
- SMILES: CN(CC(C(=O)C1=CC=CC=C1)(C)C)C
- InChI: InChI=1S/C13H19NO/c1-13(2,10-14(3)4)12(15)11-8-6-5-7-9-11/h5-9H,10H2,1-4H3; Key:WKJYCZMXCFRIEO-UHFFFAOYSA-N

Dimethylaminopivalophenone is an opioid analgesic with a potency ½ that of morphine. It was initially discovered by Russian scientists in 1954 and subsequently rediscovered in the US in 1969. Its LD_{50} in mice is 83 mg/kg. It has never been marketed commercially.

== See also ==
- Tapentadol
- List of opioids
- Opioid#Table of non-morphinan opioids
