= Semorphone =

Chemical compound

Clinical data
- ATC code: none

Identifiers
- IUPAC name: (5α)-4,5-Epoxy-3,14-dihydroxy-17-(2-methoxyethyl)morphinan-6-one
- CAS Number: 88939-40-6
- PubChem CID: 5491906
- ChemSpider: 4590760
- UNII: 2HD55617I2
- CompTox Dashboard (EPA): DTXSID00933465

Chemical and physical data
- Formula: C_{19}H_{23}NO_{5}
- Molar mass: 345.395 g·mol^{−1}
- 3D model (JSmol): Interactive image
- SMILES: O=C4[C@@H]5Oc1c2c(ccc1O)C[C@H]3N(CC[C@]25[C@@]3(O)CC4)CCOC
- InChI: InChI=1S/C19H23NO5/c1-24-9-8-20-7-6-18-15-11-2-3-12(21)16(15)25-17(18)13(22)4-5-19(18,23)14(20)10-11/h2-3,14,17,21,23H,4-10H2,1H3/t14-,17+,18+,19-/m1/s1; Key:PBGIBLLOMGURPS-GRGSLBFTSA-N

Semorphone (Mr 2264) is an opiate analogue that is an N-substituted derivative of oxymorphone.

Semorphone is a partial agonist at μ-opioid receptors. It is around twice the potency of morphine, but with a ceiling effect on both analgesia and respiratory depression which means that these effects stop becoming any stronger after a certain maximum dose.

It is not currently used in medicine, and is not a controlled drug, although it might be considered to be a controlled substance analogue of oxymorphone on the grounds of its related chemical structure in some jurisdictions such as the United States, Canada, Australia and New Zealand.
