= Prosidol =

Chemical compound

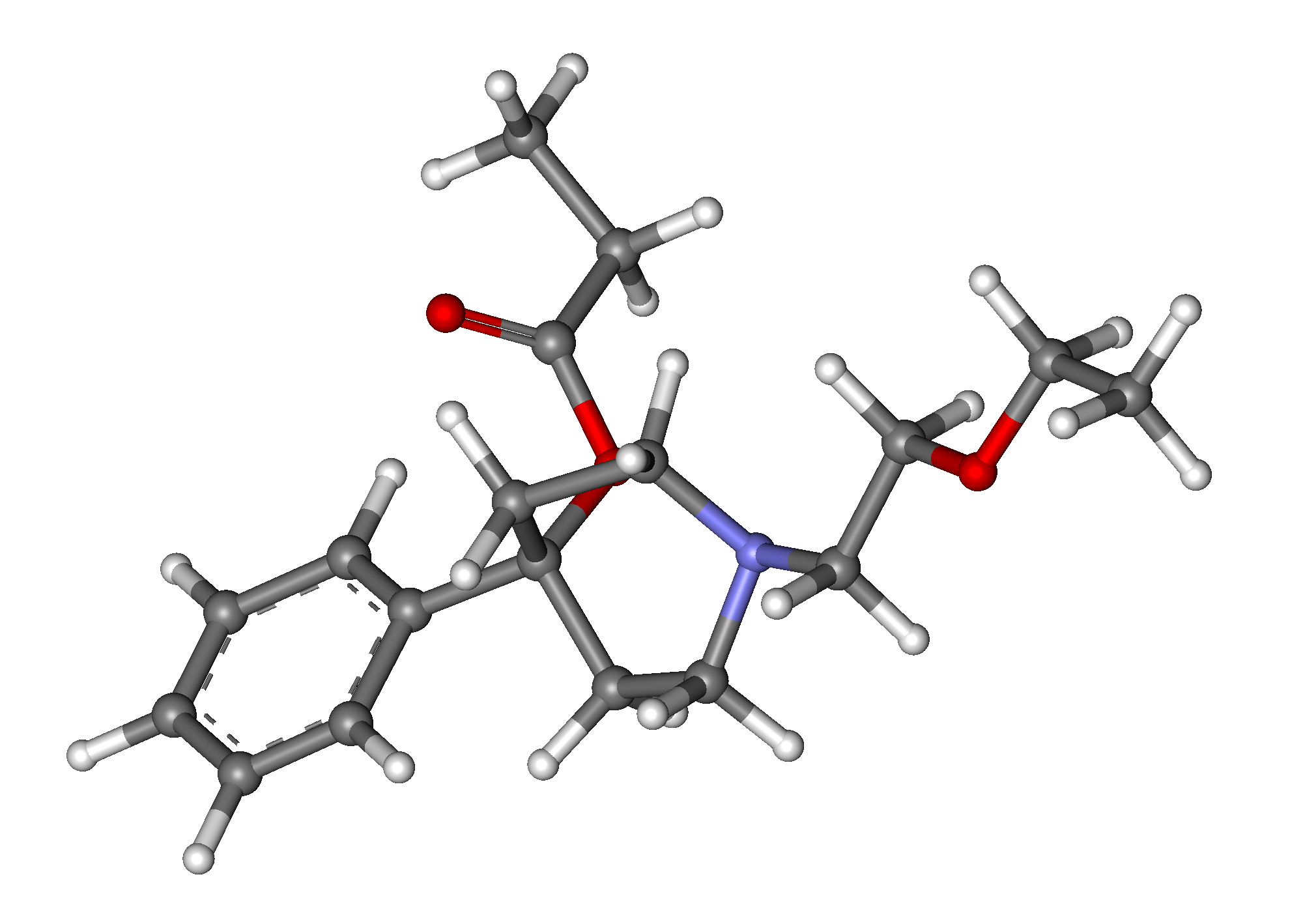

Clinical data
- ATC code: none

Identifiers
- IUPAC name: 1-(2-ethoxyethyl)-4-phenylpiperidin-4-yl propionate
- CAS Number: 164231-04-3
- PubChem CID: 10402849
- ChemSpider: 8578287
- UNII: CV69EOR0N2

Chemical and physical data
- Formula: C_{18}H_{27}NO_{3}
- Molar mass: 305.418 g·mol^{−1}
- 3D model (JSmol): Interactive image
- SMILES: O=C(OC2(c1ccccc1)CCN(CCOCC)CC2)CC
- InChI: InChI=1S/C18H27NO3/c1-3-17(20)22-18(16-8-6-5-7-9-16)10-12-19(13-11-18)14-15-21-4-2/h5-9H,3-4,10-15H2,1-2H3; Key:IOLPYQBYMPDUNK-UHFFFAOYSA-N

Prosidol is an opioid analgesic that is an analogue of prodine. It was originally discovered by J.F. MacFarlan and Co. in the 1950s. It was further developed in Russia in the 1990s during research into the related drug pethidine.

Prosidol has seen some clinical use, but is still a relatively new drug and does not yet have an extensive history of use. It produces similar effects to other opioids, such as analgesia and sedation, along with side effects such as nausea, itching, vomiting and respiratory depression which may be harmful or fatal.
