= 14-Hydroxydihydrocodeine =

Chemical compound

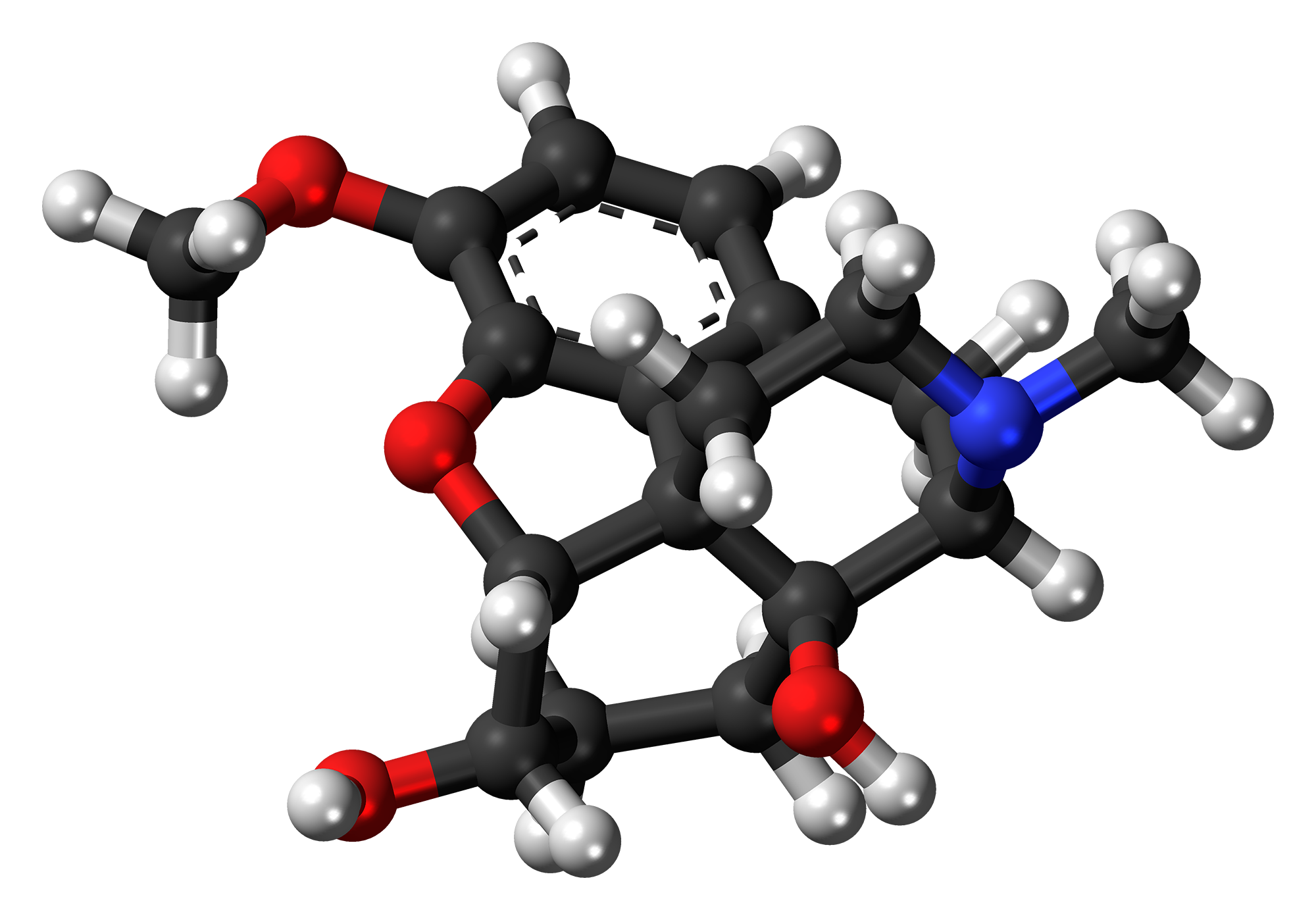

Clinical data
- Dependence liability: High

Identifiers
- IUPAC name: 3,14-dihydroxy-6-methoxy-4,5α-epoxy-17-methylmorphinan
- CAS Number: 7183-69-9
- PubChem CID: 5360241
- ChemSpider: 4514458
- UNII: 75CDM1Q08M
- CompTox Dashboard (EPA): DTXSID10222115
- ECHA InfoCard: 100.208.390

Chemical and physical data
- Formula: C_{18}H_{23}NO_{4}
- Molar mass: 317.385 g·mol^{−1}
- 3D model (JSmol): Interactive image
- SMILES: COc5ccc1CC2C4(O)CCC(O)C3Oc5c1C34CCN2C
- InChI: InChI=1S/C18H23NO4/c1-19-8-7-17-14-10-3-4-12(22-2)15(14)23-16(17)11(20)5-6-18(17,21)13(19)9-10/h3-4,11,13,16,20-21H,5-9H2,1-2H3/t11-,13+,16-,17-,18+/m0/s1; Key:LHTAJTFGGUDLRH-QMVVXIJUSA-N

14-Hydroxydihydrocodeine (RAM-318) is an opiate analgesic drug, which is also an active metabolite of oxycodone and hydromorphinol. 14-Hydroxydihydrocodeine is not currently marketed in any developed country, but has been of interest to pharmaceutical companies looking for new analgesics and antitussives.
