= Chlorodihydrocodide =

Identifiers
| CAS Number | 63690-27-7 |
| 3D model (JSmol) | Interactive image |
| ChemSpider | 4676748 |
| PubChem CID | 5745682 |
| CompTox Dashboard (EPA) | DTXSID20213094 |
- InChI: InChI=1S/C18H22ClNO2/c1-20-8-7-18-11-4-5-12(19)17(18)22-16-14(21-2)6-3-10(15(16)18)9-13(11)20/h3,6,11-13,17H,4-5,7-9H2,1-2H3/t11-,12-,13+,17-,18-/m0/s1 Key: LBXQDFZPYYNEHR-AFSSITGASA-N
- SMILES: CN1CC[C@]23c4c5ccc(c4O[C@H]2[C@H](CC[C@H]3[C@H]1C5)Cl)OC
- Except where otherwise noted, data are given for materials in their standard state (at 25 °C [77 °F], 100 kPa). Infobox references

Chlorodihydrocodide is an opioid.
