= LS-115509 =

Chemical compound

Clinical data
- ATC code: none

Identifiers
- IUPAC name: 4-ethoxy-4-(furan-2-yl)-3-methyl-1-(2-phenylethyl)piperidine
- CAS Number: 94876-55-8
- PubChem CID: 3024404
- ChemSpider: 2290335
- UNII: XG2JQX2JDJ
- CompTox Dashboard (EPA): DTXSID50915236

Chemical and physical data
- Formula: C_{20}H_{27}NO_{2}
- Molar mass: 313.441 g·mol^{−1}
- 3D model (JSmol): Interactive image
- SMILES: CCOC1(CCN(CC1C)CCC2=CC=CC=C2)C3=CC=CO3
- InChI: InChI=1S/C20H27NO2/c1-3-23-20(19-10-7-15-22-19)12-14-21(16-17(20)2)13-11-18-8-5-4-6-9-18/h4-10,15,17H,3,11-14,16H2,1-2H3; Key:INLMDDDTZIKNNI-UHFFFAOYSA-N

LS-115509 is an opioid analgesic related to the 4-phenylpiperidine family. It is comparable to drugs such as prodine and pheneridine, but is distinguished by the presence of an ether group and furan ring at the piperidine 4-position, which are not found in other drugs of this class. In animal studies, it has around 2-3x the potency of morphine depending on what assay is used. Like prodine, it has two stereocenters and four possible enantiomers, but the activity of these has not been tested separately.

== See also ==
- PEPAP
