= Cogazocine =

Chemical compound

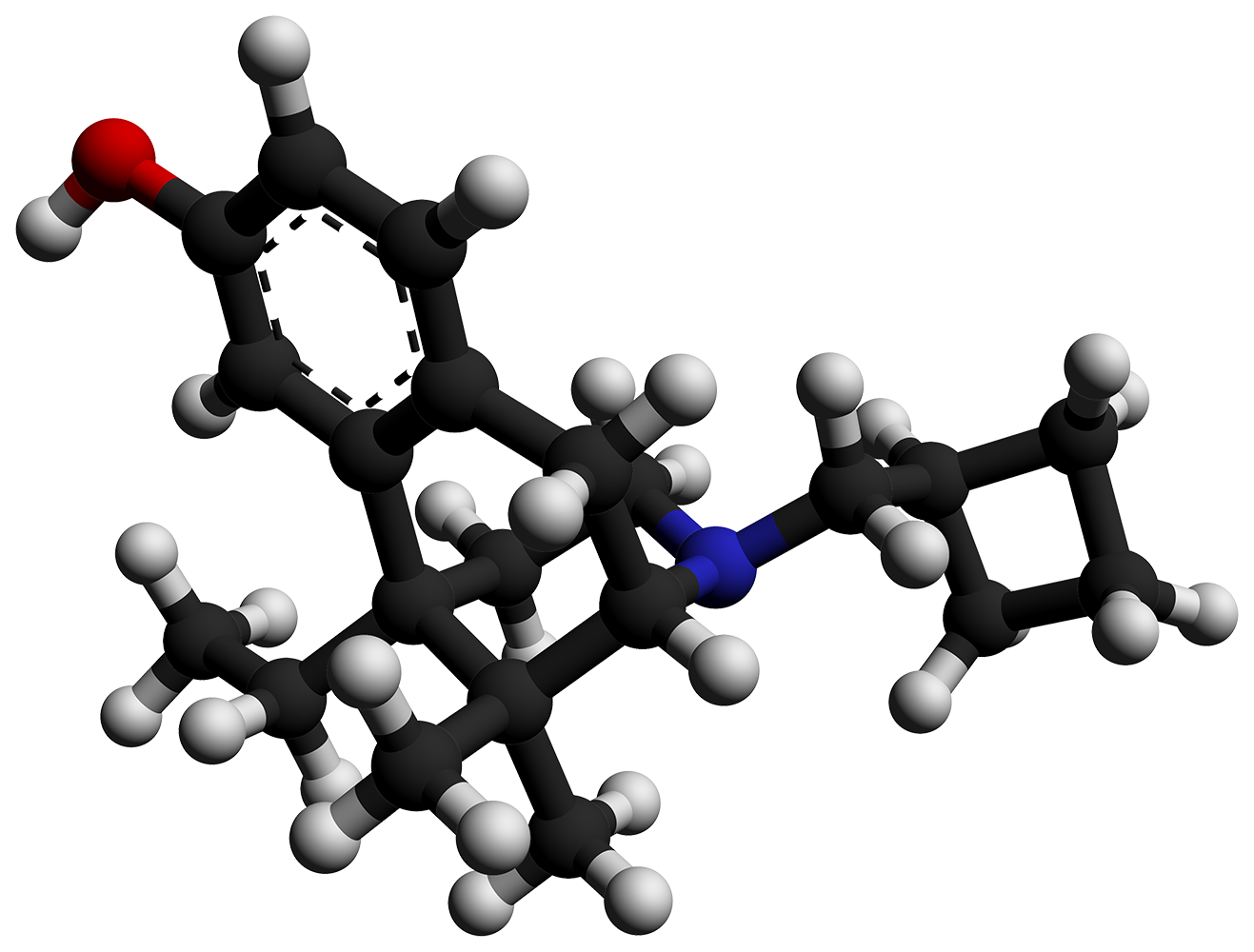

Clinical data
- ATC code: None

Identifiers
- IUPAC name: 3-(cyclobutylmethyl)-6-ethyl-11,11-dimethyl-1,2,3,4,5,6-hexahydro-2,6-methano-3-benzazocin-8-ol
- CAS Number: 57653-29-9
- PubChem CID: 198576
- ChemSpider: 171872
- UNII: 6GKB767I3M
- ChEMBL: ChEMBL2104583
- CompTox Dashboard (EPA): DTXSID80866641

Chemical and physical data
- Formula: C_{21}H_{31}NO
- Molar mass: 313.485 g·mol^{−1}
- 3D model (JSmol): Interactive image
- SMILES: Oc1ccc4c(c1)C2(C(C(N(CC2)CC3CCC3)C4)(C)C)CC
- InChI: InChI=1S/C21H31NO/c1-4-21-10-11-22(14-15-6-5-7-15)19(20(21,2)3)12-16-8-9-17(23)13-18(16)21/h8-9,13,15,19,23H,4-7,10-12,14H2,1-3H3; Key:IUUBFDSJJHOTDI-UHFFFAOYSA-N

Cogazocine (INN) is an opioid analgesic of the benzomorphan family which was never marketed.

== See also ==
- Benzomorphan
