= DPI-221 =

Chemical compound

Identifiers
- IUPAC name: 4-((αS)-α-((2S,5R)-2,5-dimethyl-4-(3-fluorobenzyl)-1-piperazinyl)benzyl)-N,N-diethylbenzamide
- CAS Number: 519058-15-2
- PubChem CID: 9891642
- ChemSpider: 8067312
- UNII: X9LJN69TFK

Chemical and physical data
- Formula: C_{31}H_{38}FN_{3}O
- Molar mass: 487.651
- 3D model (JSmol): Interactive image
- SMILES: O=C(N(CC)CC)c1ccc(cc1)[C@@H](N3C[C@H](N(Cc2cc(F)ccc2)C[C@@H]3C)C)c4ccccc4
- InChI: InChI=1S/C31H38FN3O/c1-5-33(6-2)31(36)28-17-15-27(16-18-28)30(26-12-8-7-9-13-26)35-21-23(3)34(20-24(35)4)22-25-11-10-14-29(32)19-25/h7-19,23-24,30H,5-6,20-22H2,1-4H3/t23-,24+,30+/m1/s1; Key:KEXJLZMJVOTFOY-QEGDFHJFSA-N

DPI-221 is an opioid drug that is used in scientific research. It is a highly selective agonist for the δ-opioid receptor, which produces fewer convulsions than most drugs from this family.
