= Brifentanil =

Opioid analgesic drug

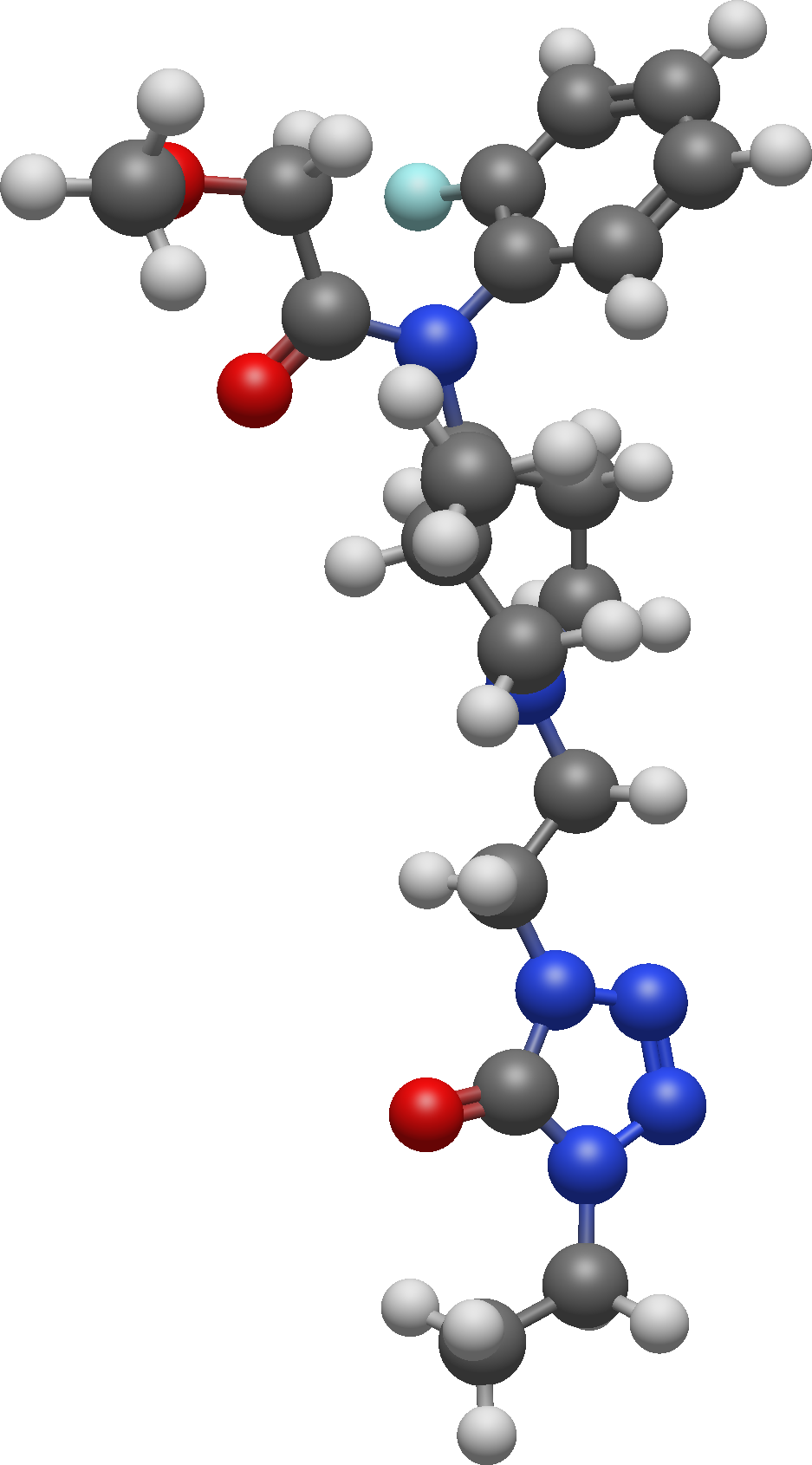

Clinical data
- Other names: Brifentanil
- ATC code: none

Identifiers
- IUPAC name: N-[(3R,4S)-1-[2-(4-Ethyl-5-oxotetrazol-1-yl)ethyl] -3-methylpiperidin-4-yl]-N-(2-fluorophenyl)-2-methoxyacetamide
- CAS Number: 101345-71-5
- PubChem CID: 60672
- DrugBank: DB09172
- ChemSpider: 54682
- UNII: 6GDT77PQBW
- ChEMBL: ChEMBL2220476
- CompTox Dashboard (EPA): DTXSID20143867

Chemical and physical data
- Formula: C_{20}H_{29}FN_{6}O_{3}
- Molar mass: 420.489 g·mol^{−1}
- 3D model (JSmol): Interactive image
- SMILES: Fc1ccccc1N(C(=O)COC)[C@H]3CCN(CCN2\N=N/N(C2=O)CC)C[C@H]3C
- InChI: InChI=1S/C20H29FN6O3/c1-4-25-20(29)26(23-22-25)12-11-24-10-9-17(15(2)13-24)27(19(28)14-30-3)18-8-6-5-7-16(18)21/h5-8,15,17H,4,9-14H2,1-3H3/t15-,17+/m1/s1; Key:KKMGCTVJCQYQPV-WBVHZDCISA-N

Brifentanil (A-3331) is an opioid analgesic that is an analogue of fentanyl and was developed in the early 1990s.

Brifentanil is most similar to highly potent, short-acting fentanyl analogues such as alfentanil. The effects of brifentanil are very similar to those of alfentanil, with strong but short lasting analgesia and sedation, and particularly notable itching and respiratory depression.

Side effects of fentanyl analogs are similar to those of fentanyl itself, which include itching, nausea and potentially serious respiratory depression, which can be life-threatening. Fentanyl analogs have killed hundreds of people throughout Europe and the former Soviet republics since the most recent resurgence in use began in Estonia in the early 2000s, and novel derivatives continue to appear.
