= Aknadinine =

Names
- Other names 4-demethylhasubanonine

Identifiers
CAS Number	24148-86-5
3D model (JSmol)	Interactive image
ChEBI	CHEBI:229137
ChEMBL	ChEMBL1098359
ChemSpider	140631
PubChem CID	159966
UNII	V5XGU77PZ9
- InChI: InChI=1S/C20H25NO5/c1-21-10-9-19-11-13(22)17(25-3)18(26-4)20(19,21)8-7-12-5-6-14(24-2)16(23)15(12)19/h5-6,23H,7-11H2,1-4H3/t19-,20+/m0/s1 Key: XLWYWPDYNLZUJS-VQTJNVASSA-N
- SMILES: CN1CC[C@@]23[C@@]1(CCC4=C2C(=C(C=C4)OC)O)C(=C(C(=O)C3)OC)OC

Properties
Chemical formula	C_{20}H_{25}NO_{5}
Molar mass	359.42
- Except where otherwise noted, data are given for materials in their standard state (at 25 °C [77 °F], 100 kPa). Infobox references

Aknadinine (also known as 4-demethylhasubanonine) is an opioid alkaloid isolated from members of the genus Stephania (Stephania cepharantha and Stephania hernandifolia.). Structurally it is a member of the hasubanan family of alkaloids and features an isoquinoline substructure.

== See also ==
- Hasubanonine
