= Picenadol =

Chemical compound

Clinical data
- ATC code: none

Identifiers
- IUPAC name: 3-(1,3-dimethyl-4-propylpiperidin-4-yl)phenol
- CAS Number: 79201-85-7
- PubChem CID: 53077
- ChemSpider: 47943
- UNII: TV3535QWTJ

Chemical and physical data
- Formula: C_{16}H_{25}NO
- Molar mass: 247.382 g·mol^{−1}
- 3D model (JSmol): Interactive image
- SMILES: OC1=CC=CC([C@@]2(CCN(C[C@@H]2C)C)CCC)=C1
- InChI: InChI=1S/C16H25NO/c1-4-8-16(9-10-17(3)12-13(16)2)14-6-5-7-15(18)11-14/h5-7,11,13,18H,4,8-10,12H2,1-3H3/t13-,16-/m0/s1; Key:RTOHPIRUUAKHOZ-BBRMVZONSA-N

Picenadol (LY-97435) is a 4-phenylpiperidine derivative that is an opioid analgesic drug developed by Eli Lilly in the 1970s.

Picenadol is an effective analgesic with similar efficacy to pethidine (meperidine). It has been investigated for some applications such as obstetrics and dentistry, but never commercialised.

It is unusual in that one enantiomer is a pure μ-opioid agonist, while the other is an antagonist. The (3R,4R) isomer is the agonist, while (3S,4S) is antagonist. This means that the racemic mix of the two enantiomers is a mixed agonist-antagonist, with relatively low abuse potential, and little of the κ-opioid activity that tends to cause problems with other opioid mixed agonist-antagonists such as pentazocine.

== Synthesis ==
Picenadol synthesis 1:

Picenadol synthesis 2:

== See also ==
- Ketobemidone
