= TRIMU 5 =

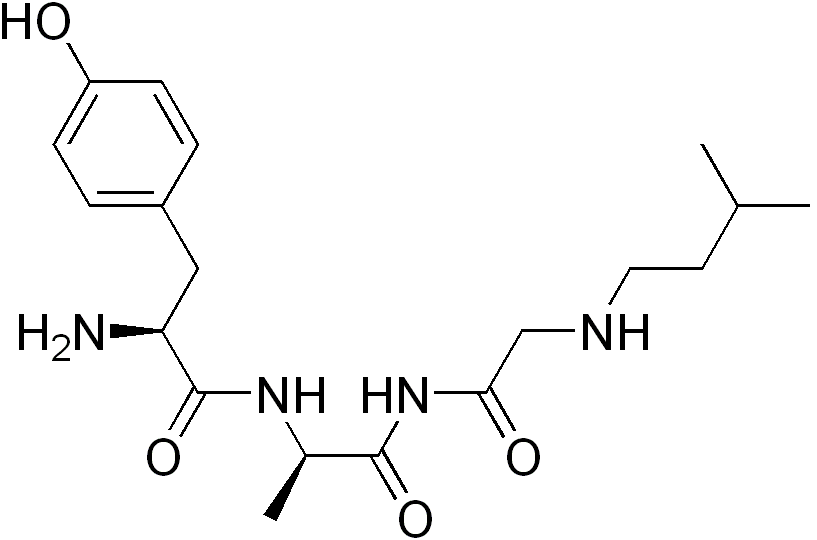

Names
- IUPAC name L-Tyrosyl-N-{[(3-methylbutyl)amino]acetyl}-D-alaninamide
- Systematic IUPAC name (2R)-2-Amino-3-(4-hydroxyphenyl)-N-[(2R)-1-{2-[(3-methylbutyl)amino]acetamido}-1-oxopropan-2-yl]propanamide

Identifiers
CAS Number	90815-77-3
3D model (JSmol)	Interactive image
ChemSpider	21106389
PubChem CID	5487273
CompTox Dashboard (EPA)	DTXSID80905105
- InChI: InChI=1S/C19H30N4O4/c1-12(2)8-9-21-11-17(25)23-18(26)13(3)22-19(27)16(20)10-14-4-6-15(24)7-5-14/h4-7,12-13,16,21,24H,8-11,20H2,1-3H3,(H,22,27)(H,23,25,26)/t13-,16?/m1/s1 Key: QOGVSHVPIMZZRN-JBZHPUCOSA-N; InChI=1/C19H30N4O4/c1-12(2)8-9-21-11-17(25)23-18(26)13(3)22-19(27)16(20)10-14-4-6-15(24)7-5-14/h4-7,12-13,16,21,24H,8-11,20H2,1-3H3,(H,22,27)(H,23,25,26)/t13-,16?/m1/s1 Key: QOGVSHVPIMZZRN-JBZHPUCOBN
- SMILES: Oc1ccc(C[C@@H](N)C(=O)N[C@H](C)C(=O)NC(=O)CNCCC(C)C)cc1

Properties
Chemical formula	C_{19}H_{30}N_{4}O_{4}
Molar mass	378.466
- Except where otherwise noted, data are given for materials in their standard state (at 25 °C [77 °F], 100 kPa). verify (what is ?) Infobox references

TRIMU-5 is a selective agonist of the μ_{2}-opioid receptor and antagonist of the μ_{1}-opioid receptor. It produces analgesia in animals that differs from that of conventional μ-opioid receptor agonists but that can still be blocked by μ-opioid receptor antagonists. TRIMU-5 can also block the analgesic effects of μ-opioid receptor agonists like morphine. In addition to analgesia, TRIMU-5 inhibits gastrointestinal transit, a known effect of μ_{2}-opioid receptor activation.
