= 14-Hydroxymorphine =

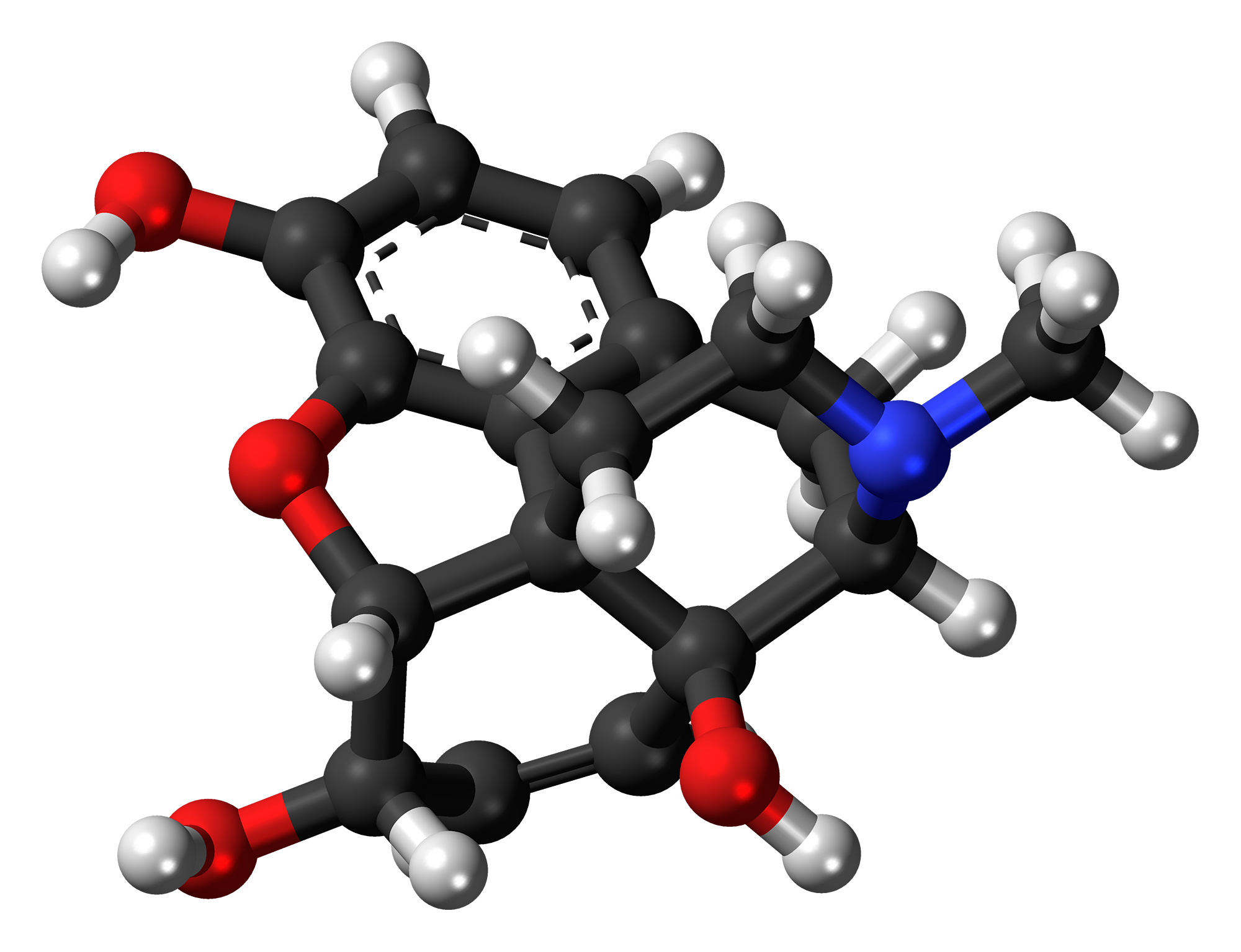

Names
- IUPAC name 17-Methyl-7,8-didehydro-4,5α-epoxymorphinan-3,6α,14-triol
- Systematic IUPAC name (4R,4aS,7S,7aR,12bS)-3-Methyl-2,3,4,4a,7,7a-hexahydro-1H-4,12-methano[1]benzofuro[3,2-e]isoquinoline-4a,7,9-triol

Identifiers
CAS Number	3371-56-0
3D model (JSmol)	Interactive image
ChEMBL	ChEMBL1951703
ChemSpider	4591199
PubChem CID	5492873
UNII	87AZ2QM6Z7
CompTox Dashboard (EPA)	DTXSID20955326
- InChI: InChI=1S/C17H19NO4/c1-18-7-6-16-13-9-2-3-10(19)14(13)22-15(16)11(20)4-5-17(16,21)12(18)8-9/h2-5,11-12,15,19-21H,6-8H2,1H3/t11-,12+,15-,16-,17+/m0/s1 Key: WYMBHLXUDPDGQJ-BRJGLHKUSA-N; InChI=1S/C17H19NO4/c1-18-7-6-16-13-9-2-3-10(19)14(13)22-15(16)11(20)4-5-17(16,21)12(18)8-9/h2-5,11-12,15,19-21H,6-8H2,1H3/t11-,12+,15-,16-,17+/m0/s1 Key: 1S/C17H19NO4/c1-18-7-6-16-13-9-2-3-10(19)14(13)22-15(16)11(20)4-5-17(16,21)12(18)8-9/h2-5,11-12,15,19-21H,6-8H2,1H3/t11-,12+,15-,16-,17+/m0/s1
- SMILES: CN1CC[C@]23[C@@H]4[C@H](C=C[C@]2([C@H]1CC5=C3C(=C(C=C5)O)O4)O)O

Properties
Chemical formula	C_{17}H_{19}NO_{3}
Molar mass	301.34 g/mol
- Except where otherwise noted, data are given for materials in their standard state (at 25 °C [77 °F], 100 kPa). Infobox references

14-Hydroxymorphine is a semi-synthetic opioid, chemical compound closely related to alkaloid morphine, characterized by an additional hydroxyl group at the 14th position.

It is a potential precursor or metabolite of other potent opioids, such as oxymorphone (which is 14-hydroxydihydromorphinone). Its chemical structure includes the basic morphine skeleton with additional complexity at the 14th carbon atom, It is primarily of interest in chemical and pharmacological research as an intermediate in the synthesis of more potent semi-synthetic opioids.

14-hydroxymorphine acts primarily as a μ-opioid receptor (MOR) agonist. It also exhibits some activity at other opioid receptors, but its primary action is at the MOR.
