= 1-Iodomorphine =

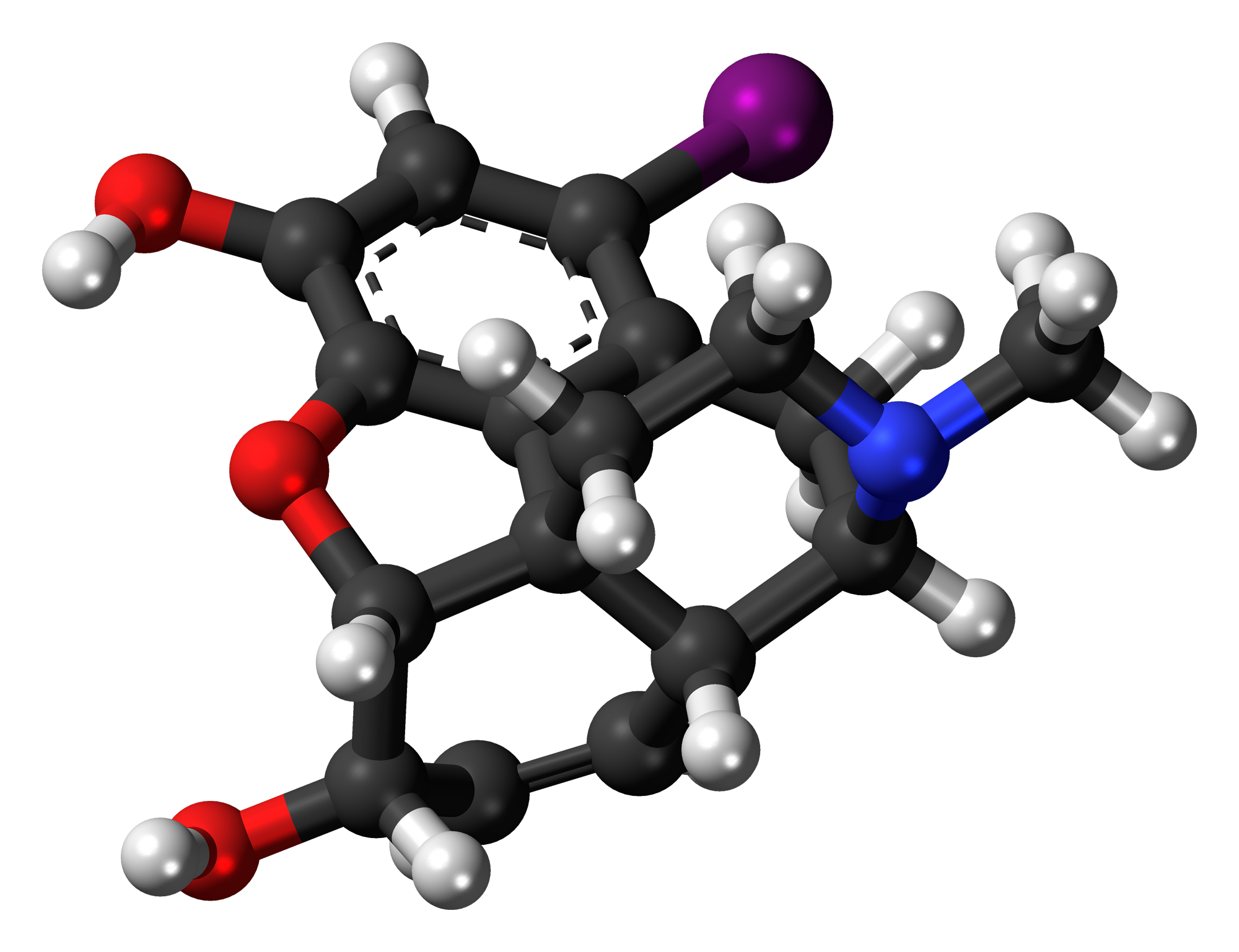

Names
- IUPAC name 1-Iodo-17-methyl-7,8-didehydro-4,5α-epoxymorphinan-3,6α-diol
- Systematic IUPAC name (4R,4aR,7S,7aR,12bS)-11-Iodo-3-methyl-2,3,4,4a,7,7a-hexahydro-1H-4,12-methano[1]benzofuro[3,2-e]isoquinoline-7,9-diol
- Other names (5α,6α)-7,8-Didehydro-4,5-epoxy-1-iodo-17-methyl-morphinan-3,6-diol

Identifiers
CAS Number	64739-76-0
3D model (JSmol)	Interactive image
ChemSpider	9168496
PubChem CID	10993301
UNII	27HC478ARM
CompTox Dashboard (EPA)	DTXSID60451094
- InChI: InChI=1S/C17H18INO3/c1-19-5-4-17-9-2-3-12(20)16(17)22-15-13(21)7-10(18)8(14(15)17)6-11(9)19/h2-3,7,9,11-12,16,20-21H,4-6H2,1H3/t9-,11+,12-,16-,17-/m0/s1 Key: YFXOJQFZAJTGHD-GLWLLPOHSA-N; InChI=1/C17H18INO3/c1-19-5-4-17-9-2-3-12(20)16(17)22-15-13(21)7-10(18)8(14(15)17)6-11(9)19/h2-3,7,9,11-12,16,20-21H,4-6H2,1H3/t9-,11+,12-,16-,17-/m0/s1 Key: YFXOJQFZAJTGHD-GLWLLPOHBC
- SMILES: O[C@H]1\C=C/[C@H]4[C@H]2Cc5c3c(O[C@@H]1[C@]34CCN2C)c(O)cc5I

Properties
Chemical formula	C_{17}H_{18}INO_{3}
Molar mass	411.239 g·mol^{−1}
- Except where otherwise noted, data are given for materials in their standard state (at 25 °C [77 °F], 100 kPa). verify (what is ?) Infobox references

1-Iodomorphine is a semi-synthetic narcotic analgesic formed by halogenation of the 1 position on the morphine carbon skeleton. Halogenated morphine derivatives were first synthesised in Germany, Austria/Austria-Hungary, the United Kingdom and the United States in the period 1890 to 1930. Use of this drug increased after 1945 for the below-mentioned research. It is a research chemical which is often prepared in the laboratory when it is needed.

Along with the similar 2-iodomorphine as well as iodinated analogs of dihydromorphine, dihydrocodeine, heroin, and the fluorinated, chlorinated, and brominated analogues of this series, this change may not impact the activity of the drug to a notable extent but 1- and 2-iodomorphine are used in pharmacological, neurological, metabolic, and endocrine research as it allows the tagging of morphine with iodine-131 or iodine-129. Such research was important in the discovery of opioid receptors in the central nervous system, peripheral nervous system, and other tissues in humans, mammals, birds, and some reptiles, amphibians, fish, insects, and arthropods.
