= SoRI-9409 =

Chemical compound

Identifiers
- PubChem CID: 9805452
- ChemSpider: 7981212
- ChEMBL: ChEMBL610261
- CompTox Dashboard (EPA): DTXSID001029851

Chemical and physical data
- Formula: C_{29}H_{27}ClN_{2}O_{3}
- Molar mass: 487.00 g·mol^{−1}
- 3D model (JSmol): Interactive image
- SMILES: C1CC1CN2CC[C@]34[C@@H]5C6=C(C[C@]3([C@H]2CC7=C4C(=C(C=C7)O)O5)O)C=C(C=N6)C8=CC=C(C=C8)Cl
- InChI: InChI=1S/C29H27ClN2O3/c30-21-6-3-17(4-7-21)20-11-19-13-29(34)23-12-18-5-8-22(33)26-24(18)28(29,27(35-26)25(19)31-14-20)9-10-32(23)15-16-1-2-16/h3-8,11,14,16,23,27,33-34H,1-2,9-10,12-13,15H2/t23-,27+,28+,29-/m1/s1; Key:WRVDUHKCIPYGNZ-FQYQUSJJSA-N

SoRI-9409 is a mixed mu opioid receptor partial agonist and delta opioid receptor antagonist, used in biomedical research. It produces moderate analgesic effects without development of tolerance and with reduced withdrawal symptoms compared to standard opioid analgesics, as well as showing anti-addictive effects that may be useful in the treatment of alcoholism.
