= Trefentanil =

Chemical compound

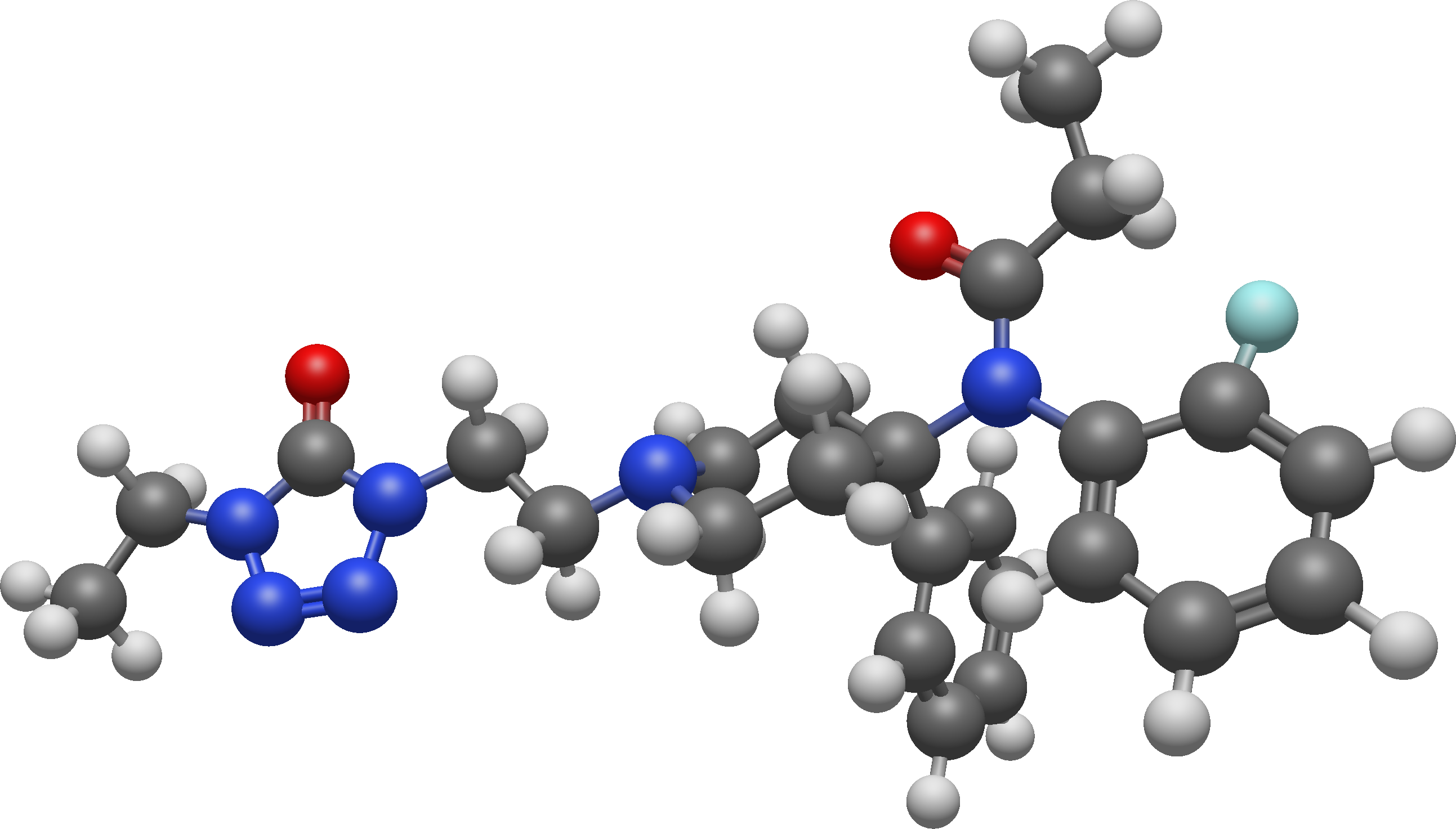

Clinical data
- ATC code: none

Identifiers
- IUPAC name: N-{1-[2-(4-ethyl-5-oxo-4,5-dihydro-1H-tetrazol-1-yl)ethyl]-4-phenylpiperidin-4-yl}-N-(2-fluorophenyl)propanamide
- CAS Number: 120656-74-8; HCl: 120656-93-1
- PubChem CID: 60728
- ChemSpider: 54732
- UNII: 36QM58LVGU; HCl: 20742ZOB3G
- ChEMBL: ChEMBL84617
- CompTox Dashboard (EPA): DTXSID80152955

Chemical and physical data
- Formula: C_{25}H_{31}FN_{6}O_{2}
- Molar mass: 466.561 g·mol^{−1}
- 3D model (JSmol): Interactive image
- SMILES: Fc1ccccc1N(C(=O)CC)C4(c2ccccc2)CCN(CCN3\N=N/N(C3=O)CC)CC4
- InChI: InChI=1S/C25H31FN6O2/c1-3-23(33)32(22-13-9-8-12-21(22)26)25(20-10-6-5-7-11-20)14-16-29(17-15-25)18-19-31-24(34)30(4-2)27-28-31/h5-13H,3-4,14-19H2,1-2H3; Key:RJSCINHYBGMIFT-UHFFFAOYSA-N

Trefentanil (A-3665) is an opioid analgesic that is an analogue of fentanyl and was developed in 1992.

Trefentanil is most similar to short-acting fentanyl analogues such as alfentanil. In comparative studies, trefentanil was slightly more potent and shorter acting than alfentanil as an analgesic, but induced significantly more severe respiratory depression. For this reason trefentanil has not been adopted for clinical use, although it is still used in research.

Trefentanil has very similar effects to alfentanil, much like those of fentanyl itself but more potent and shorter lasting. Side effects of fentanyl analogs are similar to those of fentanyl itself, which include itching, nausea and potentially serious respiratory depression, which can be life-threatening. Fentanyl analogs have killed hundreds of people throughout Europe and the former Soviet republics since the most recent resurgence in use began in Estonia in the early 2000s, and novel derivatives continue to appear. The risk of respiratory depression is especially high with potent fentanyl analogues such as alfentanil and trefentanil, and these drugs pose a significant risk of death if used outside of a hospital setting with appropriate artificial breathing apparatus available.
