= SC-17599 =

Chemical compound

Clinical data
- Other names: SC-17599; 17α-Acetoxy-6-dimethylaminomethyl-21-fluoro-3-ethoxypregna-3,5-dien-20-one; [(8R,9S,10R,13S,14S,17R)-6-(dimethylaminomethyl)-3-ethoxy-17-(2-fluoroacetyl)-10,13-dimethyl-1,2,7,8,9,11,12,14,15,16-decahydrocyclopenta[a]phenanthren-17-yl] acetate

Legal status
- Legal status: In general: legal

Identifiers
- IUPAC name: 6-[(dimethylamino)methyl]-3-ethoxy-21-fluoro-20-oxopregna-3,5-dien-17-yl acetate
- CAS Number: 23775-92-0
- PubChem CID: 10436424
- ChemSpider: 8611848
- UNII: J9BXL4PC5V
- CompTox Dashboard (EPA): DTXSID301018437

Chemical and physical data
- Formula: C_{28}H_{42}FNO_{4}
- Molar mass: 475.645 g·mol^{−1}
- 3D model (JSmol): Interactive image
- SMILES: FCC(=O)[C@@]1(OC(=O)C)CC[C@H]2[C@H]4[C@H](CC[C@]12C)[C@@]3(C(\C=C(\OCC)CC3)=C(\CN(C)C)C4)C
- InChI: InChI=1S/C28H42FNO4/c1-7-33-20-8-11-26(3)22-9-12-27(4)23(10-13-28(27,25(32)16-29)34-18(2)31)21(22)14-19(17-30(5)6)24(26)15-20/h15,21-23H,7-14,16-17H2,1-6H3/t21-,22+,23+,26-,27+,28+/m1/s1; Key:ZPVGJKVIJYUOCI-ORZTVLAMSA-N

SC-17599 is a steroid derivative drug discovered in 1968 which acts as a selective μ-opioid receptor agonist, with little or no affinity for the δ-opioid or κ-opioid receptors. It is an active analgesic in vivo, more potent than codeine or pethidine but slightly less potent than morphine, and produces similar effects to morphine in animals but with less sedation

== See also ==
- Cyproterone acetate
