= 14-Ethoxymetopon =

Chemical compound

Identifiers
- IUPAC name: 3-Hydroxy-14-ethoxy-5-methyl-7,8-dihydro-4,5α-epoxy-17-methylmorphinan-6-one
- CAS Number: 131575-04-7
- PubChem CID: 5487378
- ChemSpider: 4589341
- CompTox Dashboard (EPA): DTXSID50157119

Chemical and physical data
- Formula: C_{20}H_{25}NO_{4}
- Molar mass: 343.423 g·mol^{−1}
- 3D model (JSmol): Interactive image
- SMILES: CCOC12CCC(=O)[C@@]3(C14CCN([C@@H]2CC5=C4C(=C(C=C5)O)O3)C)C
- InChI: InChI=1S/C20H25NO4/c1-4-24-20-8-7-15(23)18(2)19(20)9-10-21(3)14(20)11-12-5-6-13(22)17(25-18)16(12)19/h5-6,14,22H,4,7-11H2,1-3H3/t14-,18-,19?,20?/m1/s1; Key:LDTUYTORBPKTNO-HPJZBDCMSA-N

14-Ethoxymetopon is an opioid analog that is a derivative of metopon which has been substituted with an ethoxy group at the 14-position. It is a highly potent analgesic drug several hundred times more potent than morphine.
