= Azidomorphine =

Chemical compound

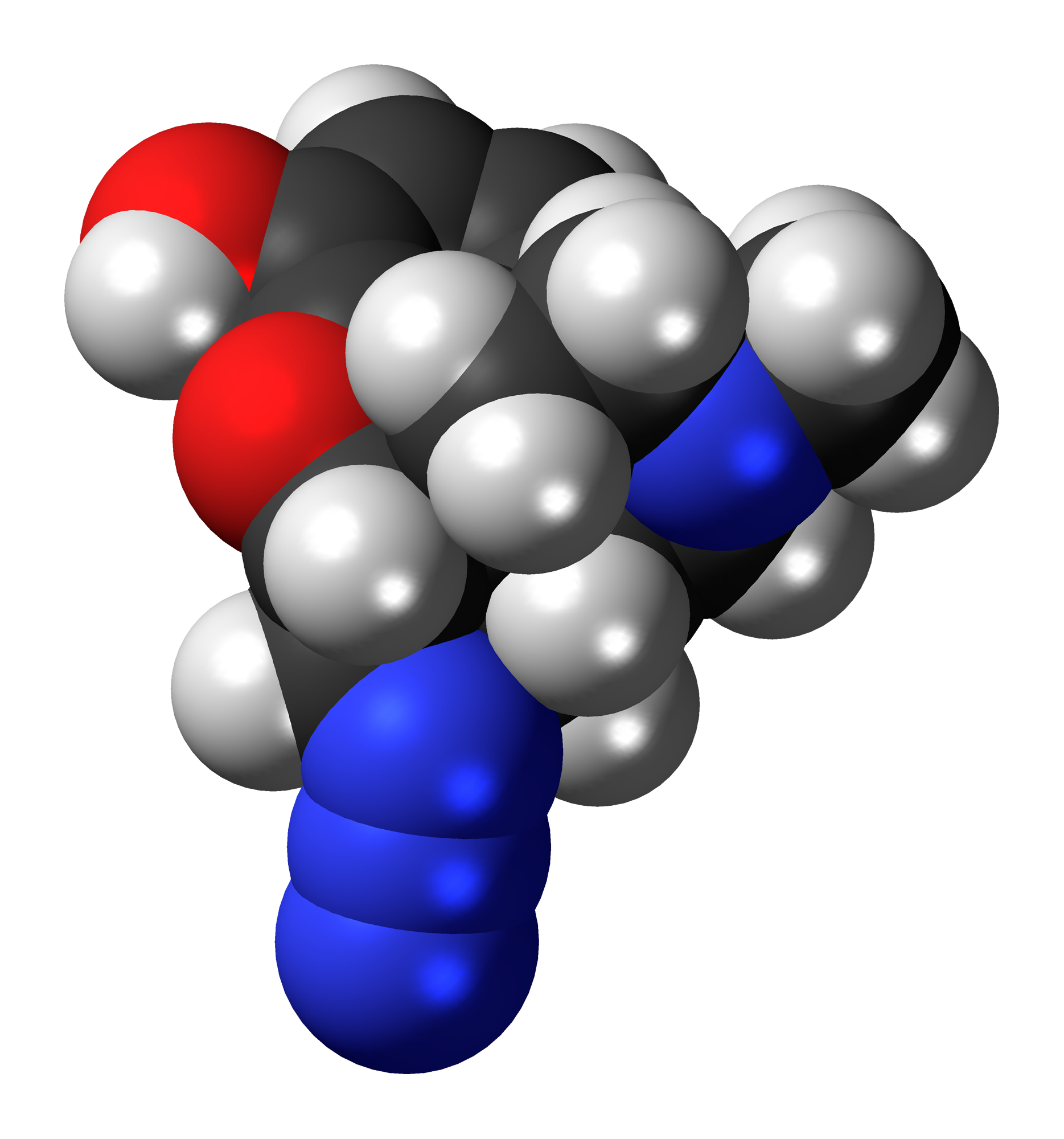

Clinical data
- Other names: Azidomorphine
- ATC code: none

Identifiers
- IUPAC name: (6β)-Azido-4,5-α-epoxy-17-methyl morphinan-3-ol
- CAS Number: 22952-87-0
- PubChem CID: 5488848
- ChemSpider: 4590009
- UNII: U973VU74ER
- CompTox Dashboard (EPA): DTXSID90177497
- ECHA InfoCard: 100.041.211

Chemical and physical data
- Formula: C_{17}H_{20}N_{4}O_{2}
- Molar mass: 312.373 g·mol^{−1}
- 3D model (JSmol): Interactive image
- SMILES: [N-]=[N+]=N\[C@H]4[C@@H]5Oc1c2c(ccc1O)C[C@H]3N(CC[C@]25[C@H]3CC4)C
- InChI: InChI=1S/C17H20N4O2/c1-21-7-6-17-10-3-4-11(19-20-18)16(17)23-15-13(22)5-2-9(14(15)17)8-12(10)21/h2,5,10-12,16,22H,3-4,6-8H2,1H3/t10-,11+,12+,16-,17-/m0/s1; Key:KZOKOEQTKWBKOK-XHQKLZHNSA-N

Azidomorphine is an opiate analogue that is a derivative of morphine, where the 7,8 double bond has been saturated and the 6-hydroxy group has been replaced by an azide group.

Azidomorphine binds with high affinity to the mu opioid receptor, and is around 40× more potent than morphine in vivo. It has similar effects to morphine, including analgesia, sedation, and respiratory depression. However, its addiction liability has been found to be slightly lower than that of morphine in animal studies.
