= Etazocine =

Chemical compound

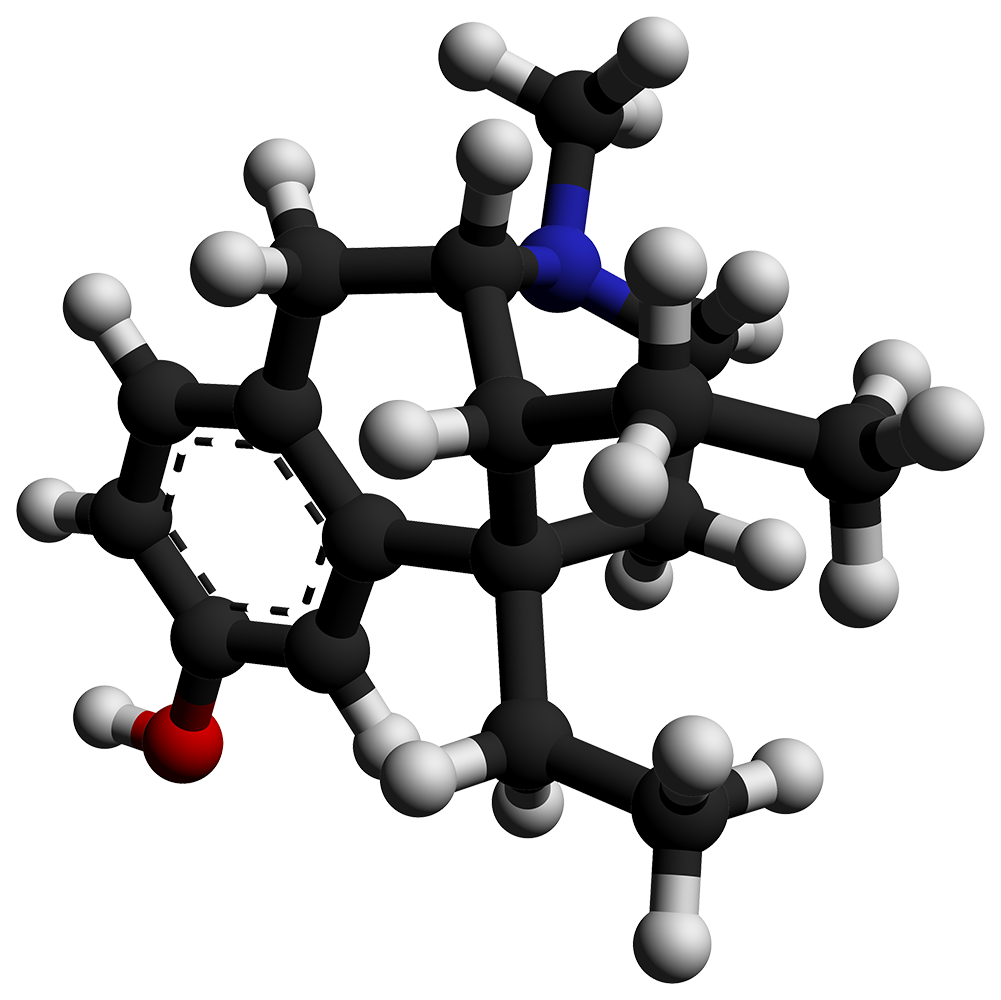

Clinical data
- Other names: NIH-7856 ((±)-form); GPA-208 ((−)-form); GPA-2087 ((−)-form); NIH-8178 ((−)-form); FDA-0487 ((−)-form)
- ATC code: None

Legal status
- Legal status: In general: non-regulated

Identifiers
- IUPAC name: 1,2,3,4,5,6-hexahydro-6,11-diethyl-3-methyl-2,6-methano-3-benzazocin-8-ol or 5,7-diethyl-2-hydroxy-2-methyl-6,7-benzomorphan
- CAS Number: 0135188AB 10286-45-0 ((−)-form (HCl))
- PubChem CID: 187767
- ChemSpider: 163214
- UNII: 25Z262VU9E

Chemical and physical data
- Formula: C_{17}H_{25}NO
- Molar mass: 259.393 g·mol^{−1}
- 3D model (JSmol): Interactive image
- SMILES: Oc1ccc3c(c1)[C@@]2([C@H]([C@@H](N(CC2)C)C3)CC)CC
- InChI: InChI=1S/C17H25NO/c1-4-14-16-10-12-6-7-13(19)11-15(12)17(14,5-2)8-9-18(16)3/h6-7,11,14,16,19H,4-5,8-10H2,1-3H3/t14-,16-,17-/m0/s1; Key:JYRBQCWXZNDERM-XIRDDKMYSA-N

Etazocine (NIH-7856) is an opioid analgesic of the benzomorphan family which was never marketed. It acts as a partial agonist of the opioid receptors, with mixed agonist and antagonist effects. In animal studies, it was shown to induce analgesia, dependency, and respiratory depression, with overall effects similar to those of morphine, but with substantially reduced potency in comparison.

== See also ==
- Benzomorphan
