= Pentamorphone =

Chemical compound

Clinical data
- ATC code: none

Legal status
- Legal status: US: Schedule I

Identifiers
- IUPAC name: 4,5α-Epoxy-3-hydroxy-14β-pentylamino-17-methyl-7,8-didehydromorphinan-6-one
- CAS Number: 68616-83-1
- PubChem CID: 5464186
- ChemSpider: 4576571
- UNII: MM4487B4MW
- KEGG: D05416
- CompTox Dashboard (EPA): DTXSID901018235

Chemical and physical data
- Formula: C_{22}H_{28}N_{2}O_{3}
- Molar mass: 368.477 g·mol^{−1}
- 3D model (JSmol): Interactive image
- SMILES: CCCCCN[C@@]12C=CC(=O)[C@H]3[C@@]14CCN([C@@H]2CC5=C4C(=C(C=C5)O)O3)C
- InChI: InChI=1S/C22H28N2O3/c1-3-4-5-11-23-22-9-8-16(26)20-21(22)10-12-24(2)17(22)13-14-6-7-15(25)19(27-20)18(14)21/h6-9,17,20,23,25H,3-5,10-13H2,1-2H3/t17-,20+,21+,22-/m1/s1; Key:NRPCWSUJMWEFOK-KDXIVRHGSA-N

Pentamorphone (14β-pentylaminomorphinone, RX-77989) is a semi-synthetic opiate derivative related to compounds such as Morphinone and oxymorphone. Developed in 1984, it is a potent opioid analgesic several times stronger than fentanyl, and with a similarly fast onset of effects and short duration of action. It was found to produce relatively little respiratory depression compared to other potent opioid agonists, but its analgesic effects were somewhat disappointing in human trials, and while pentamorphone had some slight advantages over fentanyl these were not sufficient to warrant its introduction into clinical use.
