= Pseudoakuammigine =

Names
- IUPAC name methyl (9S,14E,15S,19S)-14-ethylidene-2-methyl-18-oxa-2,12-diazahexacyclo[13.3.2.0^{1,9}.0^{3,8}.0^{9,16}.0^{12,19}]icosa-3,5,7-triene-16-carboxylate
- Other names 10-deoxy-Akuammine

Identifiers
CAS Number	2447-70-3
3D model (JSmol)	Interactive image
ChemSpider	4952819
PubChem CID	6450202
UNII	674R7808HC
- InChI: InChI=1S/C22H26N2O3/c1-4-14-12-24-10-9-21-15-7-5-6-8-17(15)23(2)22(21)18(24)11-16(14)20(21,13-27-22)19(25)26-3/h4-8,16,18H,9-13H2,1-3H3/b14-4-/t16-,18-,20?,21-,22?/m0/s1 Key: HAGBWVNSVWLTKY-WPDGONQWSA-N
- SMILES: [H][C@]1(N2C/3)C[C@@]([C@@]4(C(OC)=O)[C@@]5(CC2)C1(OC4)N(C)C6=C5C=CC=C6)([H])C3=C/C

Properties
Chemical formula	C_{22}H_{26}N_{2}O_{3}
Molar mass	366.461 g·mol^{−1}
- Except where otherwise noted, data are given for materials in their standard state (at 25 °C [77 °F], 100 kPa). Infobox references

Pseudoakuammigine is a bio-active alkaloid from Alstonia boonei, a medicinal tree from West Africa.
