= Sinococuline =

Names
- IUPAC name 3,8-Dimethoxy-8,14-didehydro-9α,13α-morphinan-4,6β,7β-triol
- Systematic IUPAC name (2S,3S,4aS,10S)-2,3,4-Trihydroxy-1,5-dimethoxy-3,4,9,10-tetrahydro-2H-10,4a-(azanoethano)phenanthrene

Identifiers
| CAS Number | 109351-36-2 |
| 3D model (JSmol) | Interactive image |
| ChEMBL | ChEMBL524026 |
| ChemSpider | 10258838 |
| PubChem CID | 5489400 |
| UNII | J5624PB437 |
| CompTox Dashboard (EPA) | DTXSID00911127 |
- InChI: InChI=1S/C18H23NO5/c1-23-12-4-3-9-7-10-14-17(24-2)15(21)11(20)8-18(14,5-6-19-10)13(9)16(12)22/h3-4,10-11,15,19-22H,5-8H2,1-2H3/t10-,11-,15-,18-/m0/s1 Key: MFKPWBJXKCSPGK-KNORBDTNSA-N
- SMILES: COC1=C(C2=C(C[C@H]3C4=C([C@H]([C@H](C[C@]42CCN3)O)O)OC)C=C1)O

Properties
| Chemical formula | C_{18}H_{23}NO_{5} |
| Molar mass | 333.384 g·mol^{−1} |
- Except where otherwise noted, data are given for materials in their standard state (at 25 °C [77 °F], 100 kPa). Infobox references

Sinococuline is a bioactive alkaloid found in Cocculus trilobus.
