= 7-Spiroindanyloxymorphone =

Chemical compound

Identifiers
- IUPAC name: (4aR-(4aα,7aα,8α,9cα))-1',3',7,7a,8,9-Hexahydro-3,7a-dihydroxy-12-methylspiro[6H-8,9c](iminoethano)phenanthro[4,5-bcd]furan-6,2'-(2H)inden)-5(4aH)-one
- CAS Number: 150380-34-0
- PubChem CID: 5487084
- ChemSpider: 8176808
- UNII: 35UF85T692
- CompTox Dashboard (EPA): DTXSID60933926

Chemical and physical data
- Formula: C_{25}H_{25}NO_{4}
- Molar mass: 403.478 g·mol^{−1}
- 3D model (JSmol): Interactive image
- SMILES: CN1CCC23[C@@H]4C(=O)C5(CC6=CC=CC=C6C5)C[C@]2([C@@H]1CC7=C3C(=C(C=C7)O)O4)O
- InChI: InChI=1S/C25H25NO4/c1-26-9-8-24-19-14-6-7-17(27)20(19)30-22(24)21(28)23(13-25(24,29)18(26)10-14)11-15-4-2-3-5-16(15)12-23/h2-7,18,22,27,29H,8-13H2,1H3/t18?,22-,24-,25+/m0/s1; Key:YJWDKWRVFJZBCJ-OVKCVFHGSA-N

7-Spiroindanyloxymorphone (SIOM) is a drug that is used in scientific research. It is a selective δ-opioid agonist. It is a derivative of oxymorphone.
