= Homprenorphine =

Chemical compound

Clinical data
- ATC code: None

Identifiers
- IUPAC name: 2-[17-(cyclopropylmethyl)-3,6-dimethoxy-7,8-didehydro-18,19-dihydro-4,5-epoxy-6,14-ethenomorphinan-18-yl]butan-2-ol
- CAS Number: 16549-56-7
- PubChem CID: 3084250
- ChemSpider: 2341344
- UNII: SH57250J2D
- ChEMBL: ChEMBL2104317
- CompTox Dashboard (EPA): DTXSID80864687

Chemical and physical data
- Formula: C_{28}H_{37}NO_{4}
- Molar mass: 451.607 g·mol^{−1}
- 3D model (JSmol): Interactive image
- SMILES: OC(C)(CC)C7CC63\C=C/C7(OC)C4Oc1c2c(ccc1OC)CC6N(CCC234)CC5CC5

Homprenorphine (M-5202; R&S-5205-M) is an opioid analgesic of the thebaine series which was synthesized and assayed in 1967, but was not further studied and was never marketed.

== See also ==
- Buprenorphine
