= Carbazocine =

Chemical compound

Clinical data
- ATC code: None

Identifiers
- IUPAC name: 20-(cyclopropylmethyl)-3,20-diazapentacyclo[10.5.3.0^{1,13}.0^{2,10}.0^{4,9}]icosa-2(10),4,6,8-tetraene
- CAS Number: 15686-38-1
- PubChem CID: 27442
- ChemSpider: 25536
- UNII: FO53I0P67V
- ChEMBL: ChEMBL2104073

Chemical and physical data
- Formula: C_{22}H_{28}N_{2}
- Molar mass: 320.480 g·mol^{−1}
- 3D model (JSmol): Interactive image
- SMILES: c24c(c1ccccc1[nH]2)CC5N(CC3CC3)CCC46C5CCCC6
- InChI: InChI=1S/C22H28N2/c1-2-7-19-16(5-1)17-13-20-18-6-3-4-10-22(18,21(17)23-19)11-12-24(20)14-15-8-9-15/h1-2,5,7,15,18,20,23H,3-4,6,8-14H2; Key:MMGJNINGVUMRFI-UHFFFAOYSA-N

Carbazocine is an opioid analgesic of the benzomorphan family which was never marketed.

== See also ==
- Benzomorphan
