= Gemazocine =

Chemical compound

Clinical data
- ATC code: None

Identifiers
- IUPAC name: 10-(cyclopropylmethyl)-1-ethyl-13,13-dimethyl-10-azatricyclo[7.3.1.0^{2,7}]trideca-2,4,6-trien-4-ol
- CAS Number: 54063-47-7
- PubChem CID: 219096
- ChemSpider: 189916
- UNII: V1A2S0LB62
- ChEMBL: ChEMBL2105066
- CompTox Dashboard (EPA): DTXSID401023893

Chemical and physical data
- Formula: C_{20}H_{29}NO
- Molar mass: 299.458 g·mol^{−1}
- 3D model (JSmol): Interactive image
- SMILES: Oc1ccc4c(c1)C2(C(C(N(CC2)CC3CC3)C4)(C)C)CC
- InChI: InChI=1S/C20H29NO/c1-4-20-9-10-21(13-14-5-6-14)18(19(20,2)3)11-15-7-8-16(22)12-17(15)20/h7-8,12,14,18,22H,4-6,9-11,13H2,1-3H3; Key:AFZOCGNTFCGOEE-UHFFFAOYSA-N

Gemazocine (R-15,497), also known as cyclogemine, is a non-selective opioid antagonist of the benzomorphan class. It may have partial agonist properties at some of the opioid receptors, such as at the kappa receptor (as it induces dysphoric effects in humans), but seems to be generally antagonistic in its actions.
