= Sameridine =

Chemical compound

Clinical data
- Other names: LPB-139; LPB139
- ATC code: none

Identifiers
- IUPAC name: N-ethyl-1-hexyl-N-methyl-4-phenylpiperidine-4-carboxamide
- CAS Number: 143257-97-0
- PubChem CID: 65996
- ChemSpider: 59388
- UNII: NQP2Y50Y6B
- ChEMBL: ChEMBL2104504
- CompTox Dashboard (EPA): DTXSID30162367

Chemical and physical data
- Formula: C_{21}H_{34}N_{2}O
- Molar mass: 330.516 g·mol^{−1}
- 3D model (JSmol): Interactive image
- SMILES: O=C(N(CC)C)C2(c1ccccc1)CCN(CCCCCC)CC2
- InChI: InChI=1S/C21H34N2O/c1-4-6-7-11-16-23-17-14-21(15-18-23,20(24)22(3)5-2)19-12-9-8-10-13-19/h8-10,12-13H,4-7,11,14-18H2,1-3H3; Key:TYWUGCGYWNSRPS-UHFFFAOYSA-N

Sameridine (developmental code name LPB-139) is a 4-phenylpiperidine derivative that is related to the opioid analgesic drug pethidine (meperidine). It was under development as an anesthetic but was never marketed.

Sameridine has an unusual pharmacological profile, being both a local anaesthetic and a μ-opioid partial agonist. It is currently under development for use in surgical anasthesia, mainly administered by intrathecal infusion. It produces less respiratory depression than morphine, even at a high dose, and produces no respiratory depression at a low dose.

Sameridine is not currently a controlled drug, although if approved for medical use it will certainly be a prescription medicine, and it would probably be assigned to one of the controlled drug schedules in more restrictive jurisdictions such as Australia and the United States, especially if it were found to be addictive in animals.
