= Ibazocine =

Chemical compound

Clinical data
- ATC code: None

Identifiers
- IUPAC name: 1,13,13-trimethyl-10-(3-methyl-2-buten-1-yl)-10-azatricyclo[7.3.1.0^{2,7}]trideca-2,4,6-trien-4-ol
- CAS Number: 57653-28-8
- PubChem CID: 216286
- ChemSpider: 27470962
- UNII: 161094WKHI
- ChEMBL: ChEMBL2106302

Chemical and physical data
- Formula: C_{20}H_{29}NO
- Molar mass: 299.458 g·mol^{−1}
- 3D model (JSmol): Interactive image
- SMILES: CC(=CCN1CC[C@]2(c3cc(ccc3C[C@@H]1C2(C)C)O)C)C
- InChI: InChI=1S/C20H29NO/c1-14(2)8-10-21-11-9-20(5)17-13-16(22)7-6-15(17)12-18(21)19(20,3)4/h6-8,13,18,22H,9-12H2,1-5H3/t18-,20+/m1/s1; Key:CFUQBFQTFMOZBK-QUCCMNQESA-N

Ibazocine (INN, USAN) is an opioid analgesic which was never marketed.

== See also ==
- Benzomorphan
