= Thenylfentanyl =

Fentanyl analogue

- Chemical structure of thenylfentanyl

Legal status
- Legal status: US: Unscheduled

Identifiers
- IUPAC name: N-Phenyl-N-[1-(thiophen-2-ylmethyl)piperidin-4-yl]propanamide
- CAS Number: 122861-39-6
- PubChem CID: 21595404
- ChemSpider: 10551387
- UNII: 7O0847NUE9
- ChEMBL: ChEMBL2365725
- CompTox Dashboard (EPA): DTXSID30861242

Chemical and physical data
- Formula: C_{19}H_{24}N_{2}OS
- Molar mass: 328.47 g·mol^{−1}
- 3D model (JSmol): Interactive image
- SMILES: CCC(=O)N(C1CCN(CC1)CC2=CC=CS2)C3=CC=CC=C3
- InChI: InChI=InChI=1S/C19H24N2OS/c1-2-19(22)21(16-7-4-3-5-8-16)17-10-12-20(13-11-17)15-18-9-6-14-23-18/h3-9,14,17H,2,10-13,15H2,1H3; Key:JSOSWRYHPGIWGT-UHFFFAOYSA-N

Thenylfentanyl is an analogue of fentanyl where the phenethylamine side-chain has been replaced by a thiophenylmethyl group. It was temporarily scheduled by the Drug Enforcement Administration in 1985, due to fears it would be used as a designer drug. But in 2010 the DEA acknowledged it was essentially inactive. Subsequently, the substance was since deregulated.

== Legal status ==
The legality of fentanyl analogues vary by country. In the United States, thenylfentanyl is unscheduled.

== Uses ==
In much the same way that benzylfentanyl can be used to synthesize fentanyl, thenylfentanyl could ostensibly be used for the same purpose. In such a procedure, thenylfentanyl would first be de-thiophenylmethylated to norfentanyl. This would be followed by amination to fentanyl using phenethyl bromide.

== Chemistry ==
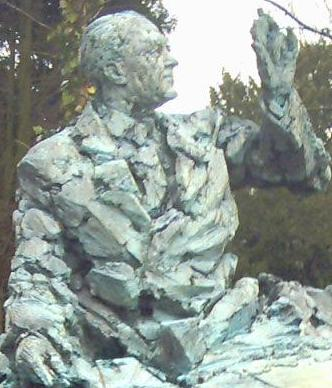
Statue of Paul Janssen

Thenylfentanyl is a N-arylalkylamide derivative of norfentanyl. The substance is also a structural isomer of acetylthiofentanyl, wherein a methyl group on the thiophene sidechain has been relocated to the carboxamide group nearest the aniline. It is due to this reduced sidechain length that Thenylfentanyl has dramatically diminished MOR activity compared to other fentanyl analogues. Many of fentanyl’s analogues were discovered by Belgian physician Paul Janssen.

== See also ==
- Homofentanyl
- Isofentanyl
- Benzylfentanyl
