= Alletorphine =

Chemical compound

Clinical data
- ATC code: None

Identifiers
- IUPAC name: (5α,6β,14β,18R)-18-[(1S)-1-hydroxy-1-methylbutyl]-6-methoxy-17-prop-2-en-1-yl-7,8-didehydro-18,19-dihydro-4,5-epoxy-6,14-ethenomorphinan-3-ol
- CAS Number: 23758-80-7
- PubChem CID: 72090
- ChemSpider: 16736565
- UNII: 4UWR086NOA
- ChEMBL: ChEMBL2104628
- CompTox Dashboard (EPA): DTXSID401029889

Chemical and physical data
- Formula: C_{27}H_{35}NO_{4}
- Molar mass: 437.580 g·mol^{−1}
- 3D model (JSmol): Interactive image
- SMILES: C[C@](O)(CCC)[C@H]6C[C@]42/C=C/[C@]6(OC)[C@@H]3Oc5c1c(C[C@H]4N(CC[C@@]123)CC=C)ccc5O
- InChI: InChI=1S/C27H35NO4/c1-5-9-24(3,30)19-16-25-10-11-27(19,31-4)23-26(25)12-14-28(13-6-2)20(25)15-17-7-8-18(29)22(32-23)21(17)26/h6-8,10-11,19-20,23,29-30H,2,5,9,12-16H2,1,3-4H3/t19-,20-,23-,24+,25-,26+,27-/m1/s1; Key:OSQIRUUENNTOQL-GCZKJHQNSA-N

Alletorphine (INN; M-218, R&S-218-M), or N-allylnoretorphine, is an opioid analgesic of the oripavine series which was never marketed.

== See also ==
- Etorphine
