= IBNtxA =

Chemical compound

Clinical data
- ATC code: none

Identifiers
- IUPAC name: N-[(4R,4aS,7R,7aR,12bS)-3-(cyclopropylmethyl)-4a,9-dihydroxy-1,2,4,5,6,7,7a,13-octahydro-4,12-methanobenzofuro[3,2-e]isoquinoline-7-yl]-3-iodobenzamide
- CAS Number: 1314879-44-1
- PubChem CID: 51003467
- ChemSpider: 26617995
- ChEMBL: ChEMBL1795711
- CompTox Dashboard (EPA): DTXSID201018246

Chemical and physical data
- Formula: C_{27}H_{29}IN_{2}O_{4}
- Molar mass: 572.443 g·mol^{−1}
- 3D model (JSmol): Interactive image
- SMILES: C1C[C@]2([C@H]3CC4=C5[C@@]2(CCN3CC6CC6)[C@H]([C@@H]1NC(=O)C7=CC(=CC=C7)I)OC5=C(C=C4)O)O
- InChI: InChI=1S/C27H29IN2O4/c28-18-3-1-2-17(12-18)25(32)29-19-8-9-27(33)21-13-16-6-7-20(31)23-22(16)26(27,24(19)34-23)10-11-30(21)14-15-4-5-15/h1-3,6-7,12,15,19,21,24,31,33H,4-5,8-11,13-14H2,(H,29,32)/t19-,21-,24+,26+,27-/m1/s1; Key:FGAFDGWRFOJPRY-XGTKUTNFSA-N

IBNtxA, or 3-iodobenzoyl naltrexamine, is an atypical opioid analgesic drug derived from naltrexone. In animal studies it produces potent analgesic effects that are blocked by levallorphan and so appear to be μ-opioid mediated, but it fails to produce constipation or respiratory depression, and is neither rewarding or aversive in conditioned place preference protocols. These unusual properties are thought to result from agonist action at a splice variant or heterodimer of the μ-opioid receptor, rather than at the classical full length form targeted by conventional opioid drugs.

In the Radioligand binding assay it has shown to have affinities of 0.11nM at the MOR, 0.24nM at the DOR and 0.03nM at the KOR and in the Hot- Plate Assay it is shown to be around 20x more potent than morphine. Azido Aryl Analogues of IBNtxA retain significant activity at the MOR.
