= Alimadol =

Chemical compound

Clinical data
- ATC code: None

Identifiers
- IUPAC name: N-(3-methoxy-3,3-diphenylpropyl)-2-propen-1-amine
- CAS Number: 52742-40-2
- PubChem CID: 176882
- ChemSpider: 154055
- UNII: 8ET970D66K
- ChEMBL: ChEMBL2106661
- CompTox Dashboard (EPA): DTXSID20200727

Chemical and physical data
- Formula: C_{19}H_{23}NO
- Molar mass: 281.399 g·mol^{−1}
- 3D model (JSmol): Interactive image
- SMILES: O(C)C(c1ccccc1)(c2ccccc2)CCNC\C=C
- InChI: InChI=1S/C19H23NO/c1-3-15-20-16-14-19(21-2,17-10-6-4-7-11-17)18-12-8-5-9-13-18/h3-13,20H,1,14-16H2,2H3; Key:QFSWEWNANAHUNE-UHFFFAOYSA-N

Alimadol (INN; A-4020) is an opioid analgesic related to methadone which was never marketed.

== Synthesis ==
Patent: Precursor (benzyl group sidechain):

- benzhydryl methyl ether [1016-09-7] (1)
- β-chloroethylamine [689-98-5] (2)
- 1,1-Diphenyl-1-methoxy-3-aminopropane: PC21534188 (3)
- Allyl bromide [106-95-6] (4)

== See also ==
- Methadone
