= 18,19-Dehydrobuprenorphine =

Names
- IUPAC name 17-Cyclopropylmethyl-4,5α-epoxy-6α,14α etheno-7α-(1-hydroxy-1,2,2-trimethylpropyl)-6β-methoxymorphinan-3-ol
- Other names HS 599

Identifiers
CAS Number	155203-05-7
3D model (JSmol)	Interactive image
ChemSpider	110805155
PubChem CID	101720618
UNII	BB3EB8AQ3P
CompTox Dashboard (EPA)	DTXSID701103363
- InChI: InChI=1S/C29H39NO4/c1-25(2,3)26(4,32)20-15-27-10-11-29(20,33-5)24-28(27)12-13-30(16-17-6-7-17)21(27)14-18-8-9-19(31)23(34-24)22(18)28/h8-11,17,20-21,24,31-32H,6-7,12-16H2,1-5H3/t20-,21-,24-,26+,27+,28+,29?/m1/s1 Key: XXEUUFWMPBSHCE-NFCPXPRCSA-N
- SMILES: C[C@]([C@H]1C[C@]23C=CC1([C@H]4[C@@]25CCN([C@@H]3CC6=C5C(=C(C=C6)O)O4)CC7CC7)OC)(C(C)(C)C)O

Properties
Chemical formula	C_{29}H_{39}NO_{4}
Molar mass	465.634 g·mol^{−1}
- Except where otherwise noted, data are given for materials in their standard state (at 25 °C [77 °F], 100 kPa). Infobox references

18,19-Dehydrobuprenorphine (HS-599) is a didehydro derivative of buprenorphine. It has about twice the potency of buprenorphine. It has produced a long-lasting antinociceptive response in animal tests.

18,19-Dehydrobuprenorphine never induced conditioned place-preference in test animals, unlike buprenorphine and morphine.

18,19-Dehydrobuprenorphine has about three times higher affinity for the μ-opioid receptor but lower affinity for δ- and κ-opioid receptors when compared with buprenorphine.
