= Norpropoxyphene =

Names
- Preferred IUPAC name (2S,3R)-3-Methyl-4-(methylamino)-1,2-diphenylbutan-2-yl propanoate

Identifiers
CAS Number	32501-12-5
3D model (JSmol)	Interactive image
ChemSpider	2341605
PubChem CID	3084563
UNII	C812VVS96K
CompTox Dashboard (EPA)	DTXSID501347761
- InChI: InChI=1S/C21H27NO2/c1-4-20(23)24-21(17(2)16-22-3,19-13-9-6-10-14-19)15-18-11-7-5-8-12-18/h5-14,17,22H,4,15-16H2,1-3H3/t17-,21+/m1/s1 Key: IKACRWYHQXOSGM-UTKZUKDTSA-N; InChI=1/C21H27NO2/c1-4-20(23)24-21(17(2)16-22-3,19-13-9-6-10-14-19)15-18-11-7-5-8-12-18/h5-14,17,22H,4,15-16H2,1-3H3/t17-,21+/m1/s1 Key: IKACRWYHQXOSGM-UTKZUKDTBF
- SMILES: O=C(O[C@@](c1ccccc1)(Cc2ccccc2)[C@H](C)CNC)CC

Properties
Chemical formula	C_{21}H_{27}NO_{2}
Molar mass	325.445
- Except where otherwise noted, data are given for materials in their standard state (at 25 °C [77 °F], 100 kPa). verify (what is ?) Infobox references

Norpropoxyphene is a major metabolite of the opioid analgesic drug dextropropoxyphene, and is responsible for many of the side effects associated with use of this drug, especially the unusual toxicity seen during dextropropoxyphene overdose. It has weaker analgesic effects than dextropropoxyphene itself, but is a relatively potent pro-convulsant and blocker of sodium and potassium channels, particularly in heart tissue, which produces prolonged intracardiac conduction time and can lead to heart failure following even relatively minor overdoses. The toxicity of this metabolite makes dextropropoxyphene up to 10 times more likely to cause death following overdose compared to other similar mild opioid analgesics, and has led to dextropropoxyphene being withdrawn from the market in some countries.

Because norpropoxyphene has a long half-life in the body of up to 36 hours (compared to around 6–12 hours for dextropropoxyphene), it can accumulate in tissues during chronic use of dextropropoxyphene-containing medications, especially in people whose excretion of drugs is slower than normal such as young children, the elderly, and individuals with reduced kidney or liver function, and so side effects including serious adverse events are more common in these groups and use of dextropropoxyphene should be avoided where possible.
