= 2,4-Dinitrophenylmorphine =

Names
- IUPAC name 3-(2,4-Dinitrophenoxy)-17-methyl-7,8-didehydro-4,5α-epoxymorphinan-6α-ol
- Systematic IUPAC name (4R,4aR,7S,7aR,12bS)-9-(2,4-Dinitrophenoxy)-3-methyl-2,3,4,4a,7,7a-hexahydro-1H-4,12-methano[1]benzofuro[3,2-e]isoquinolin-7-ol

Identifiers
CAS Number	58534-70-6; 63732-56-9 (HCl)
3D model (JSmol)	Interactive image
ChemSpider	4676589
PubChem CID	5745390
UNII	9VEU59XV9R
CompTox Dashboard (EPA)	DTXSID90974089
- InChI: InChI=1S/C23H21N3O7/c1-24-9-8-23-14-4-5-17(27)22(23)33-21-19(6-2-12(20(21)23)10-15(14)24)32-18-7-3-13(25(28)29)11-16(18)26(30)31/h2-7,11,14-15,17,22,27H,8-10H2,1H3/t14-,15+,17-,22-,23-/m0/s1 Key: LRGWIFMZKBJNGI-KARMISDFSA-N; InChI=1/C23H21N3O7/c1-24-9-8-23-14-4-5-17(27)22(23)33-21-19(6-2-12(20(21)23)10-15(14)24)32-18-7-3-13(25(28)29)11-16(18)26(30)31/h2-7,11,14-15,17,22,27H,8-10H2,1H3/t14-,15+,17-,22-,23-/m0/s1 Key: LRGWIFMZKBJNGI-KARMISDFBG
- SMILES: [O-][N+](=O)c6ccc(Oc2c1O[C@@H]4[C@@]35c1c(cc2)C[C@@H](N(CC3)C)[C@@H]5/C=C\[C@@H]4O)c([N+]([O-])=O)c6

Properties
Chemical formula	C_{23}H_{21}N_{3}O_{7}
Molar mass	451.43 g/mol
- Except where otherwise noted, data are given for materials in their standard state (at 25 °C [77 °F], 100 kPa). verify (what is ?) Infobox references

2,4-Dinitrophenylmorphine is an analog of morphine in which a hydroxyl group is substituted with a dinitro phenoxy group.

== Properties ==
Being an analog of morphine, it would be expected to have the same effects on the body as a typical opioid. Also, as dinitrophenol is a metabolic and respiratory stimulant, this morphine derivative was invented in Austria in 1931 as a narcotic analgesic with less potential to depress respiration.
