= Cytochrophin-4 =

Names
- IUPAC name (2S,3R)-2-[[(2S)-2-[[(2S)-1-[(2S)-2-Amino-3-(4-hydroxyphenyl)propanoyl]pyrrolidine-2-carbonyl]amino]-3-phenylpropanoyl]amino]-3-hydroxybutanoic acid
- Other names Cytochrophin; Tyr-Pro-Phe-Thr; L-Tyrosyl-L-prolyl-L-phenylalanyl-L-threonine

Identifiers
CAS Number	97730-74-0
3D model (JSmol)	Interactive image
ChemSpider	112625
PubChem CID	126809
UNII	QMN7TLY6PD
CompTox Dashboard (EPA)	DTXSID70913678
- InChI: InChI=1S/C27H34N4O7/c1-16(32)23(27(37)38)30-24(34)21(15-17-6-3-2-4-7-17)29-25(35)22-8-5-13-31(22)26(36)20(28)14-18-9-11-19(33)12-10-18/h2-4,6-7,9-12,16,20-23,32-33H,5,8,13-15,28H2,1H3,(H,29,35)(H,30,34)(H,37,38)/t16-,20+,21+,22+,23+/m1/s1 Key: ZQJHYRVSKHGGJY-YPKJBDGSSA-N
- SMILES: C[C@H]([C@@H](C(=O)O)NC(=O)[C@H](CC1=CC=CC=C1)NC(=O)[C@@H]2CCCN2C(=O)[C@H](CC3=CC=C(C=C3)O)N)O

Properties
Chemical formula	C_{27}H_{34}N_{4}O_{7}
Molar mass	526.590 g·mol^{−1}
- Except where otherwise noted, data are given for materials in their standard state (at 25 °C [77 °F], 100 kPa). Infobox references

Cytochrophin-4 is an opioid peptide.
