= Fedotozine =

Chemical compound

Clinical data
- Routes of administration: Oral
- ATC code: None

Legal status
- Legal status: In general: non-regulated

Identifiers
- IUPAC name: (2R)-N,N-dimethyl-2-phenyl-1-[(3,4,5-trimethoxybenzyl)oxy]-2-butanamine
- CAS Number: 123618-00-8 133267-27-3 (tartrate)
- PubChem CID: 6918160
- ChemSpider: 5293373
- UNII: F45VW2087W
- ChEMBL: ChEMBL2106275
- CompTox Dashboard (EPA): DTXSID901318556

Chemical and physical data
- Formula: C_{22}H_{31}NO_{4}
- Molar mass: 373.493 g·mol^{−1}
- 3D model (JSmol): Interactive image
- SMILES: O(c1cc(cc(OC)c1OC)COC[C@@](c2ccccc2)(N(C)C)CC)C
- InChI: InChI=1S/C22H31NO4/c1-7-22(23(2)3,18-11-9-8-10-12-18)16-27-15-17-13-19(24-4)21(26-6)20(14-17)25-5/h8-14H,7,15-16H2,1-6H3/t22-/m0/s1; Key:MVKIWCDXKCUDEH-QFIPXVFZSA-N

Fedotozine (INN; JO 1196 for the (-) tartrate salt) is an opioid drug which acts as a peripherally specific selective κ_{1}-opioid receptor agonist with preference for the κ_{1A} subtype. It was under investigation for the treatment of gastrointestinal conditions like irritable bowel syndrome and functional dyspepsia and made it to phase III clinical trials, but ultimately development was discontinued and it was never marketed.

== See also ==
- Asimadoline
- Trimebutine
