= Thevinone =

Names
- Systematic IUPAC name 1-[(5α,7α)-4,5-Epoxy-3,6-dimethoxy-17-methyl-6,14-ethenomorphinan-7-yl]ethanone

Identifiers
| CAS Number | 15358-22-2 |
| 3D model (JSmol) | Interactive image |
| ChemSpider | 76570 |
| ECHA InfoCard | 100.035.796 |
| EC Number | 239-393-0 |
| PubChem CID | 84879 |
| UNII | B7ZY5RF8LJ |
| CompTox Dashboard (EPA) | DTXSID10934781 |
- InChI: InChI=1S/C23H27NO4/c1-13(25)15-12-21-7-8-23(15,27-4)20-22(21)9-10-24(2)17(21)11-14-5-6-16(26-3)19(28-20)18(14)22/h5-8,15,17,20H,9-12H2,1-4H3/t15-,17-,20-,21-,22+,23-/m1/s1 Key: DGSADVAMZWFCMP-LLGZQOTFSA-N
- SMILES: CC(=O)[C@H]1C[C@@]23C=C[C@@]1([C@H]4[C@@]25CCN([C@@H]3CC6=C5C(=C(C=C6)OC)O4)C)OC

Properties
| Chemical formula | C_{23}H_{27}NO_{4} |
| Molar mass | 381.472 g·mol^{−1} |
- Except where otherwise noted, data are given for materials in their standard state (at 25 °C [77 °F], 100 kPa). Infobox references

Thevinone is a derivative of thebaine.
