= Dibutyrylmorphine =

Chemical compound

Clinical data
- Routes of administration: Oral, intravenous, intranasal, sublingual
- ATC code: none

Legal status
- Legal status: AU: S8 (Controlled drug); CA: Schedule I; DE: Anlage I (Authorized scientific use only); UK: Class A

Identifiers
- IUPAC name: 7,8-Didehydro-4,5α-epoxy-17-methylmorphinan-3,6α-diol
- CAS Number: 66641-03-0
- PubChem CID: 5490372
- ChemSpider: 4590341
- CompTox Dashboard (EPA): DTXSID80985220

Chemical and physical data
- Formula: C_{25}H_{31}NO_{5}
- Molar mass: 425.525 g·mol^{−1}
- 3D model (JSmol): Interactive image
- SMILES: CCCC(=O)OC1C=CC2C3CC4=C5C2(C1OC5=C(C=C4)OC(=O)CCC)CCN3C
- InChI: InChI=1S/C25H31NO5/c1-4-6-20(27)29-18-10-8-15-14-17-16-9-11-19(30-21(28)7-5-2)24-25(16,12-13-26(17)3)22(15)23(18)31-24/h8-11,16-17,19,24H,4-7,12-14H2,1-3H3/t16-,17+,19-,24-,25-/m0/s1; Key:DOTAVBXFXPVSAS-OAQLGNTPSA-N

Dibutyrylmorphine (also known as dibutanoylmorphine) is the 3,6-dibutyryl ester of morphine, first synthesized by the CR Alders Wright organization in the United Kingdom in 1875.

In animal studies its potency as an analgesic is higher compared to morphine, but lower than that of heroin.

Its structure is similar to that of other morphine esters such as heroin and nicomorphine. In many countries it is controlled as an ester of a controlled substance.

Esters of morphine were first produced by boiling morphine in acids or acid anhydrides including acetic, formic, propanoic, benzoic, butyric, and others, forming numerous mono-, di-, and tetraesters. Some of these were later researched further by others and some were eventually marketed. They included heroin, the first designer drugs which were produced in the late 1920s to replace heroin when it was outlawed by the League of Nations, medicinal drugs such as nicomorphine and others. Some of the corresponding esters of codeine, dihydrocodeine, dihydromorphine, isocodeine were also developed, such as the cough suppressant nicocodeine. The 3,6-diesters of morphine are drugs with more rapid and complete central nervous system penetration due to increased lipid solubility and other structural considerations.
