= Droxypropine =

Chemical compound

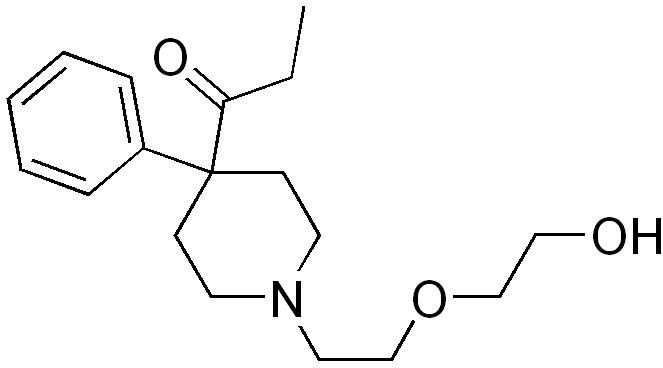

Clinical data
- ATC code: R05DB17 (WHO)

Identifiers
- IUPAC name: 1-[1-[2-(2-hydroxyethoxy)ethyl]-4-phenyl-4-piperidyl]propan-1-one
- CAS Number: 15599-26-5
- PubChem CID: 208903
- DrugBank: DB13436
- ChemSpider: 181001
- UNII: 94J1SMK20X
- KEGG: D07391
- ChEBI: CHEBI:135979
- ChEMBL: ChEMBL2105053
- CompTox Dashboard (EPA): DTXSID60166010

Chemical and physical data
- Formula: C_{18}H_{27}NO_{3}
- Molar mass: 305.418 g·mol^{−1}
- 3D model (JSmol): Interactive image
- SMILES: O=C(C2(c1ccccc1)CCN(CCOCCO)CC2)CC
- InChI: InChI=1S/C18H27NO3/c1-2-17(21)18(16-6-4-3-5-7-16)8-10-19(11-9-18)12-14-22-15-13-20/h3-7,20H,2,8-15H2,1H3; Key:FVYYUBRKVVOOAV-UHFFFAOYSA-N

Droxypropine is a cough suppressant of the phenylpiperidine class.
