= Butinazocine =

Chemical compound

Clinical data
- ATC code: None

Identifiers
- IUPAC name: 10-(3-butyn-1-yl)-13,13-dimethyl-10-azatricyclo[7.3.1.0^{2,7}]trideca-2,4,6-triene-1,4-diol
- CAS Number: 93821-75-1 79810-24-5 (hydrochloride)
- PubChem CID: 189903
- ChemSpider: 164930
- UNII: W11ET455ZI
- ChEMBL: ChEMBL2106183

Chemical and physical data
- Formula: C_{18}H_{23}NO_{2}
- Molar mass: 285.387 g·mol^{−1}
- 3D model (JSmol): Interactive image
- SMILES: OC1=CC=C2C([C@]3(C(C)(C)[C@@H](C2)N(CC3)CCC#C)O)=C1
- InChI: InChI=1S/C18H23NO2/c1-4-5-9-19-10-8-18(21)15-12-14(20)7-6-13(15)11-16(19)17(18,2)3/h1,6-7,12,16,20-21H,5,8-11H2,2-3H3; Key:YEFFVIUQXXNVGG-UHFFFAOYSA-N

Butinazocine (INN) is an opioid analgesic of the benzomorphan family which was never marketed.

== See also ==
- Benzomorphan
