= Allylnorpethidine =

Chemical compound

Clinical data
- Other names: Allylnorpethidine, WIN-7681
- ATC code: none

Identifiers
- IUPAC name: Ethyl 4-phenyl-1-(prop-2-en-1-yl)piperidine-4-carboxylate
- CAS Number: 2372-70-5
- PubChem CID: 16915
- ChemSpider: 16026
- CompTox Dashboard (EPA): DTXSID70178381

Chemical and physical data
- Formula: C_{17}H_{23}NO_{2}
- Molar mass: 273.376 g·mol^{−1}
- 3D model (JSmol): Interactive image
- SMILES: O=C(OCC)C2(c1ccccc1)CCN(C\C=C)CC2
- InChI: InChI=1S/C17H23NO2/c1-3-12-18-13-10-17(11-14-18,16(19)20-4-2)15-8-6-5-7-9-15/h3,5-9H,1,4,10-14H2,2H3; Key:YUNKDDDGCRLMAF-UHFFFAOYSA-N

Allylnorpethidine (WIN-7681) is a 4-phenylpiperidine derivative that is related to the opioid analgesic drug pethidine (meperidine).

Allylnorpethidine is an analogue of pethidine where the N-methyl group has been replaced by allyl. In many other opioid derivatives, placing an allyl substituent on the nitrogen instead of a methyl will reverse the normal opioid effects, to produce μ-opioid antagonists which among other things reverse the respiratory depression caused by opioid agonists such as morphine. This is not true with allylnorpethidine, as while it does partially reverse the respiratory depression produced by morphine it is actually an active analgesic and has no antagonistic properties when administered alone, so is instead a partial agonist.
