= Desocodeine =

Names
- IUPAC name 3-Methoxy-17-methyl-4,5α-epoxymorphinan
- Systematic IUPAC name (4R,4aR,7aS,12bS)-9-Methoxy-3-methyl-2,3,4,4a,5,6,7,7a-octahydro-1H-4,12-methano[1]benzofuro[3,2-e]isoquinoline
- Other names Dihydrodeoxycodeine

Identifiers
CAS Number	3990-01-0
3D model (JSmol)	Interactive image
ChemSpider	4591151
PubChem CID	5492803
UNII	4H4T7H4YKS
CompTox Dashboard (EPA)	DTXSID70960440
- InChI: InChI=1S/C18H23NO2/c1-19-9-8-18-12-4-3-5-15(18)21-17-14(20-2)7-6-11(16(17)18)10-13(12)19/h6-7,12-13,15H,3-5,8-10H2,1-2H3/t12-,13+,15-,18+/m0/s1 Key: ZJWPQUSUXBOTPF-SCGCMHLBSA-N; InChI=1/C18H23NO2/c1-19-9-8-18-12-4-3-5-15(18)21-17-14(20-2)7-6-11(16(17)18)10-13(12)19/h6-7,12-13,15H,3-5,8-10H2,1-2H3/t12-,13+,15-,18+/m0/s1 Key: ZJWPQUSUXBOTPF-SCGCMHLBBV
- SMILES: O(c2c1O[C@@H]5[C@@]34c1c(cc2)C[C@@H](N(CC3)C)[C@@H]4CCC5)C

Properties
Chemical formula	C_{18}H_{23}NO_{2}
Molar mass	285.387 g·mol^{−1}
- Except where otherwise noted, data are given for materials in their standard state (at 25 °C [77 °F], 100 kPa). Infobox references

Desocodeine is a potent semi-synthetic opioid which is the penultimate intermediate in the manufacture of desomorphine from codeine. Desocodeine is a potent analgesic, being as potent as morphine. It is partially metabolized into desomorphine, among others, after parenteral and oral administration.

Since 1936, desocodeine has been classified in the US as a Schedule I controlled substance under the Controlled Substances Act, indicating that the FDA has determined that there are no legal medicinal uses for it.

In Canada, desocodeine is classified as a Schedule I drug under the Controlled Drugs and Substances Act.

Synthesis of desomorphine from codeine
