= Codeine methylbromide =

Chemical compound

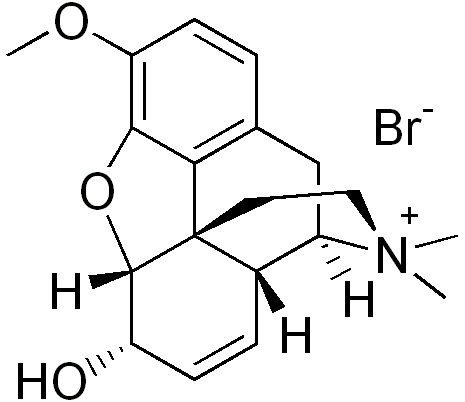

Clinical data
- Other names: Codeine bromomethylate, 125-27-9, DEA No. 9070
- AHFS/Drugs.com: Monograph

Legal status
- Legal status: US: Schedule I

Identifiers
- IUPAC name: 7,8-Didehydro-17,17-dimethyl-4,5-α-epoxy-6α-hydroxy-3-methoxymorphinanium bromide
- CAS Number: 125-27-9
- PubChem CID: 5362447
- ChemSpider: 4515039
- UNII: 25007U9T7H
- CompTox Dashboard (EPA): DTXSID10924985

Chemical and physical data
- Formula: C_{19}H_{24}BrNO_{3}
- Molar mass: 394.309 g·mol^{−1}
- 3D model (JSmol): Interactive image
- SMILES: C[N+]1(CC[C@]23[C@@H]4[C@H]1CC5=C2C(=C(C=C5)OC)O[C@H]3[C@H](C=C4)O)C.[Br-]
- InChI: InChI=1S/C19H24NO3.BrH/c1-20(2)9-8-19-12-5-6-14(21)18(19)23-17-15(22-3)7-4-11(16(17)19)10-13(12)20;/h4-7,12-14,18,21H,8-10H2,1-3H3;1H/q+1;/p-1/t12-,13+,14-,18-,19-;/m0./s1; Key:KIKLDWULAZATJG-YZZSNFJZSA-M

Codeine methylbromide (Eucodin) is the bromomethane (methylbromide) salt of codeine. Its possession is prohibited in many jurisdictions. It is considered a Schedule I controlled substance in the United States, with a DEA ACSCN of 9070 and nil annual aggregate manufacturing quota. as of 2014. As it is used in a different way than basic salts of codeine like the phosphate or hydrochloride owing to its below-mentioned dual action, it is considered to be a different drug related to codeine rather than merely a salt of it in many contexts.

Also known by the genericised trade name eucodeine, and the salt name also sometimes given as methobromide, this drug was first synthesised in Austria-Hungary in 1903. As it is a bromide in addition to a codeine salt, it has a dual mechanism of action and is indicated for pain with insomnia or nervousness and violent coughing. This codeine-based bromide also has morphine, dihydrocodeine, dihydromorphine, hydromorphone, isocodeine, hydrocodone, and other such analogues; also, there are codeine-based barbiturates and salicylates.
