= Β-Methylfentanyl =

Opioid analgesic

β-Methylfentanyl

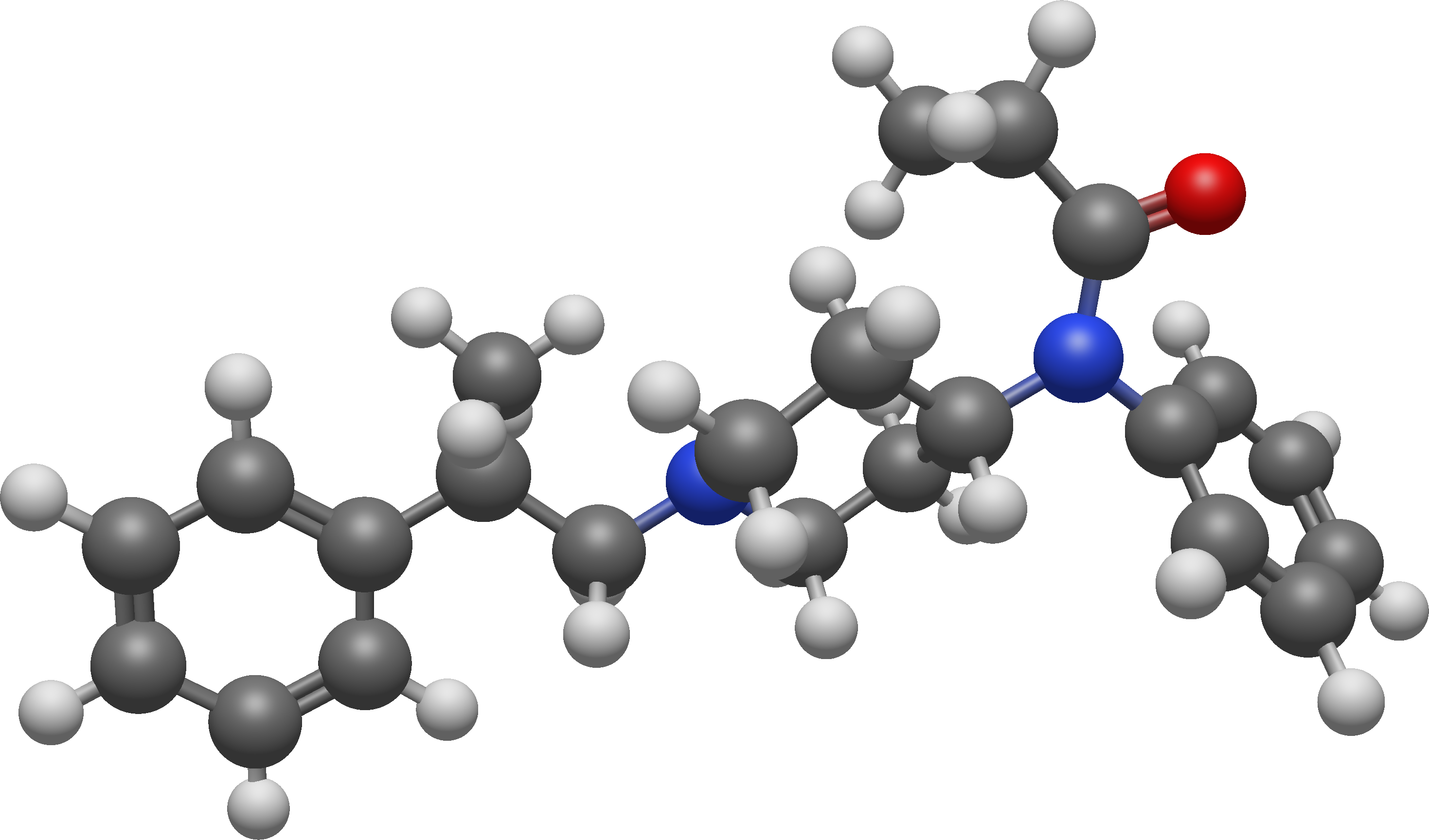

Clinical data
- Other names: β-Methylfentanyl
- ATC code: none

Legal status
- Legal status: US: Schedule I

Identifiers
- IUPAC name: N-Phenyl-N-[1-(2-phenylpropyl)piperidin-4-yl]propanamide
- CAS Number: 79146-56-8
- PubChem CID: 6425761
- ChemSpider: 4931228
- UNII: 9658A8O6GK
- CompTox Dashboard (EPA): DTXSID701018403

Chemical and physical data
- Formula: C_{23}H_{30}N_{2}O
- Molar mass: 350.506 g·mol^{−1}
- 3D model (JSmol): Interactive image
- SMILES: O=C(N(c1ccccc1)C3CCN(CC(c2ccccc2)C)CC3)CC
- InChI: InChI=1S/C23H30N2O/c1-3-23(26)25(21-12-8-5-9-13-21)22-14-16-24(17-15-22)18-19(2)20-10-6-4-7-11-20/h4-13,19,22H,3,14-18H2,1-2H3; Key:UXIGUKSHASXDNI-UHFFFAOYSA-N

β-Methylfentanyl is an opioid analgesic that is an analogue of fentanyl.

β-Methylfentanyl was sold briefly on the black market in the early 1980s, before the introduction of the Federal Analog Act which, for the first time, attempted to control entire families of drugs based on their structural similarity rather than scheduling each drug individually as they appeared.

The chemical structure of fentanyl has been used as a basis in modern chemistry for the discovery and nomenclature of many new fentanyl analogues, sometimes called fentalogs.

β-Methylfentanyl has similar effects to fentanyl. Side effects of fentanyl analogs are similar to those of fentanyl itself, which include itching, nausea and potentially serious respiratory depression, which can be life-threatening. Fentanyl analogs have killed hundreds of people throughout Europe and the former Soviet republics since the most recent resurgence in use began in Estonia in the early 2000s, and novel derivatives continue to appear.
