= Opioid =

Class of analgesic drug

- Drug class
- Chemical structure of morphine, the prototypical opioid.

Class identifiers
- Use: Pain relief
- ATC code: N02A
- Mode of action: Opioid receptor

External links
- MeSH: D000701

Legal status

Opioids are a class of drugs that derive from, or mimic, natural substances found in the opium poppy plant. Opioids work on opioid receptors in the brain and other organs to produce a variety of morphine-like effects, including pain relief.

The terms opioid and opiate are sometimes used interchangeably, but the term opioid is often used to designate all substances, both natural and synthetic, that bind to opioid receptors in the brain, while the term opiate is often used to refer to alkaloid compounds naturally found in the opium poppy plant Papaver somniferum.

Medically they are primarily used for pain relief, including anesthesia. Other medical uses include suppression of diarrhea, replacement therapy for opioid use disorder, and suppressing cough. The opioid receptor antagonist naloxone is used to reverse opioid overdose. Extremely potent opioids such as carfentanil are approved only for veterinary use. Opioids are also frequently used recreationally for their euphoric effects or to prevent withdrawal. Opioids can be fatal, and have been used, alone and in combination, in a small number of executions in the United States.

Side effects of opioids may include itchiness, sedation, nausea, respiratory depression, constipation, and euphoria. Long-term use can cause tolerance, meaning that increased doses are required to achieve the same effect, and physical dependence, meaning that abruptly discontinuing the drug leads to unpleasant withdrawal symptoms. The euphoria attracts recreational use; frequent, escalating recreational use of opioids typically results in addiction. An overdose or concurrent use with other depressant drugs like benzodiazepines can result in death from respiratory depression.

Opioid receptors are found principally in the central and peripheral nervous system and the gastrointestinal tract. These receptors mediate both the psychoactive and the somatic effects of opioids. Some partial agonists, like the anti-diarrhea drug loperamide and antagonists, like naloxegol for opioid-induced constipation, do not cross the blood–brain barrier, but can displace other opioids from binding to receptors in the myenteric plexus. Other agonists and antagonists cross the blood-brain barrier.

Because opioids are addictive and may result in fatal overdose, most are controlled substances. In 2013, between 28 and 38 million people used opioids illicitly (0.6–0.8% of the global population between the ages of 15 and 65). By 2021, that number rose to 60 million. In 2011, an estimated 4 million people in the United States used opioids recreationally or were dependent on them. As of 2015, increased rates of recreational use and addiction are attributed to over-prescription of opioid medications and inexpensive illicit heroin. Conversely, fears about overprescribing, exaggerated side effects, and addiction from opioids are similarly blamed for under-treatment of pain.

Educational video on opioid dependence.

== Terminology ==
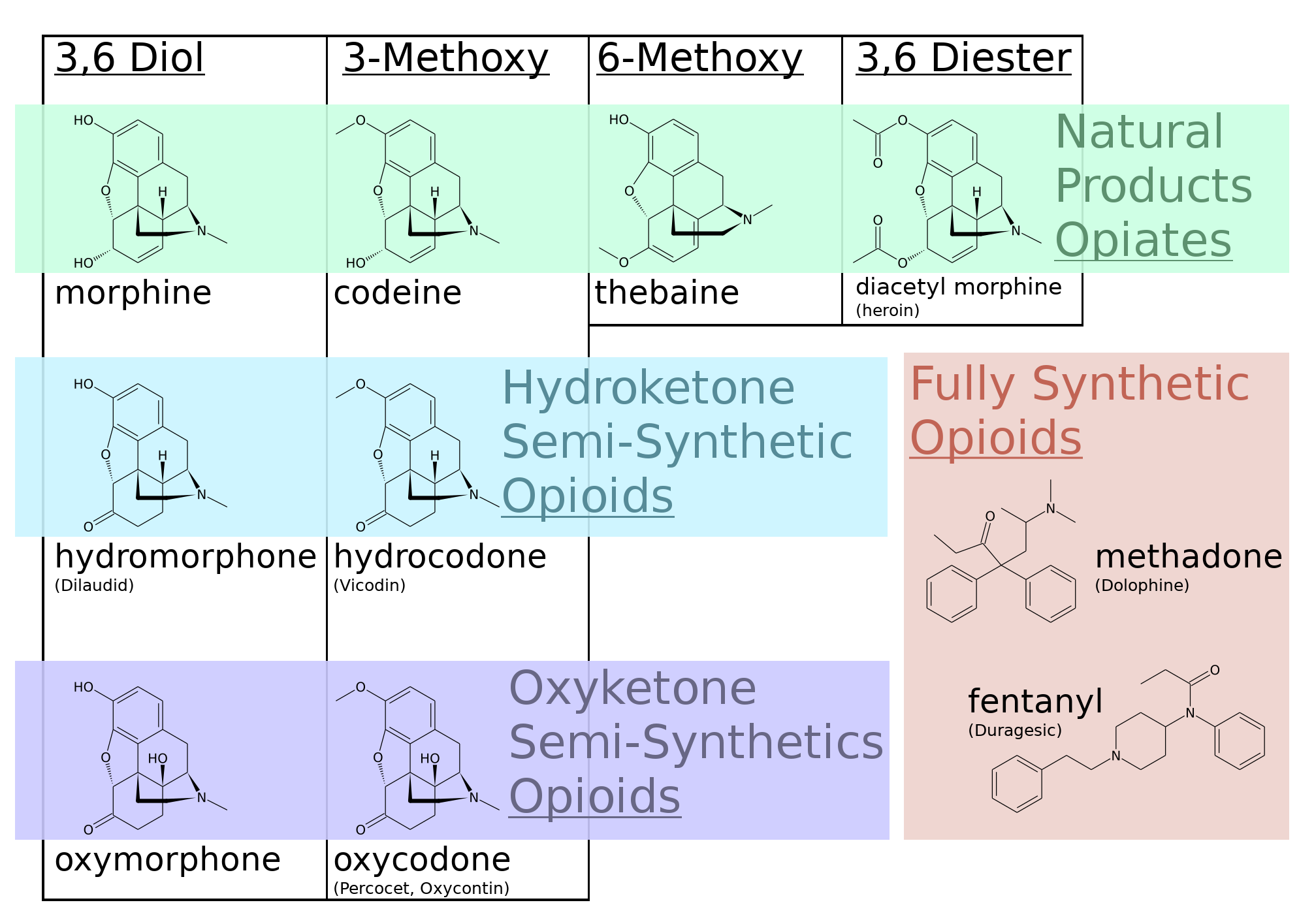
Opiates and opioids with chemical structures indicated. Many classical opiates are also referred to as opioids in modern nomenclature.

Opioids include opiates, an older term that refers to such drugs derived from opium, including morphine itself. Opiate is properly limited to the natural alkaloids found in the resin of the opium poppy although some include semi-synthetic derivatives. Other opioids are semi-synthetic and synthetic drugs such as hydrocodone, oxycodone, and fentanyl; antagonist drugs such as naloxone; and endogenous peptides such as endorphins. The terms opiate and narcotic are sometimes encountered as synonyms for opioid. Narcotic, derived from words meaning 'numbness' or 'sleep', originally referred to any psychoactive compound with numbing or paralyzing properties. As an American legal term, narcotic refers to cocaine and opioids, and their source materials; it is also loosely applied to any illegal or controlled psychoactive drug. In some jurisdictions all controlled drugs are legally classified as narcotics. The term can have pejorative connotations and its use is generally discouraged where that is the case.

== Medical uses ==
=== Pain ===
The weak opioid codeine, in low doses and combined with one or more other drugs, is available in prescription medicines and, in some jurisdictions, without a prescription to treat mild pain. Other opioids are usually reserved for the relief of moderate to severe pain.

==== Acute pain ====
Opioids are effective for the treatment of acute pain (such as pain following surgery). For immediate relief of moderate to severe acute pain, opioids are frequently the treatment of choice due to their rapid onset, efficacy and reduced risk of dependence. However, a 2018 report showed a clear risk of prolonged opioid use when opioid analgesics are initiated for an acute pain management following surgery or trauma. They have also been found to be important in palliative care to help with the severe, chronic, disabling pain that may occur in some terminal conditions such as cancer, and degenerative conditions such as rheumatoid arthritis. In many cases opioids are a successful long-term care strategy for those with chronic cancer pain.

Just over half of all states in the U.S. have enacted laws to restrict prescribing or dispensing opioids for acute pain.

==== Chronic non-cancer pain ====
Guidelines have suggested that the risks of opioids are likely greater than their benefits when used for most non-cancer chronic conditions including headaches, back pain, and fibromyalgia. Thus they should be used cautiously in chronic non-cancer pain. If used, the benefits and harm should be reassessed at least every three months.

For treating chronic pain, opioids are an option after other less risky pain relievers have been considered, including paracetamol or nonsteroidal anti-inflammatory drugs (NSAIDs) like ibuprofen or naproxen. Some types of chronic pain, including the pain caused by fibromyalgia or migraine, are preferentially treated with non-opioid drugs. The efficacy of using opioids to lessen chronic neuropathic pain is uncertain.

Opioids are contraindicated as a first-line treatment for headache because they impair alertness, bring risk of dependence, and increase the risk that episodic headaches will become chronic. Opioids can also cause heightened sensitivity to headache pain. When other treatments fail or are unavailable, opioids may be appropriate for treating headache if the patient can be monitored to prevent the development of chronic headache.

Starting in the late 20th century, there was an increase in the use of opioids in the management of non-malignant chronic pain. This practice has led to a growing problem with addiction and misuse of opioids, the opioid epidemic. Because of negative effects, the use of opioids for long-term management of chronic pain is not indicated unless other less risky pain relievers have been found ineffective. Chronic pain which occurs only periodically, such as that from neuropathic pain, migraines, and fibromyalgia, is better treated with non-opioid medications. Paracetamol and NSAIDs including ibuprofen and naproxen are considered safer alternatives. They are frequently used combined with opioids, such as paracetamol combined with oxycodone (Percocet) and ibuprofen combined with hydrocodone (Vicoprofen), which boosts the pain relief but is also intended to deter recreational use.

=== Other ===
==== Cough ====
Codeine was once viewed as the "gold standard" in cough suppressants, but this position has since been questioned. Some recent placebo-controlled trials have found that it may be no better than a placebo for some causes including acute cough in children. As a consequence, it is not recommended for children. Additionally, there is no evidence that hydrocodone is useful in children. Similarly, a 2012 Dutch guideline regarding the treatment of acute cough does not recommend its use.

Low dose morphine may help chronic cough but its use is limited by side effects.

==== Diarrhea ====
In cases of diarrhea-predominate irritable bowel syndrome, opioids may be used to suppress diarrhea. Loperamide is a peripherally selective opioid available without a prescription used to suppress diarrhea.

The ability to suppress diarrhea also produces constipation when opioids are used beyond several weeks.

==== Shortness of breath ====
Opioids may help with shortness of breath particularly in advanced diseases such as cancer and COPD. However, findings from two recent systematic reviews of the literature found that opioids were not necessarily more effective in treating shortness of breath in patients who have advanced cancer.

==== Restless legs syndrome ====
Though not typically a first line of treatment, opioids such as oxycodone and methadone are sometimes used in the treatment of severe and refractory restless legs syndrome.

== Adverse effects ==
Adverse effects of opioids

Common and short term

- Itching
- Nausea
- Vomiting
- Constipation
- Drowsiness
- Dry mouth

Other

- Cognitive effects
- Opioid dependence
- Dizziness
- Loss of appetite
- Delayed gastric emptying
- Decreased sex drive
- Impaired sexual function
- Decreased testosterone levels
- Depression
- Immunodeficiency
- Increased pain sensitivity
- Irregular menstruation
- Increased risk of falls
- Slowed breathing
- Coma

All of the opioids can cause side effects. Adverse reactions in patients taking opioids include reinforcement disorders, nausea and vomiting, drowsiness, itching, dry mouth, dizziness, and constipation.

In older adults, opioid use is associated with increased adverse effects such as "sedation, nausea, vomiting, constipation, urinary retention, and falls". As a result, older adults taking opioids are at greater risk for injury. Opioids do not cause any specific organ toxicity, unlike many other drugs, such as aspirin and paracetamol. They are not associated with upper gastrointestinal bleeding and kidney toxicity.

Prescription of opioids for acute low back pain and management of osteoarthritis seem to have long-term adverse effects

=== Reinforcement disorders ===
Each year 69,000 people worldwide die of opioid overdose, and 15 million people have an opioid addiction.

According to the US CDC, methadone was involved in 31% of opioid related deaths in the US between 1999–2010 and 40% as the sole drug involved, far higher than other opioids. Studies of long term opioids have found that many stop them, and that minor side effects were common. Addiction occurred in about 0.3%. In the United States in 2016 opioid overdose resulted in the death of 1.7 in 10,000 people.

==== Tolerance ====
Tolerance is a process characterized by neuroadaptations that result in reduced drug effects. While receptor upregulation may often play an important role other mechanisms are also known. Tolerance is more pronounced for some effects than for others; tolerance occurs slowly to the effects on mood, itching, urinary retention, and respiratory depression, but occurs more quickly to the analgesia and other physical side effects. However, tolerance does not develop to constipation or miosis (the constriction of the pupil of the eye to less than or equal to two millimeters). This idea has been challenged, however, with some authors arguing that tolerance does develop to miosis.

Tolerance to opioids is attenuated by a number of substances, including:

- calcium channel blockers
- intrathecal magnesium and zinc
- NMDA antagonists, such as dextromethorphan, ketamine, and memantine.
- cholecystokinin antagonists, such as proglumide
- Newer agents such as the phosphodiesterase inhibitor ibudilast have also been researched for this application.

Tolerance is a physiologic process where the body adjusts to a medication that is frequently present, usually requiring higher doses of the same medication over time to achieve the same effect. It is a common occurrence in individuals taking high doses of opioids for extended periods, but does not predict any relationship to misuse or addiction.

==== Physical dependence ====
Physical dependence is the physiological adaptation of the body to the presence of a substance, in this case opioid medication. It is defined by the development of withdrawal symptoms when the substance is discontinued, when the dose is reduced abruptly or, specifically in the case of opioids, when an antagonist (e.g., naloxone) or an agonist-antagonist (e.g., pentazocine) is administered. Physical dependence is a normal and expected aspect of certain medications and does not necessarily imply that the patient is addicted.

The withdrawal symptoms for opiates may include severe dysphoria, craving for another opiate dose, irritability, sweating, nausea, rhinorrea, tremor, vomiting and myalgia. Slowly reducing the intake of opioids over days and weeks can reduce or eliminate the withdrawal symptoms. The speed and severity of withdrawal depends on the half-life of the opioid; heroin and morphine withdrawal occur more quickly than methadone withdrawal. The acute withdrawal phase is often followed by a protracted phase of depression and insomnia that can last for months. The symptoms of opioid withdrawal can be treated with other medications, such as clonidine. Physical dependence does not predict drug misuse or true addiction, and is closely related to the same mechanism as tolerance. While there are anecdotal claims of benefit with ibogaine, data to support its use in substance dependence is poor.

Critically ill patients who received regular doses of opioids experience iatrogenic withdrawal as a frequent syndrome.

==== Addiction ====
Drug addiction is a complex set of behaviors typically associated with misuse of certain drugs, developing over time and with higher drug dosages. Addiction includes psychological compulsion, to the extent that the affected person persists in actions leading to dangerous or unhealthy outcomes. Opioid addiction includes insufflation or injection, rather than taking opioids orally as prescribed for medical reasons.

In European nations such as Austria, Bulgaria, and Slovakia, slow-release oral morphine formulations are used in opiate substitution therapy (OST) for patients who do not well tolerate the side effects of buprenorphine or methadone. Buprenorphine can also be used together with naloxone for a longer treatment of addiction. In other European countries including the UK, this is also legally used for OST although on a varying scale of acceptance.

Slow-release formulations of medications are intended to curb misuse and lower addiction rates while trying to still provide legitimate pain relief and ease of use to pain patients. Questions remain, however, about the efficacy and safety of these types of preparations. Further tamper resistant medications are currently under consideration with trials for market approval by the FDA.

The amount of evidence available only permits making a weak conclusion, but it suggests that a physician properly managing opioid use in patients with no history of substance use disorder can give long-term pain relief with little risk of developing addiction, or other serious side effects.

Problems with opioids include the following:

1. Some people find that opioids do not relieve all of their pain.
2. Some people find that opioids side effects cause problems which outweigh the therapy's benefit.
3. Some people build tolerance to opioids over time. This requires them to increase their drug dosage to maintain the benefit, and that in turn also increases the unwanted side effects.
4. Long-term opioid use can cause opioid-induced hyperalgesia, which is a condition in which the patient has increased sensitivity to pain.

=== Nausea and vomiting ===
Tolerance to nausea occurs within 7–10 days, during which antiemetics (e.g. low dose haloperidol once at night) are very effective. Due to severe side effects such as tardive dyskinesia, haloperidol is now rarely used. A related drug, prochlorperazine is more often used, although it has similar risks. Stronger antiemetics such as ondansetron or tropisetron are sometimes used when nausea is severe or continuous and disturbing, despite their greater cost. A less expensive alternative is dopamine antagonists such as domperidone and metoclopramide. Domperidone does not cross the blood–brain barrier and produce adverse central antidopaminergic effects, but blocks opioid emetic action in the chemoreceptor trigger zone. This drug is not available in the U.S.

Some antihistamines with anticholinergic properties (e.g. orphenadrine, diphenhydramine) may also be effective. The first-generation antihistamine hydroxyzine is commonly used, with the added advantages of not causing movement disorders, and also possessing analgesic-sparing properties. THC relieves nausea and vomiting; it also produces analgesia that may allow lower doses of opioids with reduced nausea and vomiting.

- 5-HT_{3} antagonists (e.g. ondansetron)
- Dopamine antagonists (e.g. domperidone)
- Anti-cholinergic antihistamines (e.g. diphenhydramine)
- Δ^{9}-tetrahydrocannabinol (e.g. dronabinol)

Vomiting is due to gastric stasis (large volume vomiting, brief nausea relieved by vomiting, oesophageal reflux, epigastric fullness, early satiation), besides direct action on the chemoreceptor trigger zone of the area postrema, the vomiting centre of the brain. Vomiting can thus be prevented by prokinetic agents (e.g. domperidone or metoclopramide). If vomiting has already started, these drugs need to be administered by a non-oral route (e.g. subcutaneous for metoclopramide, rectally for domperidone).

- Prokinetic agents (e.g. domperidone)
- Anti-cholinergic agents (e.g. orphenadrine)

Evidence suggests that opioid-inclusive anaesthesia is associated with postoperative nausea and vomiting.

Patients with chronic pain using opioids had small improvements in pain and physically functioning and increased risk of vomiting.

=== Drowsiness ===
Tolerance to drowsiness usually develops over 5–7 days, but if troublesome, switching to an alternative opioid often helps. Certain opioids such as fentanyl, morphine and diamorphine (heroin) tend to be particularly sedating, while others such as oxycodone, codeine, and tilidine tend to produce comparatively less sedation, but individual patients responses can vary markedly and some degree of trial and error may be needed to find the most suitable drug for a particular patient. Otherwise, treatment with CNS stimulants is generally effective.

- Stimulants (e.g. caffeine, modafinil, amphetamine, methylphenidate)

=== Itching ===
Itching tends not to be a severe problem when opioids are used for pain relief, but antihistamines are useful for counteracting itching when it occurs. Non-sedating antihistamines such as fexofenadine are often preferred as they avoid increasing opioid induced drowsiness. However, some sedating antihistamines such as orphenadrine can produce a synergistic pain relieving effect permitting smaller doses of opioids be used. Consequently, several opioid/antihistamine combination products have been marketed, such as Meprozine (meperidine/promethazine) and Diconal (dipipanone/cyclizine), and these may also reduce opioid induced nausea.

- Antihistamines (e.g. fexofenadine)

=== Constipation ===
Opioid-induced constipation (OIC) develops in 90 to 95% of people taking opioids long-term. Since tolerance to this problem does not generally develop, most people on long-term opioids need to take a laxative and/or enemas.

Treatment of OIC is successional and dependent on severity. The first mode of treatment is non-pharmacological, and includes lifestyle modifications like increasing dietary fiber, fluid intake (around 1.5 L (51 US fl oz) per day), and physical activity. If non-pharmacological measures are ineffective, laxatives, including stool softeners (e.g., polyethylene glycol), bulk-forming laxatives (e.g., fiber supplements), stimulant laxatives (e.g., bisacodyl, senna), and/or enemas, may be used. A common laxative regimen for OIC is the combination of docusate and bisacodyl. Osmotic laxatives, including lactulose, polyethylene glycol, and milk of magnesia (magnesium hydroxide), as well as mineral oil (a lubricant laxative), are also commonly used for OIC.

If laxatives are insufficiently effective (which is often the case), opioid formulations or regimens that include a peripherally-selective opioid antagonist, such as methylnaltrexone bromide, naloxegol, alvimopan, or naloxone (as in oxycodone/naloxone), may be tried. A 2018 (updated in 2022) Cochrane review found that the evidence was moderate for alvimopan, naloxone, or methylnaltrexone bromide but with increased risk of adverse events. Naloxone by mouth appears to be the most effective. A daily 0.2 mg dose of naldemedine has been shown to significantly improve symptoms in patients with OIC.

Opioid rotation is one method suggested to minimise the impact of constipation in long-term users. While all opioids cause constipation, there are some differences between drugs, with studies suggesting tramadol, tapentadol, methadone and fentanyl may cause relatively less constipation, while with codeine, morphine, oxycodone or hydromorphone constipation may be comparatively more severe.

=== Respiratory depression ===
Respiratory depression is the most serious adverse reaction associated with opioid use, but it usually is seen with the use of a single, intravenous dose in an opioid-naïve patient. In patients taking opioids regularly for pain relief, tolerance to respiratory depression occurs rapidly, so that it is not a clinical problem. Several drugs have been developed which can partially block respiratory depression, although the only respiratory stimulant currently approved for this purpose is doxapram, which has only limited efficacy in this application. Newer drugs such as BIMU-8 and CX-546 may be much more effective.

- Respiratory stimulants: carotid chemoreceptor agonists (e.g. doxapram), 5-HT_{4} agonists (e.g. BIMU8), δ-opioid agonists (e.g. BW373U86) and AMPAkines (e.g. CX717) can all reduce respiratory depression caused by opioids without affecting analgesia, but most of these drugs are only moderately effective or have side effects which preclude use in humans. 5-HT_{1A} agonists such as 8-OH-DPAT and repinotan also counteract opioid-induced respiratory depression, but at the same time reduce analgesia, which limits their usefulness for this application.
- Opioid antagonists (e.g. naloxone, nalmefene, diprenorphine)

The initial 24 hours after opioid administration appear to be the most critical with regard to life-threatening OIRD, but may be preventable with a more cautious approach to opioid use.

Patients with cardiac, respiratory disease and/or obstructive sleep apnoea are at increased risk for OIRD.

=== Increased pain sensitivity ===
Opioid-induced hyperalgesia – where individuals using opioids to relieve pain paradoxically experience more pain as a result of that medication – has been observed in some people. This phenomenon, although uncommon, is seen in some people receiving palliative care, most often when dose is increased rapidly. If encountered, rotation between several different opioid pain medications may decrease the development of increased pain. Opioid induced hyperalgesia more commonly occurs with chronic use or brief high doses, but some research suggests that it may also occur with small doses.

Side effects such as hyperalgesia and allodynia, sometimes accompanied by a worsening of neuropathic pain, may be consequences of long-term treatment with opioid analgesics, especially when increasing tolerance has resulted in loss of efficacy and consequent progressive dose escalation over time. This appears to largely be a result of actions of opioid drugs at targets other than the three classic opioid receptors, including the nociceptin receptor, sigma receptor and Toll-like receptor 4, and can be counteracted in animal models by antagonists at these targets such as J-113,397, BD-1047 or (+)-naloxone respectively. No drugs are currently approved specifically for counteracting opioid-induced hyperalgesia in humans and in severe cases the only solution may be to discontinue use of opioid analgesics and replace them with non-opioid analgesic drugs. However, since individual sensitivity to the development of this side effect is highly dose dependent and may vary depending which opioid analgesic is used, many patients can avoid this side effect simply through dose reduction of the opioid drug (usually accompanied by the addition of a supplemental non-opioid analgesic), rotating between different opioid drugs, or by switching to a milder opioid with a mixed mode of action that also counteracts neuropathic pain, particularly tramadol or tapentadol.

- NMDA receptor antagonists such as ketamine
- SNRIs such as milnacipran
- Anticonvulsants such as gabapentin or pregabalin

=== Other adverse effects ===
==== Low sex hormone levels ====
Clinical studies have consistently associated medical and recreational opioid use with hypogonadism (low sex hormone levels) in different sexes. The effect is dose-dependent. Most studies suggest that the majority (perhaps as much as 90%) of chronic opioid users develop hypogonadism. A 2015 systematic review and meta-analysis found that opioid therapy suppressed testosterone levels in men by about 165 ng/dL (5.7 nmol/L) on average, which was a reduction in testosterone level of almost 50%. Conversely, opioid therapy did not significantly affect testosterone levels in women. However, opioids can also interfere with menstruation in women by limiting the production of luteinizing hormone (LH). Opioid-induced hypogonadism likely causes the strong association of opioid use with osteoporosis and bone fracture, due to deficiency in estradiol. It also may increase pain and thereby interfere with the intended clinical effect of opioid treatment. Opioid-induced hypogonadism is likely caused by their agonism of opioid receptors in the hypothalamus and the pituitary gland. One study found that the depressed testosterone levels of heroin addicts returned to normal within one month of abstinence, suggesting that the effect is readily reversible and is not permanent. As of 2013, the effect of low-dose or acute opioid use on the endocrine system is unclear. Long-term use of opioids can affect the other hormonal systems as well.

==== Disruption of work ====
Use of opioids may be a risk factor for failing to return to work.

Persons performing any safety-sensitive task should not use opioids. Health care providers should not recommend that workers who drive or use heavy equipment including cranes or forklifts treat chronic or acute pain with opioids. Workplaces which manage workers who perform safety-sensitive operations should assign workers to less sensitive duties for so long as those workers are treated by their physician with opioids.

People who take opioids long term have increased likelihood of being unemployed. Taking opioids may further disrupt the patient's life and the adverse effects of opioids themselves can become a significant barrier to patients having an active life, gaining employment, and sustaining a career.

In addition, lack of employment may be a predictor of aberrant use of prescription opioids.

==== Increased accident-proneness ====
Opioid use may increase accident-proneness. Opioids may increase risk of traffic accidents and accidental falls.

==== Reduced attention ====
Opioids have been shown to reduce attention, more so when used with antidepressants or anticonvulsants.

==== Rare side effects ====
Infrequent adverse reactions in patients taking opioids for pain relief include: dose-related respiratory depression (especially with more potent opioids), confusion, hallucinations, delirium, urticaria, hypothermia, bradycardia/tachycardia, orthostatic hypotension, dizziness, headache, urinary retention, ureteric or biliary spasm, muscle rigidity, myoclonus (with high doses), and flushing (due to histamine release, except fentanyl and remifentanil). Both therapeutic and chronic use of opioids can compromise the function of the immune system. Opioids decrease the proliferation of macrophage progenitor cells and lymphocytes, and affect cell differentiation (Roy & Loh, 1996). Opioids may also inhibit leukocyte migration. However the relevance of this in the context of pain relief is not known.

==== Pregnancy ====
Opioid use during pregnancy can have significant implications for both the mother and the developing fetus.

Opioids are a class of drugs that include prescription painkillers (e.g., oxycodone, hydrocodone) and illicit substances like heroin. Opioid use during pregnancy is associated with an increased risk of complications, including an elevated risk of preterm birth, low birth weight, intrauterine growth restriction, and stillbirth. Opioids are substances that can cross the placenta, exposing the developing fetus to the drugs. This exposure can potentially lead to various adverse effects on fetal development, including an increased risk of birth defects. One of the most well-known consequences of maternal opioid use during pregnancy is the risk of neonatal abstinence syndrome (NAS). NAS occurs when the newborn experiences withdrawal symptoms after birth due to exposure to opioids in the womb. Maternal opioid use during pregnancy can also have long-term effects on the child's development. These effects may include cognitive and behavioral problems, as well as an increased risk of substance use disorders later in life. Current guidelines recommend that opioid use disorder in pregnancy be treated with opioid agonist pharmacotherapy consisting of methadone or buprenorphine to substitute for the drug of abuse.

== Interactions ==
Physicians treating patients using opioids in combination with other drugs keep continual documentation that further treatment is indicated and remain aware of opportunities to adjust treatment if the patient's condition changes to merit less risky therapy.

=== With other depressant drugs ===
The concurrent use of opioids with other depressant drugs such as benzodiazepines or ethanol increases the rates of adverse events and overdose. Despite this, opioids and benzodiazepines are concurrently dispensed in many settings. As with an overdose of opioid alone, the combination of an opioid and another depressant may precipitate respiratory depression often leading to death. These risks are lessened with close monitoring by a physician, who may conduct ongoing screening for changes in patient behavior and treatment compliance.

=== Opioid antagonist ===
Opioid effects (adverse or otherwise) can be reversed with an opioid antagonist such as naloxone or naltrexone. These competitive antagonists bind to the opioid receptors with higher affinity than agonists but do not activate the receptors. This displaces the agonist, attenuating or reversing the agonist effects. However, the elimination half-life of naloxone can be shorter than that of the opioid itself, so repeat dosing or continuous infusion may be required, or a longer acting antagonist such as nalmefene may be used. In patients taking opioids regularly who receive opioid antagonists under medical supervision, it is essential that the opioid is only partially reversed to avoid a severe and distressing reaction of waking in excruciating pain. This is achieved by not giving a full dose but giving this in small doses until the respiratory rate has improved. An infusion is then started to keep the reversal at that level, while maintaining pain relief. Opioid antagonists remain the standard treatment for respiratory depression following opioid overdose, with naloxone being by far the most commonly used, although the longer acting antagonist nalmefene may be used for treating overdoses of long-acting opioids such as methadone, and diprenorphine is used for reversing the effects of extremely potent opioids used in veterinary medicine such as etorphine and carfentanil. However, since opioid antagonists also block the beneficial effects of opioid analgesics, they are generally useful only for treating overdose, with use of opioid antagonists alongside opioid analgesics to reduce side effects, requiring careful dose titration and often being poorly effective at doses low enough to allow analgesia to be maintained.

Naltrexone does not appear to increase risk of serious adverse events, which confirms the safety of oral naltrexone. Mortality or serious adverse events due to rebound toxicity in patients with naloxone were rare.

== Pharmacology ==
Opioid comparison
Drug	Relative Potency	Nonionized Fraction	Protein Binding	Lipid Solubility
Morphine	1	++	+++	+++
Pethidine (meperidine)	0.1	+	+++	+++
Hydromorphone	10		+	+++
Alfentanil	10–25	++++	++++	+++
Fentanyl	50–100	+	+++	++++
Remifentanil	250	+++	+++	++
Sufentanil	500–1000	++	++++	++++
Etorphine	1000–3000			
Carfentanil	10000			

Opioids bind to specific opioid receptors in the nervous system and other tissues. There are three principal classes of opioid receptors, μ, κ, δ (mu, kappa, and delta), although up to seventeen have been reported, and include the ε, ι, λ, and ζ (Epsilon, Iota, Lambda and Zeta) receptors. Conversely, σ (Sigma) receptors are no longer considered to be opioid receptors because their activation is not reversed by the opioid inverse-agonist naloxone, they do not exhibit high-affinity binding for classical opioids, and they are stereoselective for dextro-rotatory isomers while the other opioid receptors are stereo-selective for levo-rotatory isomers. In addition, there are three subtypes of μ-receptor: μ_{1} and μ_{2}, and the newly discovered μ_{3}. Another receptor of clinical importance is the opioid-receptor-like receptor 1 (ORL1), which is involved in pain responses as well as having a major role in the development of tolerance to μ-opioid agonists used as analgesics. These are all G-protein coupled receptors acting on GABAergic neurotransmission.

Locants of the morphine molecule

The pharmacodynamic response to an opioid depends upon the receptor to which it binds, its affinity for that receptor, and whether the opioid is an agonist or an antagonist. For example, the supraspinal analgesic properties of the opioid agonist morphine are mediated by activation of the μ_{1} receptor; respiratory depression and physical dependence by the μ_{2} receptor; and sedation and spinal analgesia by the κ receptor. Each group of opioid receptors elicits a distinct set of neurological responses, with the receptor subtypes (such as μ_{1} and μ_{2} for example) providing even more [measurably] specific responses. Unique to each opioid is its distinct binding affinity to the various classes of opioid receptors (e.g. the μ, κ, and δ opioid receptors are activated at different magnitudes according to the specific receptor binding affinities of the opioid). For example, the opiate alkaloid morphine exhibits high-affinity binding to the μ-opioid receptor, while ketazocine exhibits high affinity to ĸ receptors. It is this combinatorial mechanism that allows for such a wide class of opioids and molecular designs to exist, each with its own unique effect profile. Their individual molecular structure is also responsible for their different duration of action, whereby metabolic breakdown (such as N-dealkylation) is responsible for opioid metabolism.

INTA: selective agonist of KOR-DOR and KOR-MOR heteromers. Does not recruit β-arrestin II. Antinociceptive devoid of aversion, tolerance, and dependence in mice.

=== Functional selectivity ===
A new strategy of drug development takes receptor signal transduction into consideration. This strategy strives to increase the activation of desirable signalling pathways while reducing the impact on undesirable pathways. This differential strategy has been given several names, including functional selectivity and biased agonism. The first opioid that was intentionally designed as a biased agonist and placed into clinical evaluation is the drug oliceridine. It displays analgesic activity and reduced adverse effects.

=== Opioid comparison ===
Extensive research has been conducted to determine equivalence ratios comparing the relative potency of opioids. Given a dose of an opioid, an equianalgesic table is used to find the equivalent dosage of another. Such tables are used in opioid rotation practices, and to describe an opioid by comparison to morphine, the reference opioid. Equianalgesic tables typically list drug half-lives, and sometimes equianalgesic doses of the same drug by means of administration, such as morphine: oral and intravenous.

=== Binding profiles ===
Binding profiles of opioids at opioid receptors (K_{i}, nM)
Compound	MOR	DOR	KOR	Ref
3-HO-PCP	60	2,300	140	
7-Hydroxymitragynine	13.5	155	123	
β-Chlornaltrexamine	0.90	115	0.083	
β-Endorphin	1.0	1.0	52	
β-Funaltrexamine	0.33	48	2.8	
(+)-cis-3-methylfentanyl	0.24	ND	ND	
Alazocine	2.7	4.1	3.2	
(−)-Alazocine	3.0	15	4.7	
(+)-Alazocine	1,900	19,000	1,600	
Alfentanil	39	21,200	ND	
Binaltorphimine	1.3	5.8	0.79	
BNTX	18	0.66	55	
Bremazocine	0.75	2.3	0.089	
(−)-Bremazocine	0.62	0.78	0.075	
Buprenorphine	4.18	25.8	12.9	
Butorphanol	1.7	13	7.4	
BW-3734	26	0.013	17	
Carfentanil	0.024	3.3	43	
Cebranopadol	0.7	18	2.6	
Codeine	79	>1,000	>1,000	
CTOP	0.18	>1,000	>1,000	
Cyclazocine	0.45	6.3	5.9	
Cyprodime	9.4	356	176	
DADLE	16	0.74	>1,000	
DAMGO	2.0	>1,000	>1,000	
[D-Ala^{2}]Deltorphin II	>1,000	3.3	>1,000	
Dermorphin	0.33	>1,000	>1,000	
(+)-Desmetramadol (O-DSMT)	17	690	1,800	
Dextropropoxyphene	34.5	380	1,220	
Dezocine	3.6	290	460	
Dihydroetorphine	0.45	1.82	0.57	
Dihydromorphine	2.5	137	223	
Diprenorphine	0.072	0.23	0.017	
DPDPE	>1,000	14	>1,000	
DSLET	39	4.8	>1,000	
Dynorphin A	32	>1,000	0.5	
Ethylketazocine	3.1	101	0.40	
(−)-Ethylketazocine	2.3	5.2	2.2	
(+)-Ethylketazocine	2,500	>10,000	1,600	
Etorphine	0.23	1.4	0.13	
Fentanyl	0.39	>1,000	255	
Hydrocodone	11.1	962	501	
Hydromorphone	0.47	18.5	24.9	
ICI-204488	>1,000	>1,000	0.71	
Leu-enkephalin	3.4	4.0	>1,000	
Levacetylmethadol	9.86	169	1,020	
Lofentanil	0.68	5.5	5.9	
Met-enkephalin	0.65	1.7	>1,000	
Metazocine	3.8	44.3	13.3	
Methadone	1.7	435	405	
Dextromethadone	19.7	960	1,370	
Levomethadone	0.945	371	1,860	
Methallorphan	ND	ND	ND	ND
Dextrallorphan	1,140	2,660	34.6	
Levallorphan	0.213	2.18	1,100	
Methorphan	ND	ND	ND	ND
Dextromethorphan	1,280	11,500	7,000	
Levomethorphan	11.2	249	225	
Mitragynine	7.24	60.3	1,100	
Mitragynine pseudoindoxyl	0.087	3.02	79.4	
Morphanol	ND	ND	ND	ND
Dextrorphan	420	34,700	5,950	
Levorphanol	0.42	3.61	4.2	
Morphiceptin	56	>1,000	>1,000	
Morphine	1.8	90	317	
Morphine, (−)-	1.24	145	23.4	
Morphine, (+)-	>10,000	>100,000	>300,000	
MR-2266	1.0	3.0	0.16	
Nalbuphine	11	>1,000	3.9	
Nalmefene	0.24	16	0.083	
Nalorphine	0.97	148	1.1	
Naloxonazine	0.054	8.6	11	
Naloxone	1.1	16	12	
(−)-Naloxone	0.93	17	2.3	
(+)-Naloxone	>1,000	>1,000	>1,000	
Naltrexone	1.0	149	3.9	
Naltriben	12	0.013	13	
Naltrindole	64	0.02	66	
Norbinaltorphimine	2.2	65	0.027	
Normorphine	4.0	310	149	
Ohmefentanyl	0.0079	10	32	
Oxycodone	8.69	901	1,350	
Oxymorphindole	111	0.7	228	
Oxymorphone	0.78	50	137	
Pentazocine	5.7	31	7.2	
Pethidine (meperidine)	385	4,350	5,140	
Phenazocine	0.20	5.0	2.0	
PLO17	30	>1,000	>1,000	
Quadazocine	0.99	2.6	0.5	
Salvinorin A	>10,000	>10,000	16	
Samidorphan	0.052	2.6	0.23	
SIOM	33	1.7	>1,000	
Spiradoline	21	>1,000	0.036	
SR-17018	11	>10,000	68	
Sufentanil	0.15	50	75	
Tianeptine	383	>10,000	>10,000	
Tifluadom	32	189	2.1	
Tramadol	2,120	57,700	42,700	
(+)-Tramadol	1,330	62,400	54,000	
(−)-Tramadol	24,800	213,000	53,500	
U-47700	11.1	1,220	287	
U-50488	>1,000	>1,000	0.12	
U-69593	>1,000	>1,000	0.59	
U-77891	2	105	2,300	
Xorphanol	0.25	1.0	0.4	
Values are K_{i} (nM), unless otherwise noted. The smaller the value, the more strongly the drug binds to the site. Assays were done mostly with cloned or cultured rodent receptors.

== Usage ==
Global estimates of drug users in 2016 (in millions of users)
Substance	Best estimate	Low estimate	High estimate
Amphetamine- type stimulants	34.16	13.42	55.24
Cannabis	192.15	165.76	234.06
Cocaine	18.20	13.87	22.85
Ecstasy	20.57	8.99	32.34
Opiates	19.38	13.80	26.15
Opioids	34.26	27.01	44.54

Opioid prescriptions in the US increased from 76 million in 1991 to 207 million in 2013.

In the 1990s, opioid prescribing increased significantly. Once used almost exclusively for the treatment of acute pain or pain due to cancer, opioids are now prescribed liberally for people experiencing chronic pain. This has been accompanied by rising rates of accidental addiction and accidental overdoses leading to death. According to the International Narcotics Control Board, the United States and Canada lead the per capita consumption of prescription opioids. The number of opioid prescriptions per capita in the United States and Canada is double the consumption in the European Union, Australia, and New Zealand. Certain populations have been affected by the opioid addiction crisis more than others, including First World communities and low-income populations. Public health specialists say that this may result from the unavailability or high cost of alternative methods for addressing chronic pain. Opioids have been described as a cost-effective treatment for chronic pain, but the impact of the opioid epidemic and deaths caused by opioid overdoses should be considered in assessing their cost-effectiveness. Data from 2017 suggest that in the U.S. about 3.4 percent of the U.S. population are prescribed opioids for daily pain management. Calls for opioid deprescribing have led to broad scale opioid tapering practices with little scientific evidence to support the safety or benefit for patients with chronic pain.

== History ==
=== Naturally occurring opioids ===
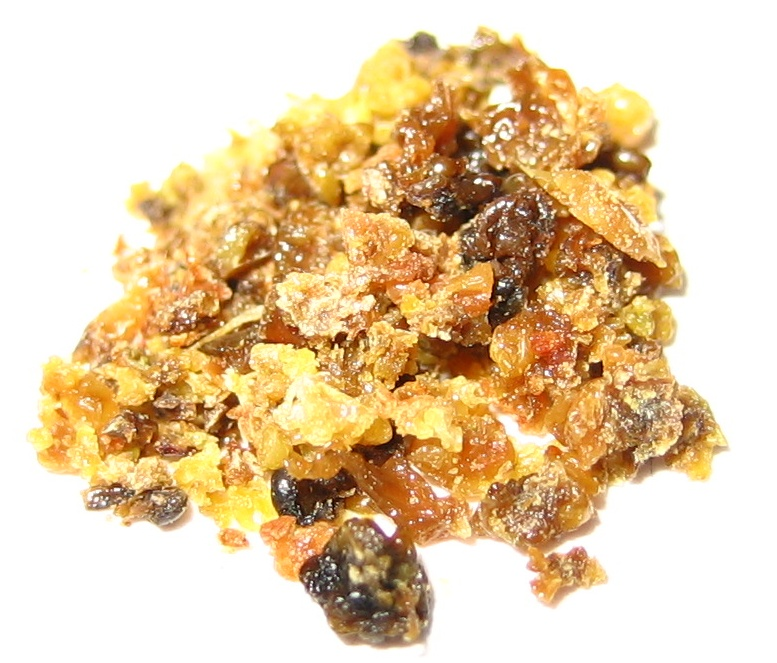
A sample of raw opium

Opioids are among the world's oldest known drugs. The earliest known evidence of Papaver somniferum in a human archaeological site dates to the Neolithic period around 5,700–5,500 BCE. Its seeds have been found at Cueva de los Murciélagos in the Iberian Peninsula and La Marmotta in the Italian Peninsula.

Use of the opium poppy for medical, recreational, and religious purposes can be traced to the fourth century BC, when ideograms on Sumerians clay tablets mention the use of "Hul Gil", a "plant of joy". Opium was known to the Egyptians, and is mentioned in the Ebers Papyrus as an ingredient in a mixture for the soothing of children, and for the treatment of breast abscesses.

Opium was also known to the Greeks. It was valued by Hippocrates (c. 460 – c. 370 BC) and his students for its sleep-inducing properties, and used for the treatment of pain. The Latin saying "Sedare dolorem opus divinum est", trans. "Alleviating pain is the work of the divine", has been variously ascribed to Hippocrates and to Galen of Pergamum. The medical use of opium is later discussed by Pedanius Dioscorides (c. 40 – 90 AD), a Greek physician serving in the Roman army, in his five-volume work, De Materia Medica.

During the Islamic Golden Age, the use of opium was discussed in detail by Avicenna (c. 980 – June 1037 AD) in The Canon of Medicine. The book's five volumes include information on opium's preparation, an array of physical effects, its use to treat a variety of illness, contraindications for its use, its potential danger as a poison and its potential for addiction. Avicenna discouraged opium's use except as a last resort, preferring to address the causes of pain rather than trying to minimize it with analgesics. Many of Avicenna's observations have been supported by modern medical research.

Exactly when the world became aware of opium in India and China is uncertain, but opium was mentioned in the Chinese medical work Kaibao Bencao (973 AD) By 1590 AD, opium poppies were a staple spring crop in the Subahs of Agra region.

The physician Paracelsus (c. 1493–1541) is often credited with reintroducing opium into medical use in Western Europe, during the German Renaissance. He extolled opium's benefits for medical use. He also claimed to have an "arcanum", a pill which he called laudanum, that was superior to all others, particularly when death was to be cheated. ("Ich hab' ein Arcanum – heiss' ich Laudanum, ist über das Alles, wo es zum Tode reichen will.") Later writers have asserted that Paracelsus' recipe for laudanum contained opium, but its composition remains unknown.

=== Laudanum ===
The term laudanum was used generically for a useful medicine until the 17th century. After Thomas Sydenham introduced the first liquid tincture of opium, "laudanum" came to mean a mixture of both opium and alcohol. Sydenham's 1669 recipe for laudanum mixed opium with wine, saffron, clove and cinnamon. Sydenham's laudanum was used widely in both Europe and the Americas until the 20th century. Other popular medicines, based on opium, included Paregoric, a much milder liquid preparation for children; Black-drop, a stronger preparation; and Dover's powder.

=== The opium trade ===
Opium became a major colonial commodity, moving legally and illegally through trade networks involving India, the Portuguese, the Dutch, the British and China, among others. The British East India Company saw the opium trade as an investment opportunity in 1683 AD. In 1773 the Governor of Bengal established a monopoly on the production of Bengal opium, on behalf of the East India Company. The cultivation and manufacture of Indian opium was further centralized and controlled through a series of acts, between 1797 and 1949. The British balanced an economic deficit from the importation of Chinese tea by selling Indian opium which was smuggled into China in defiance of Chinese government bans. This led to the First (1839–1842) and Second Opium Wars (1856–1860) between China and Britain.

=== Morphine ===
In the 19th century, two major scientific advances were made that had far-reaching effects. Around 1804, German pharmacist Friedrich Sertürner isolated morphine from opium. He described its crystallization, structure, and pharmacological properties in a well-received paper in 1817. Morphine was the first alkaloid to be isolated from any medicinal plant, the beginning of modern scientific drug discovery.

The second advance, nearly fifty years later, was the refinement of the hypodermic needle by Alexander Wood and others. Development of a glass syringe with a subcutaneous needle made it possible to easily administer controlled measurable doses of a primary active compound.

Morphine was initially hailed as a wonder drug for its ability to ease pain. It could help people sleep, and had other useful side effects, including control of coughing and diarrhea. It was widely prescribed by doctors, and dispensed without restriction by pharmacists. During the American Civil War, opium and laudanum were used extensively to treat soldiers. It was also prescribed frequently for women, for menstrual pain and diseases of a "nervous character". At first it was assumed (wrongly) that this new method of application would not be addictive.

=== Codeine ===
Codeine was discovered in 1832 by Pierre Jean Robiquet. Robiquet was reviewing a method for morphine extraction, described by Scottish chemist William Gregory (1803–1858). Processing the residue left from Gregory's procedure, Robiquet isolated a crystalline substance from the other active components of opium. He wrote of his discovery: "Here is a new substance found in opium ... We know that morphine, which so far has been thought to be the only active principle of opium, does not account for all the effects and for a long time the physiologists are claiming that there is a gap that has to be filled." His discovery of the alkaloid led to the development of a generation of antitussive and antidiarrheal medicines based on codeine.

=== Semi-synthetic and synthetic opioids ===
Synthetic opioids were invented, and biological mechanisms for their actions discovered, in the 20th century. Scientists have searched for non-addictive forms of opioids, but have created stronger ones instead. In England Charles Romley Alder Wright developed hundreds of opiate compounds in his search for a nonaddictive opium derivative. In 1874 he became the first person to synthesize diamorphine (heroin), using a process called acetylation which involved boiling morphine with acetic anhydride for several hours.

Heroin received little attention until it was independently synthesized by Felix Hoffmann (1868–1946), working for Heinrich Dreser (1860–1924) at Bayer Laboratories. Dreser brought the new drug to market as an analgesic and a cough treatment for tuberculosis, bronchitis, and asthma in 1898. Bayer ceased production in 1913, after heroin's addictive potential was recognized.

Several semi-synthetic opioids were developed in Germany in the 1910s. The first, oxymorphone, was synthesized from thebaine, an opioid alkaloid in opium poppies, in 1914. Next, Martin Freund and Edmund Speyer developed oxycodone, also from thebaine, at the University of Frankfurt in 1916. In 1920, hydrocodone was prepared by Carl Mannich and Helene Löwenheim, deriving it from codeine. In 1924, hydromorphone was synthesized by adding hydrogen to morphine. Etorphine was synthesized in 1960, from the oripavine in opium poppy straw. Buprenorphine was discovered in 1972.

The first fully synthetic opioid was meperidine (Demerol), found serendipitously by German chemist Otto Eisleb (or Eislib) at IG Farben in 1932. Meperidine was the first opioid to have a structure unrelated to morphine, but with opioid-like properties. Its analgesic effects were discovered by Otto Schaumann in 1939. Gustav Ehrhart and Max Bockmühl, also at IG Farben, built on the work of Eisleb and Schaumann. They developed "Hoechst 10820" (later methadone) around 1937. In 1959 the Belgian physician Paul Janssen developed fentanyl, a synthetic opioid with 30 to 50 times the potency of heroin. Nearly 150 synthetic opioids are now known.

=== Criminalization and medical use ===
Non-clinical use of opium was criminalized in the United States by the Harrison Narcotics Tax Act of 1914, and by many other laws. The use of opioids was stigmatized, and it was seen as a dangerous substance, to be prescribed only as a last resort for dying patients. The Controlled Substances Act of 1970 eventually relaxed the harshness of the Harrison Act.

In the United Kingdom the 1926 report of the Departmental Committee on Morphine and Heroin Addiction under the Chairmanship of the President of the Royal College of Physicians reasserted medical control and established the "British system" of control—which lasted until the 1960s.

In the 1980s the World Health Organization published guidelines for prescribing drugs, including opioids, for different levels of pain. With little or no scientific evidence to support their claims, industry scientists and advocates suggested that people with chronic pain would be resistant to addiction.

The release of OxyContin in 1996 was accompanied by an aggressive marketing campaign promoting the use of opioids for pain relief. Increasing prescription of opioids fueled a growing black market for heroin. Between 2000 and 2014 there was an "alarming increase in heroin use across the country and an epidemic of drug overdose deaths".

As a result, health care organizations and public health groups, such as Physicians for Responsible Opioid Prescribing, have called for decreases in the prescription of opioids. In 2016, the Centers for Disease Control and Prevention (CDC) issued a new set of guidelines for the prescription of opioids "for chronic pain outside of active cancer treatment, palliative care, and end-of-life care" and the increase of opioid tapering.

== Society and culture ==
=== Definition ===
The term "opioid" originated in the 1950s. It combines "opium" + "-oid" meaning "opiate-like" ("opiates" being morphine and similar drugs derived from opium). The first scientific publication to use it, in 1963, included a footnote stating, "In this paper, the term, 'opioid', is used in the sense originally proposed by George H. Acheson (personal communication) to refer to any chemical compound with morphine-like activities". By the late 1960s, research found that opiate effects are mediated by activation of specific molecular receptors in the nervous system, which were termed "opioid receptors". The definition of "opioid" was later refined to refer to substances that have morphine-like activities that are mediated by the activation of opioid receptors. One modern pharmacology textbook states: "the term opioid applies to all agonists and antagonists with morphine-like activity, and also the naturally occurring and synthetic opioid peptides". Another pharmacology reference eliminates the morphine-like requirement: "Opioid, a more modern term, is used to designate all substances, both natural and synthetic, that bind to opioid receptors (including antagonists)". Some sources define the term opioid to exclude opiates, and others use opiate comprehensively instead of opioid, but opioid used inclusively is considered modern, preferred and is in wide use.

=== Efforts to reduce recreational use in the US ===
In 2011, the Obama administration released a white paper describing the administration's plan to deal with the opioid crisis. The administration's concerns about addiction and accidental overdosing have been echoed by numerous other medical and government advisory groups around the world.

As of 2015, prescription drug monitoring programs exist in every state except for Missouri. These programs allow pharmacists and prescribers to access patients' prescription histories in order to identify suspicious use. However, a survey of US physicians published in 2015 found that only 53% of doctors used these programs, while 22% were not aware that the programs were available to them. The Centers for Disease Control and Prevention (CDC) was tasked with establishing and publishing a new guideline, and was heavily lobbied. In 2016, the CDC published its Guideline for Prescribing Opioids for Chronic Pain, recommending that opioids only be used when benefits for pain and function are expected to outweigh risks, and then used at the lowest effective dosage, with avoidance of concurrent opioid and benzodiazepine use whenever possible. Research suggests that the prescription of high doses of opioids related to chronic opioid therapy (COT) can at times be prevented through state legislative guidelines and efforts by health plans that devote resources and establish shared expectations for reducing higher doses.

On 10 August 2017, Donald Trump declared the opioid crisis a (non-FEMA) national public health emergency.

=== Global shortages ===
Morphine and other poppy-based medicines have been identified by the World Health Organization as essential in the treatment of severe pain. As of 2002, seven countries (USA, UK, Italy, Australia, France, Spain and Japan) use 77% of the world's morphine supplies, leaving many emerging countries lacking in pain relief medication. The current system of supply of raw poppy materials to make poppy-based medicines is regulated by the International Narcotics Control Board under the provision of the 1961 Single Convention on Narcotic Drugs. The amount of raw poppy materials that each country can demand annually based on these provisions must correspond to an estimate of the country's needs taken from the national consumption within the preceding two years. In many countries, underprescription of morphine is rampant because of the high prices and the lack of training in the prescription of opiates. The World Health Organization is now working with administrations from various countries to train healthcare workers and to develop national regulations regarding drug prescription to facilitate a greater prescription of opiates.

Another idea to increase morphine availability is proposed by the ICOS, who suggest, through their proposal for Afghan Morphine, that Afghanistan could provide cheap pain relief solutions to emerging countries as part of a second-tier system of supply that would complement the current INCB regulated system by maintaining the balance and closed system that it establishes while providing finished-product morphine to people in severe pain who are unable to access opiates under the current system.

=== Recreational use ===
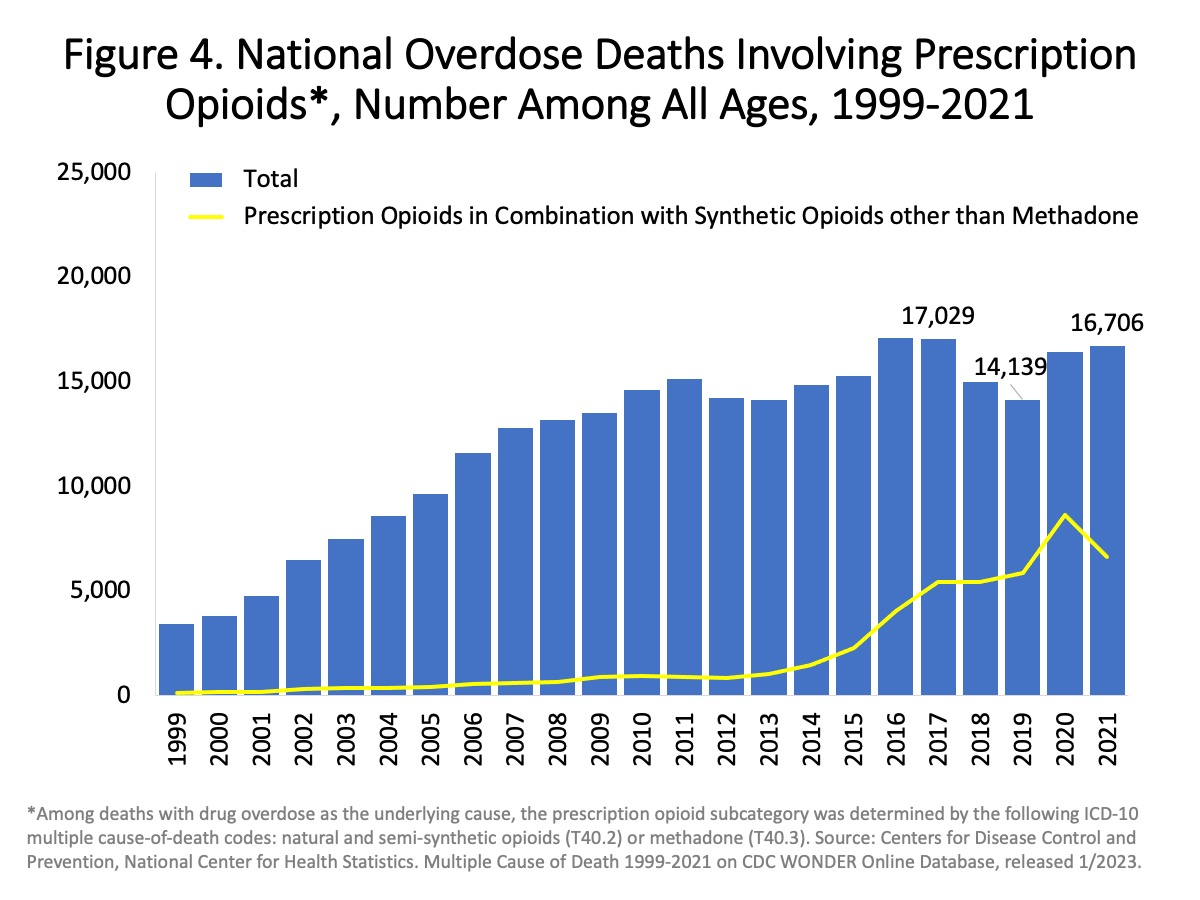
Prescription opioid pain reliever overdose deaths in the United States over years

Opioids can produce strong feelings of euphoria and are frequently used recreationally. Traditionally associated with illicit opioids such as heroin, prescription opioids are misused recreationally.

Drug misuse and non-medical use include the use of drugs for reasons or at doses other than prescribed. Opioid misuse can also include providing medications to persons for whom it was not prescribed. Such diversion may be treated as crimes, punishable by imprisonment in many countries. In 2014, almost 2 million Americans abused or were dependent on prescription opioids.

== Veterinary use ==
In the 17th century Robert Boyle investigated opium as a poison by giving opium to a dog. This experiment is the earliest documented use of an opioid in a domestic animal. In 1659, Christopher Wren and Boyle induced stupor in a dog via intravenous administration. Friedrich Wilhelm Adam Sertürner after isolating morphine from opium administered an aqueous alcoholic solution of morphine to four dogs and a mouse — one dog died and the others experienced sedation, convulsion, and emesis. Frederick Hobday was the first to report the varied effects of morphine in different species: in 1908 Hobday reported that morphine causes delirium in cats and horses but for dogs it induced anaesthesia. Hobday proposed that dogs be given 1/16th of a grain per pound to induce analgesia and anaesthesia in dogs. Despite the understanding of morphine's use in dogs it was not considered useful for other animals and in 1917, Howard Jay Milks wrote that morphine did not induce analgesia in animals other than dogs. Milks did report that 2 to 5 grains of morphine induced sedation in horses. Most research afterwards was more concerned with adverse effects of morphine as opposed to analgesic potential and opioids were not frequently used until the 1980s in veterinary practice, when an increased awareness of providing analgesia began to occur. Common routes for administration of opioids in veterinary medicine are intra-articular, intravenous, subcutaneous, intramuscular, intranasal, and transdermal. Common opioids in veterinary medicine are: morphine, fentanyl, and buprenorphine. Livestock are not usually given opioids due to a stand down period where an animal cannot be used for milking or slaughter following administration and strict regulations that require precise record keeping on administration of opioids.

== Classification ==
There are a number of broad classes of opioids:

- Natural opiates: alkaloids contained in the resin of the opium poppy, primarily morphine, codeine, and thebaine, but not papaverine and noscapine which have a different mechanism of action
- Esters of morphine opiates: slightly chemically altered but more natural than the semi-synthetics, as most are morphine prodrugs, diacetylmorphine (morphine diacetate; heroin), nicomorphine (morphine dinicotinate), dipropanoylmorphine (morphine dipropionate), acetylpropionylmorphine, dibenzoylmorphine, diacetyldihydromorphine;
- Semi-synthetic opioids: created from either the natural opiates or morphine esters, such as hydromorphone, hydrocodone, oxycodone, oxymorphone, ethylmorphine, buprenorphine and desomorphine;
- Fully synthetic opioids: such as fentanyl, pethidine, levorphanol, methadone, tramadol, tapentadol, and dextropropoxyphene;
- Endogenous opioid peptides, produced naturally in the body, such as endorphins, enkephalins, dynorphins, and endomorphins.
- Endogenous opioids, non-peptide: Morphine, and some other opioids, which are produced in small amounts in the body, are included in this category.
- Natural opioids, non-animal, non-opiate: the leaves from Mitragyna speciosa (kratom) contain a few naturally occurring opioids, active via Mu- and Delta receptors. Salvinorin A, found naturally in the Salvia divinorum plant, is a kappa-opioid receptor agonist.

Tramadol and tapentadol, which act as monoamine uptake inhibitors also act as mild and potent agonists (respectively) of the μ-opioid receptor. Both drugs produce analgesia even when naloxone, an opioid antagonist, is administered.

Some minor opium alkaloids and various substances with opioid action are also found elsewhere, including molecules present in kratom, Corydalis, and Salvia divinorum plants and some species of poppy aside from Papaver somniferum. There are also strains which produce copious amounts of thebaine, an important raw material for making many semi-synthetic and synthetic opioids. Of all of the more than 120 poppy species, only two produce morphine.

Amongst analgesics there are a small number of agents which act on the central nervous system but not on the opioid receptor system and therefore have none of the other (narcotic) qualities of opioids although they may produce euphoria by relieving pain—a euphoria that, because of the way it is produced, does not form the basis of habituation, physical dependence, or addiction. Foremost amongst these are nefopam, orphenadrine, and perhaps phenyltoloxamine or some other antihistamines. Tricyclic antidepressants have painkilling effect as well, but they're thought to do so by indirectly activating the endogenous opioid system. Paracetamol is predominantly a centrally acting analgesic (non-narcotic) which mediates its effect by action on descending serotonergic pathways, to increase 5-HT release (which inhibits release of pain mediators). It also decreases cyclo-oxygenase activity. It has recently been discovered that most or all of the therapeutic efficacy of paracetamol is due to a metabolite, AM404, which enhances the release of serotonin and inhibits the uptake of anandamide.

Other analgesics work peripherally (i.e., not on the brain or spinal cord). Research is starting to show that morphine and related drugs may indeed have peripheral effects as well, such as morphine gel working on burns. Recent investigations discovered opioid receptors on peripheral sensory neurons. A significant fraction (up to 60%) of opioid analgesia can be mediated by such peripheral opioid receptors, particularly in inflammatory conditions such as arthritis, traumatic or surgical pain. Inflammatory pain is also blunted by endogenous opioid peptides activating peripheral opioid receptors.

It was discovered in 1953, that humans and some animals naturally produce minute amounts of morphine, codeine, and possibly some of their simpler derivatives like heroin and dihydromorphine, in addition to endogenous opioid peptides. Some bacteria are capable of producing some semi-synthetic opioids such as hydromorphone and hydrocodone when living in a solution containing morphine or codeine respectively.

Many of the alkaloids and other derivatives of the opium poppy are not opioids or narcotics; the best example is the smooth-muscle relaxant papaverine. Noscapine is a marginal case as it does have CNS effects but not necessarily similar to morphine, and it is probably in a category all its own.

Dextromethorphan (the stereoisomer of levomethorphan, a semi-synthetic opioid agonist) and its metabolite dextrorphan have no opioid analgesic effect at all despite their structural similarity to other opioids; instead they are potent NMDA antagonists and sigma 1 and 2-receptor agonists and are used in many over-the-counter cough suppressants.

Salvinorin A is a selective, powerful ĸ-opioid receptor agonist. It is not considered an opioid nevertheless, because:

1. chemically, it is not an alkaloid; and
2. it has no typical opioid properties: absolutely no anxiolytic or cough-suppressant effects. It is instead a powerful hallucinogen.

Opioid peptides	Skeletal molecular images
Adrenorphin	Chemical structure of Adrenorphin
Amidorphin	Chemical structure of Amidorphin.
Casomorphin	Chemical structure of Bovine β-casomorphin.
DADLE	Chemical structure of DADLE.
DAMGO	Chemical structure of DAMGO.
Dermorphin	Chemical structure of Dermorphin.
Endomorphin	Chemical structure of Endomorphin 1.
Morphiceptin	Chemical structure of Morphiceptin.
Nociceptin	Chemical structure of Nociceptin.
Octreotide	Chemical structure of Octreotide.
Opiorphin	Chemical structure of Opiorphin.
TRIMU 5	Chemical structure of TRIMU 5.

=== Endogenous opioids ===
Opioid-peptides that are produced in the body include:

- Endorphins
- Enkephalins
- Dynorphins
- Endomorphins

β-endorphin is expressed in Pro-opiomelanocortin (POMC) cells in the arcuate nucleus, in the brainstem and in immune cells, and acts through μ-opioid receptors. β-endorphin has many effects, including on sexual behavior and appetite. β-endorphin is also secreted into the circulation from pituitary corticotropes and melanotropes. α-neoendorphin is also expressed in POMC cells in the arcuate nucleus.

Met-enkephalin is widely distributed in the CNS and in immune cells; [met]-enkephalin is a product of the proenkephalin gene, and acts through μ and δ-opioid receptors. leu-enkephalin, also a product of the proenkephalin gene, acts through δ-opioid receptors.

Dynorphin acts through κ-opioid receptors, and is widely distributed in the CNS, including in the spinal cord and hypothalamus, including in particular the arcuate nucleus and in both oxytocin and vasopressin neurons in the supraoptic nucleus.

Endomorphin acts through μ-opioid receptors, and is more potent than other endogenous opioids at these receptors.

=== Opium alkaloids and derivatives ===
==== Opium alkaloids ====
Phenanthrenes naturally occurring in (opium):

- Codeine
- Morphine
- Thebaine
- Oripavine

Preparations of mixed opium alkaloids, including papaveretum, are still occasionally used.

==== Esters of morphine ====
- Diacetylmorphine (morphine diacetate; heroin)
- Nicomorphine (morphine dinicotinate)
- Dipropanoylmorphine (morphine dipropionate)
- Diacetyldihydromorphine
- Acetylpropionylmorphine
- Desomorphine
- Methyldesorphine
- Dibenzoylmorphine

==== Ethers of morphine ====
- Dihydrocodeine
- Ethylmorphine
- Heterocodeine

==== Semi-synthetic alkaloid derivatives ====
- Buprenorphine
- Etorphine
- Hydrocodone
- Hydromorphone
- Oxycodone (sold as OxyContin)
- Oxymorphone

=== Synthetic opioids ===
==== Anilidopiperidines ====
- Fentanyl (see also list of fentanyl analogues)
- Alphamethylfentanyl
- Alfentanil
- Sufentanil
- Remifentanil
- Carfentanyl
- Ohmefentanyl
- Ohmecarfentanil

==== Benzimidazoles ====
- Metodesnitazene (Metazene)
- Etodesnitazene (Etazene)
- Etonitazepyne
- Etonitazepipne
- Nitazene opioids, which are a subgroup of benzimidazoles opioids
  - Metonitazene
  - Etonitazene
  - Isotonitazene
  - Clonitazene

==== Phenylpiperidines ====
- Pethidine (meperidine)
- Ketobemidone
- MPPP
- Allylprodine
- Prodine
- PEPAP
- Promedol

==== Diphenylpropylamine derivatives ====
- Propoxyphene
- Dextropropoxyphene
- Dextromoramide
- Bezitramide
- Piritramide
- Methadone
- Dipipanone
- Levomethadyl acetate (LAAM)
- Difenoxin
- Diphenoxylate
- Loperamide (does cross the blood–brain barrier but is quickly pumped into the non-central nervous system by P-Glycoprotein. Mild opiate withdrawal in animal models exhibits this action after sustained and prolonged use including rhesus monkeys, mice, and rats.)

==== Benzomorphan derivatives ====
- Dezocine—agonist/antagonist
- Pentazocine—agonist/antagonist
- Phenazocine

==== Oripavine derivatives ====
- Buprenorphine—partial agonist
- Dihydroetorphine
- Etorphine

==== Morphinan derivatives ====
- Butorphanol—agonist/antagonist
- Nalbuphine—agonist/antagonist
- Levorphanol
- Levomethorphan
- Racemethorphan

==== Others ====
- Lefetamine
- Meptazinol
- Mitragynine
- Tilidine
- Tramadol
- Tapentadol
- Eluxadoline
- Bucinnazine
- 7-Hydroxymitragynine

=== Allosteric modulators ===
Plain allosteric modulators do not belong to the opioids, instead they are classified as opioidergics.

=== Opioid antagonists ===
- Nalmefene
- Naloxone
- Naltrexone
- Methylnaltrexone (Methylnaltrexone is only peripherally active as it does not cross the blood–brain barrier in sufficient quantities to be centrally active. As such, it can be considered the antithesis of loperamide.)
- Naloxegol (Naloxegol is only peripherally active as it does not cross the blood–brain barrier in sufficient quantities to be centrally active. As such, it can be considered the antitheses of loperamide.)

=== Tables of opioids ===
==== Table of morphinan opioids ====
Table of morphinan opioids: click to

Morphine	2,4-Dinitrophenylmorphine	6-MDDM	Chlornaltrexamine	Desomorphine
Dihydromorphine	Hydromorphinol	Methyldesorphine	N-Phenethylnormorphine	RAM-378
3,6-diesters of morphine
Acetylpropionylmorphine	Dihydroheroin	Dibenzoylmorphine	Dipropanoylmorphine	Heroin
Nicomorphine
Codeine-dionine family
Codeine	6-MAC	Benzylmorphine	Codeine methylbromide	Dihydroheterocodeine
Ethylmorphine	Heterocodeine	Pholcodine	Myrophine	Methyldihydromorphine
Morphinones and morphols
14-Cinnamoyloxycodeinone	14-Ethoxymetopon	14-Methoxymetopon	PPOM	7-Spiroindanyloxymorphone
Acetylmorphone	Codeinone	Conorphone	Codoxime	Thebacon
Hydrocodone	Hydromorphone	Metopon	Morphinone	N-Phenethyl-14-Ethoxymetopon
Oxycodone	Oxymorphone	Pentamorphone	Semorphone	
Various semi-synthetics
Chloromorphide	14-Hydroxydihydrocodeine	Acetyldihydrocodeine	Dihydrocodeine	Nalbuphine
Nicocodeine	Nicodicodeine	Oxymorphazone	1-Iodomorphine	
Active opiate metabolites
M6G	6-MAM	Norcodeine	Normorphine	Morphine-N-oxide
Synthetic morphinans
Cyclorphan	DXA	Levorphanol	Levophenacylmorphan	Levomethorphan
Norlevorphanol	Oxilorphan	Phenomorphan	Furethylnorlevorphanol	Xorphanol
Butorphanol	Cyprodime	Drotebanol		
Orvinols & Oripavine derivatives
6,14-Endoethenotetrahydrooripavine	7-PET	Acetorphine	BU-48	Buprenorphine
Cyprenorphine	Dihydroetorphine	Etorphine	Norbuprenorphine	Thienorphine
Opioid antagonists & inverse agonists
5'-Guanidinonaltrindole	Diprenorphine	Levallorphan	MNTX	Nalfurafine
Nalmefene	Naloxazone	Naloxone	Nalorphine	Naltrexone
Naltriben	Naltrindole	6β-Naltrexol-d4	3-Iodobenzoyl Naltrexamine	
Morphinan dimers
Pseudomorphine	Naloxonazine	Norbinaltorphimine	Somniferine	

==== Table of non-morphinan opioids ====
Table of non-morphinan opioids: click to

Benzomorphans
8-CAC	Alazocine	Bremazocine	Dezocine	Ketazocine
Metazocine	Pentazocine	Phenazocine	Cyclazocine	
4-Phenylpiperidines
4-Fluoromeperidine	Allylnorpethidine	Anileridine	Benzethidine	Carperidine
Difenoxin	Diphenoxylate	Etoxeridine	Furethidine	Hydroxypethidine
Morpheridine	Oxpheneridine	Pethidine	Pheneridine	Phenoperidine
Piminodine	Properidine	Sameridine	Allylprodine	α-Meprodine
MPPP	PEPAP	α-Prodine	Prosidol	Trimeperidine
Acetoxyketobemidone	Droxypropine	Ketobemidone	Methylketobemidone	Propylketobemidone
Alvimopan	Loperamide	Picenadol		
Open chain opioids
Dipipanone	Methadone	Normethadone	Phenadoxone	Dimepheptanol
Levacetylmethadol	Dextromoramide	Levomoramide	Racemoramide	Diethylthiambutene
Dimethylthiambutene	Ethylmethylthiambutene	Piperidylthiambutene	Pyrrolidinylthiambutene	Thiambutene
Tipepidine	Dextropropoxyphene	Dimenoxadol	Dioxaphetyl butyrate	Levopropoxyphene
Norpropoxyphene	Diampromide	Phenampromide	Propiram	Methiodone
Isoaminile	Lefetamine	R-4066		
Anilidopiperidines
3-Allylfentanyl	3-Methylfentanyl	3-Methylthiofentanyl	4-Phenylfentanyl	Alfentanil
α-Methylacetylfentanyl	α-Methylfentanyl	α-Methylthiofentanyl	β-Hydroxyfentanyl	β-Hydroxythiofentanyl
β-Methylfentanyl	Brifentanil	Carfentanil	Fentanyl	Lofentanil
Mirfentanil	Ocfentanil	Ohmefentanyl	Parafluorofentanyl	Phenaridine
Remifentanil	Sufentanil	Thiofentanyl	Trefentanil	
Various others
Ethoheptazine	Metheptazine	Metethoheptazine	Proheptazine	Bezitramide
Piritramide	Clonitazene	Etonitazene	18-MC	7-Hydroxymitragynine
Akuammine	Eseroline	Hodgkinsine	Mitragynine	Pericine
BW373U86	DPI-221	DPI-287	DPI-3290	SNC-80
AD-1211	AH-7921	Azaprocin	Bromadol	BRL-52537
Bromadoline	C-8813	Ciramadol	Doxpicomine	Enadoline
Faxeladol	GR-89696	Herkinorin	ICI-199441	ICI-204448
J-113397	JTC-801	LPK-26	Methopholine	MT-45
NDMC	NNC 63-0532	Nortilidine	O-Desmethyltramadol	Prodilidine
Profadol	Ro64-6198	SB-612111	SC-17599	RWJ-394674
TAN-67	Tapentadol	Tifluadom	Tramadol	Trimebutine
U-50488	U-69593	Viminol	W-18	Alvimopan
JDTic	MCOPPB	Beta-amine ketone 'compound 29'		

== See also ==
- Froehde reagent
- Opiate comparison
- Opioid epidemic
- Opioid tapering
