= Dipropanoylmorphine =

Opioid analgesic drug

Clinical data
- Other names: Morphine dipropionate, Dipropanoylmorphine, 3,6-dipropanoylmorphine, Dipropionylmorphine
- ATC code: none

Legal status
- Legal status: US: Schedule I

Identifiers
- IUPAC name: (5α,6α)-7,8-Didehydro-4,5-epoxy-17-methylmorphinan 3,6-dipropionate
- CAS Number: 10589-79-4; hydrochloride: 62268-07-9
- PubChem CID: 165894
- ChemSpider: 145387
- UNII: RT28EEO2YA; hydrochloride: TTM24Y869Z
- CompTox Dashboard (EPA): DTXSID40909801
- ECHA InfoCard: 100.031.073

Chemical and physical data
- Formula: C_{23}H_{27}NO_{5}
- Molar mass: 397.471 g·mol^{−1}
- 3D model (JSmol): Interactive image
- SMILES: CCC(=O)c3c1C[C@H]4N(C)CC[C@@]25[C@@H](Oc(c12)c(O)c3C(=O)CC)[C@@H](O)\C=C/[C@@H]45
- InChI: InChI=1S/C23H27NO5/c1-4-14(25)17-11-10-13-12-6-7-16(27)22-23(12,8-9-24(13)3)19(11)21(29-22)20(28)18(17)15(26)5-2/h6-7,12-13,16,22,27-28H,4-5,8-10H2,1-3H3/t12-,13+,16-,22-,23-/m0/s1; Key:KDFWILUISXRMIK-LISRSHBKSA-N

Dipropanoylmorphine (dipropionylmorphine in US English) is an opiate derivative, the 3,6-dipropanoyl ester of morphine. It was developed in 1972 as an analgesic. It is rarely used in some countries for the relief of severe pain such as that caused by terminal cancer, as an alternative to diamorphine (heroin) and morphine. The drug was first synthesised circa or about 1875 in Great Britain along with many other esters of morphine, all of which were shelved at the time, some of which were later developed such as heroin (1898), acetylpropionylmorphine (1924), dibenzoylmorphine (1900 and/or 1924), and so on. The name of this drug is also given as 3,6-dipropanoylmorphine and its 6-mono-acetylated homologue is also a longer-acting heroin-like drug, as are 3,6-diformylmorphine and 6-formylmorphine.

Dipropanoylmorphine, though rarely used, is considered to be a safer and less addictive alternative to morphine. Studies and clinical trials comparing dipropanoylmorphine to morphine have produced results that indicate the incidence of side-effects are far more common with morphine. Respiratory depression, euphoria, excessive sedation and somnolence (so-called 'nodding' by recreational opioid users), constipation, miosis (pinpoint pupils), nausea, bradycardia, behavioral disturbances, and severe physical and psychological dependence on morphine is more likely with the use of morphine versus dipropanoylmorphine.

Dipropanoylmorphine is slightly slower acting than diamorphine and morphine, but longer lasting, and is slightly more potent by weight due to its higher lipophilicity. Side effects are generally relatively mild for an opioid with a similar profile to morphine/heroin and typical of other opioids. The most common side effects associated with dipropanoylmorphine are itching, nausea and respiratory depression.

Dipropanoylmorphine is prepared by reacting morphine with propionic anhydride, in an analogous manner to how heroin is produced by reacting morphine with acetic anhydride.

While acetic anhydride is a restricted chemical around the world due to its potential uses in making heroin from morphine for the illicit market, it is used in vast amounts by the chemical industry for the manufacture of drugs such as aspirin. Propanoic anhydride however is much less widely used. Although it is used in the manufacture of a range of pharmaceuticals, none of these are produced in nearly as large quantities, and sales of propanoic anhydride in quantities larger than one gram must be reported in many countries because of its potential use in making fentanyl type synthetic opiates.
