= Benzylmorphine =

Opioid analgesic and cough suppressant drug

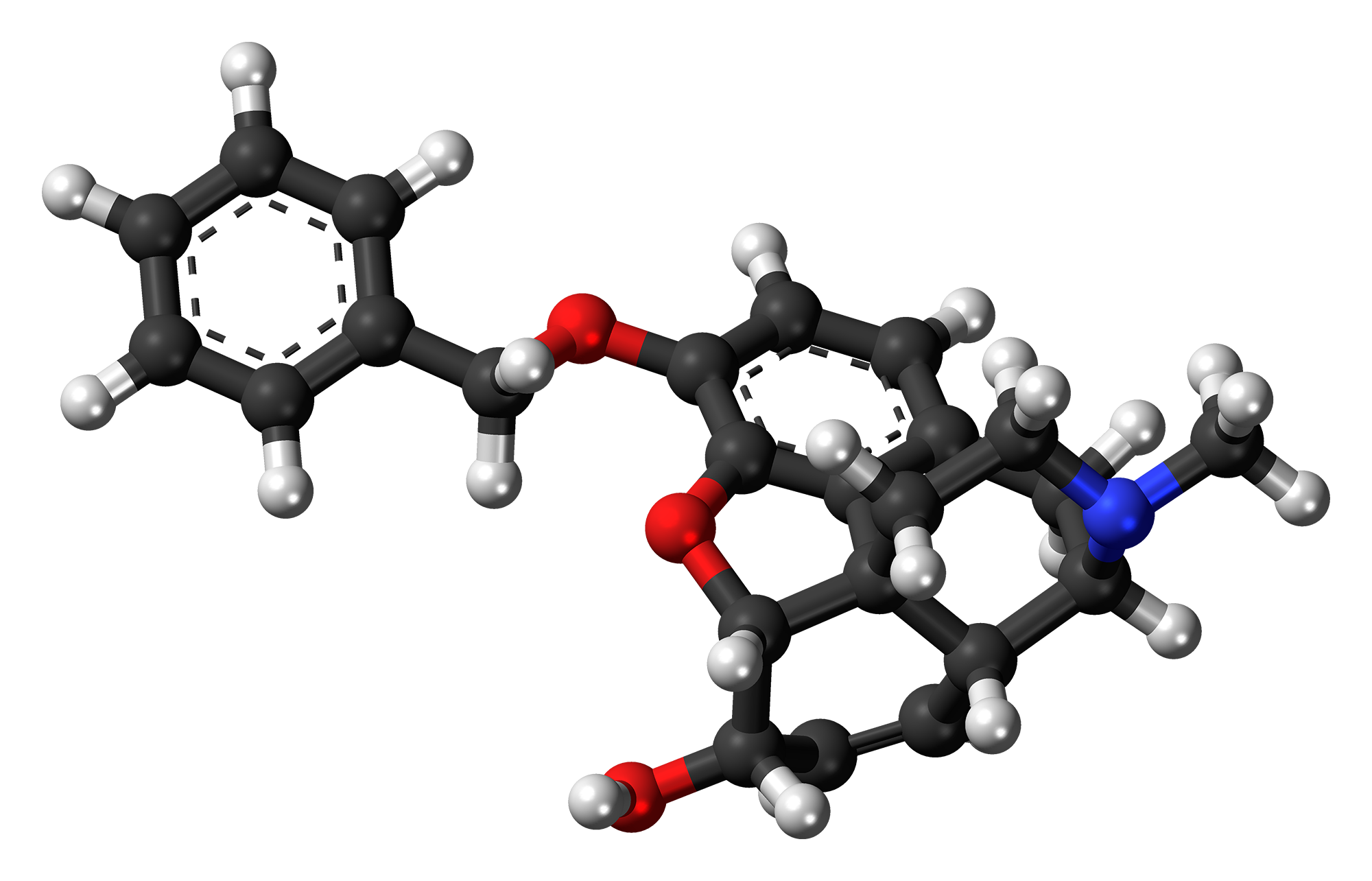

Clinical data
- Other names: Benzylmorphine, Peronine, 3-Benzyloxy- 4,5α-epoxy- 17-methyl- 7-morphinen-6α-ol
- ATC code: none

Legal status
- Legal status: BR: Class A1 (Narcotic drugs); CA: Schedule I; DE: Anlage I (Authorized scientific use only); US: Schedule I; UN: Narcotic Schedule I

Identifiers
- IUPAC name: (5α,6α)-3-(benzyloxy)-17-methyl-7,8-didehydro-4,5-epoxymorphinan-6-ol
- CAS Number: 14297-87-1
- PubChem CID: 5362507
- DrugBank: DB01573
- ChemSpider: 4515062
- UNII: 83C78V3OL9
- CompTox Dashboard (EPA): DTXSID30162246
- ECHA InfoCard: 100.034.739

Chemical and physical data
- Formula: C_{24}H_{25}NO_{3}
- Molar mass: 375.468 g·mol^{−1}
- 3D model (JSmol): Interactive image
- SMILES: O[C@H]2\C=C/[C@H]6[C@@H]5N(CC[C@@]61c4c(O[C@H]12)c(OCc3ccccc3)ccc4C5)C
- InChI: InChI=1S/C24H25NO3/c1-25-12-11-24-17-8-9-19(26)23(24)28-22-20(27-14-15-5-3-2-4-6-15)10-7-16(21(22)24)13-18(17)25/h2-10,17-19,23,26H,11-14H2,1H3/t17-,18+,19-,23-,24-/m0/s1; Key:RDJGWRFTDZZXSM-RNWLQCGYSA-N

Benzylmorphine (Peronine) is a semi-synthetic opioid narcotic introduced to the international market in 1896 and that of the United States very shortly thereafter. It is much like codeine, containing a benzyl group attached to the morphine molecule just as the methyl group creates codeine and the ethyl group creates ethylmorphine or dionine (used as a generic name for that drug just as peronine is for benzylmorphine). It is about 90% as strong as codeine by weight.

This drug, the benzyl ether of morphine, should not be confused with dibenzoylmorphine, an ester of morphine comparable to heroin. Another morphine ether developed around the same time, benzyldihydromorphine, saw some clinical use in the opening years of the 20th century. The ethers of morphine and codeine as well as dihydromorphine and dihydrocodeine number close to 100 and include such obscure opioids as formylallopseudoisocodeine.

Benzylmorphine is used in much the same way as codeine and ethylmorphine, primarily as a moderate strength analgesic, for eye surgery as a 1 to 2% solution, and as a cough suppressant. It was available in the United States prior to 1914 and was still used until the 1960s, but fell into disuse once alternative opiate derivatives became preferred by doctors (i.e. hydrocodone as an analgesic and codeine as a cough suppressant) Benzylmorphine is now a Schedule I Controlled Substance in the US and is regulated internationally under UN drug conventions.

Benzylmorphine is an active metabolite of the opioid analgesic myrophine, formed in the liver. It has a metabolic fate similar to that of codeine.

Benzylmorphine is used as the hydrochloride (free base conversion ratio 0.91) and methylsulphonate (0.80) and has a US DEA Administrative Controlled Substance Control Number of 9052.
