= Alfentanil =

Synthetic opioid analgesic

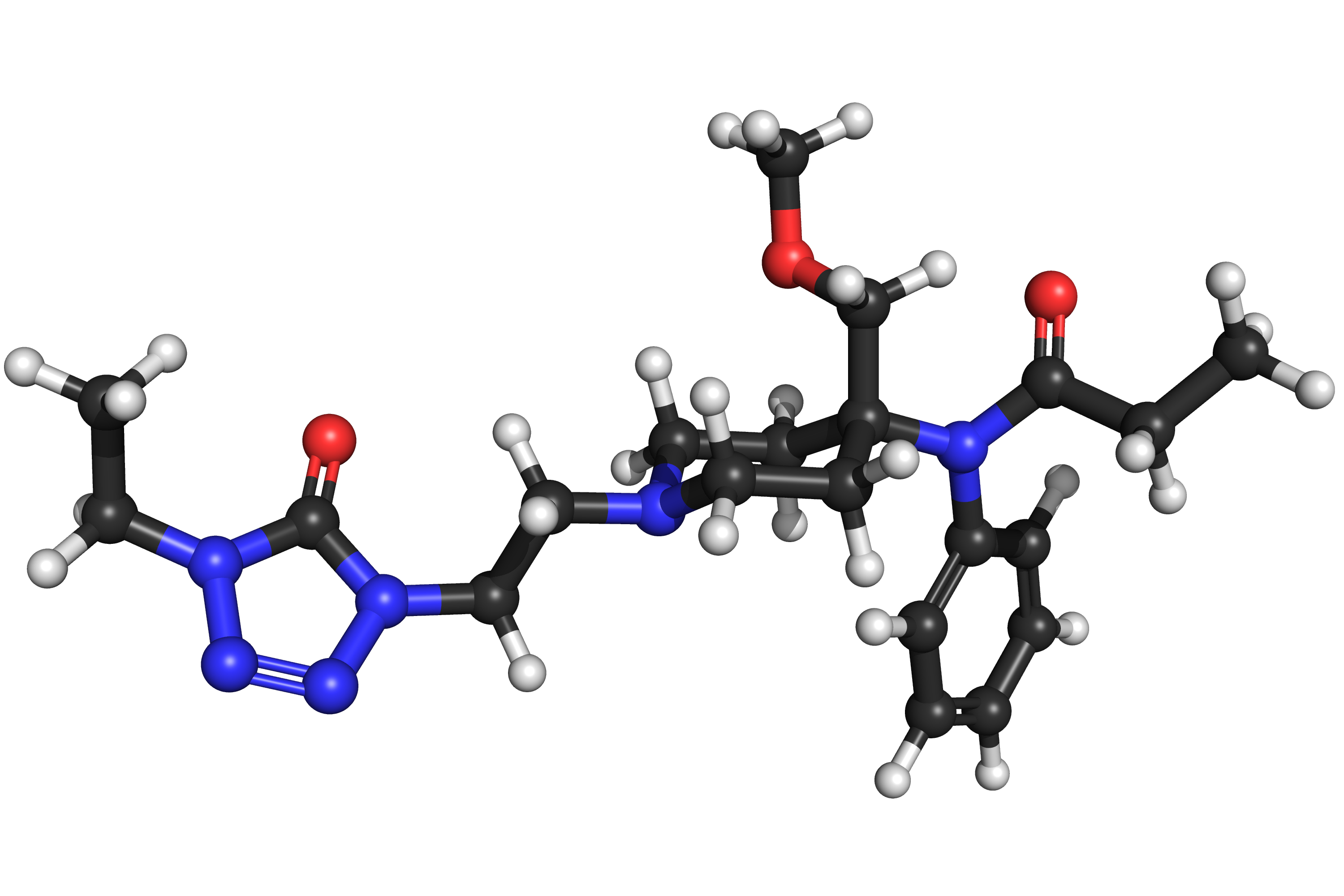
- Above: Alfentanil structure Below: 3D model of alfentanil molecule

Clinical data
- Trade names: Alfenta, Rapifen, others
- Other names: R-39209
- AHFS/Drugs.com: Micromedex Detailed Consumer Information
- MedlinePlus: a601130
- Routes of administration: Intravenous, subcutaneous
- Drug class: Opioid
- ATC code: N01AH02 (WHO)

Legal status
- Legal status: AU: S8 (Controlled drug); BR: Class A1 (Narcotic drugs); CA: Schedule I; DE: Anlage III (Special prescription form required); UK: Class A; US: Schedule II

Pharmacokinetic data
- Bioavailability: IV/IM/SC: 100%
- Protein binding: 92%
- Metabolism: Hepatic
- Elimination half-life: 90–111 minutes
- Duration of action: 15 minutes

Identifiers
- IUPAC name: N-{1-[2-(4-ethyl-5-oxo-4,5-dihydro-1H-1,2,3,4-tetrazol-1-yl)ethyl]-4-(methoxymethyl)piperidin-4-yl}-N-phenylpropanamide
- CAS Number: 71195-58-9
- PubChem CID: 51263
- IUPHAR/BPS: 7108
- DrugBank: DB00802
- ChemSpider: 46451
- UNII: 1N74HM2BS7
- KEGG: D07122
- ChEBI: CHEBI:2569
- ChEMBL: ChEMBL634
- CompTox Dashboard (EPA): DTXSID9022570
- ECHA InfoCard: 100.295.336

Chemical and physical data
- Formula: C_{21}H_{32}N_{6}O_{3}
- Molar mass: 416.526 g·mol^{−1}
- 3D model (JSmol): Interactive image
- Melting point: 140.8 °C (285.4 °F)
- SMILES: O=C1N(\N=N/N1CC)CCN3CCC(N(c2ccccc2)C(=O)CC)(CC3)COC
- InChI: InChI=1S/C21H32N6O3/c1-4-19(28)27(18-9-7-6-8-10-18)21(17-30-3)11-13-24(14-12-21)15-16-26-20(29)25(5-2)22-23-26/h6-10H,4-5,11-17H2,1-3H3; Key:IDBPHNDTYPBSNI-UHFFFAOYSA-N

Alfentanil, sold under the brand name Alfenta among others, is a potent, short-acting synthetic opioid analgesic drug used for anesthesia in surgery. It is an analogue of fentanyl with around one-fourth to one-tenth the potency, one-third the duration of action, and an onset of action four times faster than that of fentanyl. Alfentanil has a pKa of approximately 6.5, which leads to a very high proportion of the drug being uncharged at physiologic pH, a characteristic responsible for its rapid-onset. It is an agonist of the μ-opioid receptor.

While alfentanil tends to cause fewer cardiovascular complications than other similar drugs such as fentanyl and remifentanil, it tends to give stronger respiratory depression and so requires careful monitoring of breathing and vital signs. Almost exclusively used by anesthesia providers during portions of a case where quick, fast-acting (though not long-lasting) pain control is needed (as, for example, during nerve blocks), alfentanil is administered by the parenteral (injected) route for fast-onset and precise control of dosage.

Discovered at Janssen Pharmaceutica in 1976, alfentanil is classified as a Schedule II drug in the United States.

== History ==
The first application of the bolus, elimination, transfer infusion scheme used alfentanil and etomidate in 1983.

== Pharmacology ==
Alfentanil has moderate binding affinity for the μ-opioid receptor in humans at 7.391 nM (Morphine 1.168).
