= Ethylketazocine =

Chemical compound

Clinical data
- Other names: ethylketocyclazocine
- ATC code: None

Identifiers
- IUPAC name: (1S,9R)-10-(cyclopropylmethyl)-1-ethyl-4-hydroxy-13-methyl-10-azatricyclo[7.3.1.0^{2,7}]trideca-2,4,6-trien-8-one
- CAS Number: 36292-66-7
- PubChem CID: 644273
- IUPHAR/BPS: 1602
- ChemSpider: 559289
- ChEMBL: ChEMBLCHEMBL279968
- CompTox Dashboard (EPA): DTXSID40957665

Chemical and physical data
- Formula: C_{19}H_{25}NO_{2}
- Molar mass: 299.414 g·mol^{−1}
- 3D model (JSmol): Interactive image
- SMILES: O=C2c1c(cc(O)cc1)[C@@]3(C([C@H]2N(CC3)CC4CC4)C)CC
- InChI: InChI=1S/C19H25NO2/c1-3-19-8-9-20(11-13-4-5-13)17(12(19)2)18(22)15-7-6-14(21)10-16(15)19/h6-7,10,12-13,17,21H,3-5,8-9,11H2,1-2H3/t12?,17-,19+/m1/s1; Key:SEJUQQOPVAUETF-MKFRLIFGSA-N

Ethylketazocine (WIN-35,197-2), is an opioid drug of the benzomorphan family which has been used extensively in scientific research in the last few decades as a tool to aid in the study of the κ-opioid receptor. However, due to its relatively poor selectivity for the κ-opioid receptor over the μ- and δ-opioid receptors (of which it has approximately 80% and 20% of the affinity for, respectively, in comparison), as well as its relatively poor intrinsic activity at all sites (i.e., acts as a partial agonist with mixed agonist and antagonist properties), it has been mostly replaced in recent times by newer and more potent and selective compounds like U-50,488 and ICI-199,441.

== See also ==
- Benzomorphan
- Ketazocine
