= Opioid-induced endocrinopathy =

Complication of chronic opioid treatment

Opioid-induced endocrinopathy (OIE) is a complication of chronic opioid treatment. It is a common name for all hypothalamo-pituitary axis disorders, which can be observed mostly after long term use of opioids, both as a treatment and as a substance of abuse.

The effect of opioids on hormonal levels can be measured immediately after the application of the opioid. The onset of deficit mostly comes after longer time of use of high doses, but sometimes coexisting factor like cancer disease, pain disease or other medicines may accelerate the progress.

== Pathophysiology ==
Opioid-induced hypogonadism, caused by negative effect of opioids on hypothalamo-pituitary gonadal axis is most often ( 21-86% of opioid users). Hypogonadism is induced through direct inhibitory action of opioids on receptors within the hypothalamic–pituitary–gonadal (HPG) and hypothalamic–pituitary–adrenal (HPA) axes as well as testosterone production within the testes. Opioid-induced hypogonadism and direct negative effect of opioids to bone formatting leads to osteoporosis.

The opioid effect on adrenal hormone production, somatostatin and thyroid levels is less common, but should be considered as well due to the serious impact on the patients' total health.

Effect on hypothalamic–pituitary–adrenal axis is well described both after short acting and long-acting treatment with opioids, resulting in cortisol deficit. It might lead to the problems in stress situations, immunodeficiency and Addison crisis.

Opioid-induced hyperprolactemia can lead to the painful growth of breast (gynecomastia), milk production (galactorhea) and hypogonadism.

Opioid-induced defect of hypothalamic–pituitary–somatotropic axis leads to growth hormone deficiency which in adults results in cognitive dysfunction, mainly affecting visuospatial memory and orientation.

== Symptoms ==
Testosterone deficit at men leads to erectile problems, infertility, depression, anxiety, night sweat and hot flushes. Premenopausal women due to the low estrogen levels struggle of irregular menstruation, infertility or complete menopause. Postmenopausal women might have lower levels of dehydroxyepiandosterone, LH and FSH as well leading to fatigue and depressions. Fatigue, higher incidence of infection diseases, problems with wound healing and total exhaustion during infects or Addison crisis are symptoms of cortisol deficit. Pathological fractures in early age at opioid users must indicate bone density evaluation and osteoporosis suspicion. Disorientation in the previously well-known surrounding can be the symptom of GH deficit.

== Treatment ==
If cessation or decreasing of doses of opioids is possible, endocrinopathy can be reversed. If the treatment with opioid cannot be disrupted due to the serious reasons, for example in substitution program or due to the severe pain or cancer, the hormonal substitution should be considered. It seems like opioids with partial antagonistic action, like buprenorphine, affect hormonal levels less.
