= Opioid tapering =

Reduction of opioid doses over time

Opioid tapering is the reduction of opioid doses over time. Opioid tapering is typically done in people taking opioids for chronic pain. Tapering may be conducted in medically-supervised inpatient or outpatient settings.

Community-based opioid tapering increased after the 2016 "Center for Disease Control Guideline for Prescribing Opioids in Chronic Pain" was published, and many prescribers and organizations instigated opioid tapering practices in order to reduce opioid prescribing. While the CDC guideline was intended to inform primary care physicians on new prescription initiation, in many cases it was misapplied beyond this narrow scope and used to inform opioid tapering practices among patients taking long-term prescription opioids for chronic pain.

Voluntary patient-centered opioid tapering has shown success with engagement and reduction of moderate and high-dose opioid doses over the course of months. Principles of patient-centered opioid tapering include: patient consent to taper, patient ability to control the pace of the taper, and pause the taper if desired. Recent published national study protocols ascribe to these principles.

Some healthcare providers have expressed concern about negative consequences of rapid forced tapering including suicidality. Human Rights Watch has called the negative consequences of forced prescription opioid tapering in chronic pain to be a "human rights issue".

In April 2019, the Federal Drug Administration issued a drug safety communication warning against sudden discontinuation of opioid pain medicines and requires label changes to guide prescribers on gradual, individualized tapering. In October 2019, U.S. Health and Human Services published the HHS Guide for Clinicians on the Appropriate Dosage Reduction or Discontinuation of Long-Term Opioid Analgesics. The document calls for a patient-centered approach, cautions against a blanket assumption that less opioids is always best, and provides an implementation guide for opioid tapering for patients for whom reduction is best.

== Benefits ==
Some studies show pain improves with tapering of long terms opioids, though these are generally data from studies conducted in inpatient settings or in intensive and interdisciplinary programs that are largely inaccessible to the vast majority of patients taking opioids. One community-based opioid tapering study reported that on average pain remained constant among a group of patients tapering long-term opioids, but the study was voluntary and those not wishing to taper either did not enroll or dropped out of the study. The authors cautioned against generalizing their findings to patients who do not wish to taper opioids. Authors of a VA review on "Benefits and Harms of Long-term Opioid Dose Reduction or Discontinuation in Patients with Chronic Pain" recently concluded that: "... evidence is inadequate to fully weigh the balance of the benefits and harms of long-term opioid therapy against the benefits and harms of tapering, primarily due to limited information on tapering harms."

== Iatrogenic harms ==
Some healthcare providers have expressed grave concern about iatrogenic consequences from rapid forced tapering, and poor tapering practices, including suicidality and patient suicides. Data suggest that opioid dose variability—either increases or decreases in dose—confers risk for opioid overdose. Retrospective evidence suggests that rapid tapers are associated with increased emergency department visits and hospitalizations. Cautions have been raised for conducting opioid tapering in patients with mental health conditions such as major depression and post-traumatic stress disorder as opioid tapering may destabilize these vulnerable patients and expose them to new health risks. Tapering in veterans has been associated with increased risk for overdose and suicide. Authors of this report cautioned that tapering should be conducted in select patients and with careful monitoring that ends at least 3 months after the taper. In 2021, researchers published a report in JAMA that citing iatrogenic harms of opioid tapering -- including overdose and mental health crises -- among patients receiving high dose prescription opioids. One criticism of current tapering research is that attrition from studies is not characterized, thereby potentially undercounting patients who have lost their medical care or suicided during tapering.
