= Naltriben =

Chemical compound

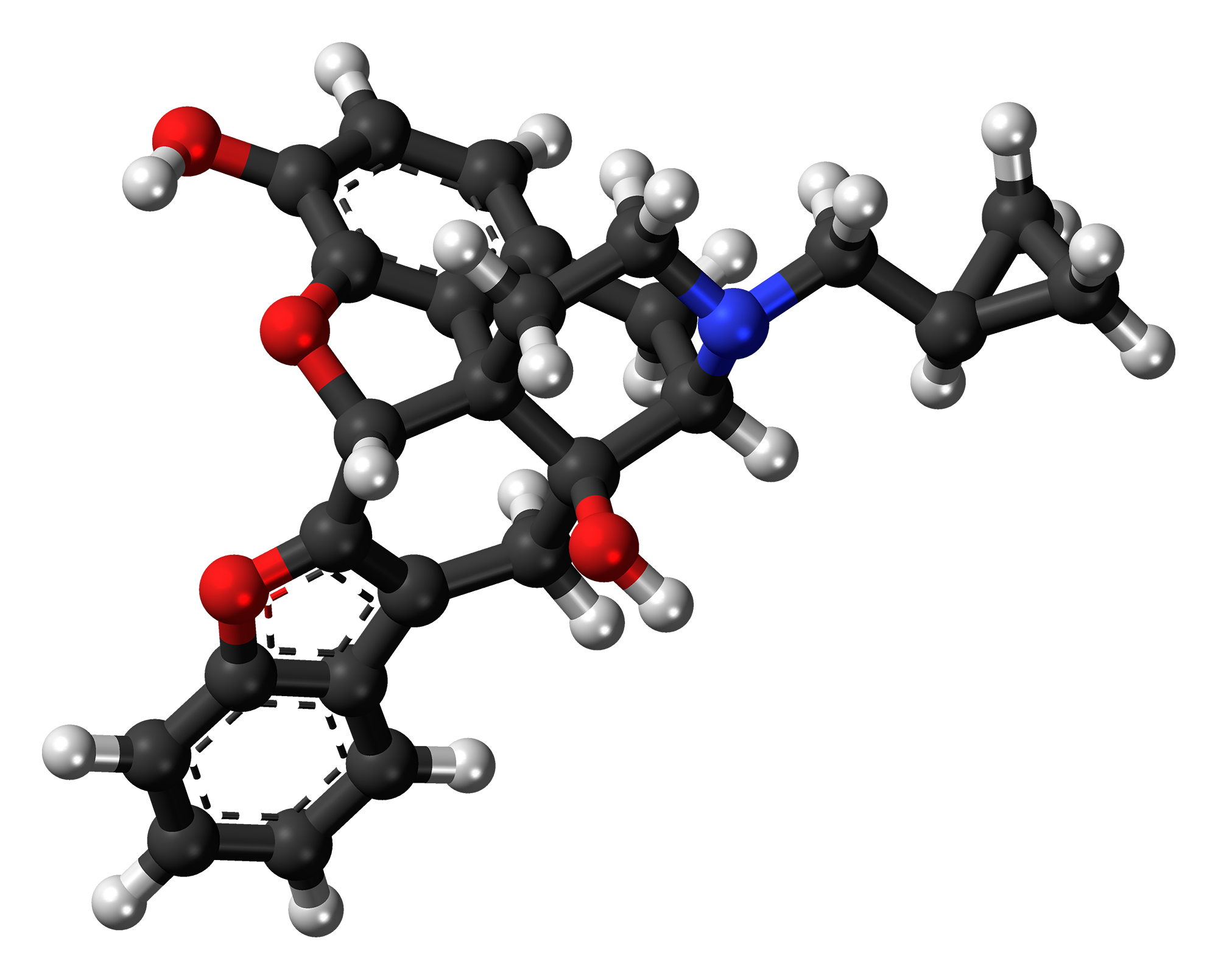

Clinical data
- ATC code: none

Identifiers
- CAS Number: 111555-58-9
- PubChem CID: 5486827
- IUPHAR/BPS: 1640
- ChemSpider: 4589081
- UNII: RXG719F189
- ChEMBL: ChEMBL100940
- PDB ligand: ZY8 (PDBe, RCSB PDB)
- CompTox Dashboard (EPA): DTXSID80912218

Chemical and physical data
- Formula: C_{26}H_{25}NO_{4}
- Molar mass: 415.489 g·mol^{−1}
- 3D model (JSmol): Interactive image
- SMILES: Oc3c2O[C@H]6c1oc8ccccc8c1C[C@@]5(O)[C@H]4N(CC[C@@]56c2c(cc3)C4)CC7CC7
- InChI: InChI=1S/C26H25NO4/c28-18-8-7-15-11-20-26(29)12-17-16-3-1-2-4-19(16)30-22(17)24-25(26,21(15)23(18)31-24)9-10-27(20)13-14-5-6-14/h1-4,7-8,14,20,24,28-29H,5-6,9-13H2/t20-,24+,25+,26-/m1/s1; Key:ZHVWWEYETMPAMX-IFKAHUTRSA-N

Naltriben is a potent and selective antagonist for the delta opioid receptor, which is used in scientific research. It has similar effects to the more widely used δ antagonist naltrindole, but with different binding affinity for the δ_{1} and δ_{2} subtypes, which makes it useful for distinguishing the subtype selectivity of drugs acting at the δ receptors. It also acts as a κ-opioid agonist at high doses.

== See also ==
- Nalfurafine
- Nalmefene
- Naltrindole
