= Acetylpropionylmorphine =

Chemical compound

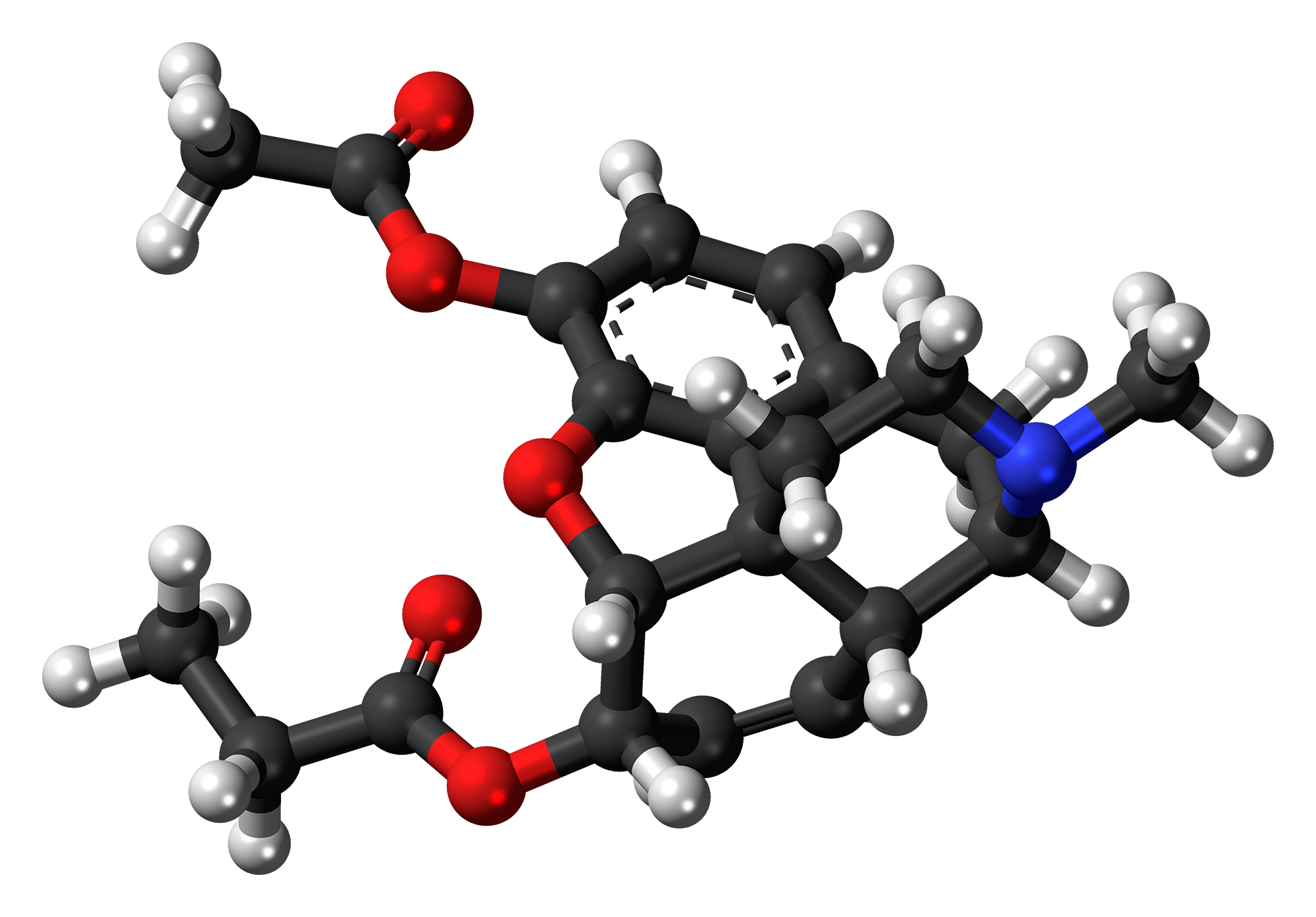

Clinical data
- Other names: 3-Acetyl-6-propionylmorphine
- ATC code: none

Legal status
- Legal status: UN: Illegal under UN drug conventions as "ester of morphine"

Identifiers
- IUPAC name: 3-acetyl-6-propionyl-(5α,6α)-7,8-didehydro-4,5-epoxy-17-methylmorphinan
- CAS Number: 66640-99-1
- ChemSpider: 26286893
- CompTox Dashboard (EPA): DTXSID60745425

Chemical and physical data
- Formula: C_{22}H_{25}NO_{5}
- Molar mass: 383.444 g·mol^{−1}
- 3D model (JSmol): Interactive image
- SMILES: CN4CCC23c1c(cc5)CC4C2C=CC(OC(=O)CC)C3Oc1c5OC(=O)C
- InChI: InChI=1S/C22H25NO5/c1-4-18(25)27-17-8-6-14-15-11-13-5-7-16(26-12(2)24)20-19(13)22(14,21(17)28-20)9-10-23(15)3/h5-8,14-15,17,21H,4,9-11H2,1-3H3/t14-,15+,17-,21-,22-/m0/s1; Key:JDTRGWXTYWXUHP-CLTUZACYSA-N

Acetylpropionylmorphine is an opioid analog that is an ester of morphine. It was developed in the early 1900s after first being synthesized in United Kingdom in 1875 but shelved along with heroin and various other esters of morphine. Acetylpropionylmorphone was never used medically, instead being widely sold as one of the first "designer drugs" for around five years following the introduction of the first international restrictions on the sale of heroin in 1925. It is described as being virtually identical to heroin and morphine in its effects, and consequently was itself banned internationally in 1930 by the Health Committee of the League of Nations, in order to prevent its sale as an unscheduled alternative to heroin.

== Morphine ester chemistry ==
Another name for this drug is 3-acetyl-6-propionylmorphine, and it is produced by the acetylation of 6-propionylmorphine, an active opioid which is an ester of morphine first produced along with heroin and numerous other mono-, di-, and tetra- esters of morphine in the United Kingdom in 1872–1876 and then shelved; 6-propionylmorphine was later researched by firms and organizations in Italy, Austria, Germany, the United States, the United Kingdom and elsewhere. Functional groups which are added to morphine and its esters to make active opioids include the benzoyl, acetyl, formyl, propionyl, butroyl, butyl, salicoyl, nicotinoyl, cinnamoyl, and others. It was discovered shortly after the development of dihydromorphine (discovered in nature or first synthesised circa 1880, commercially available in 1900), hydromorphone (first synthesised 1924), and oxymorphone (synthesised 1914), that mono, di, tri, and perhaps tetra- esters could be developed from them as well. A smaller number of esters of codeine, hydrocodone, and dihydrocodeine, and one or two of oxycodone are also known and used in medicine.

== See also ==
- Dibenzoylmorphine
- Dibutyrylmorphine
- Dipropanoylmorphine
