= Cyprodime =

Chemical compound

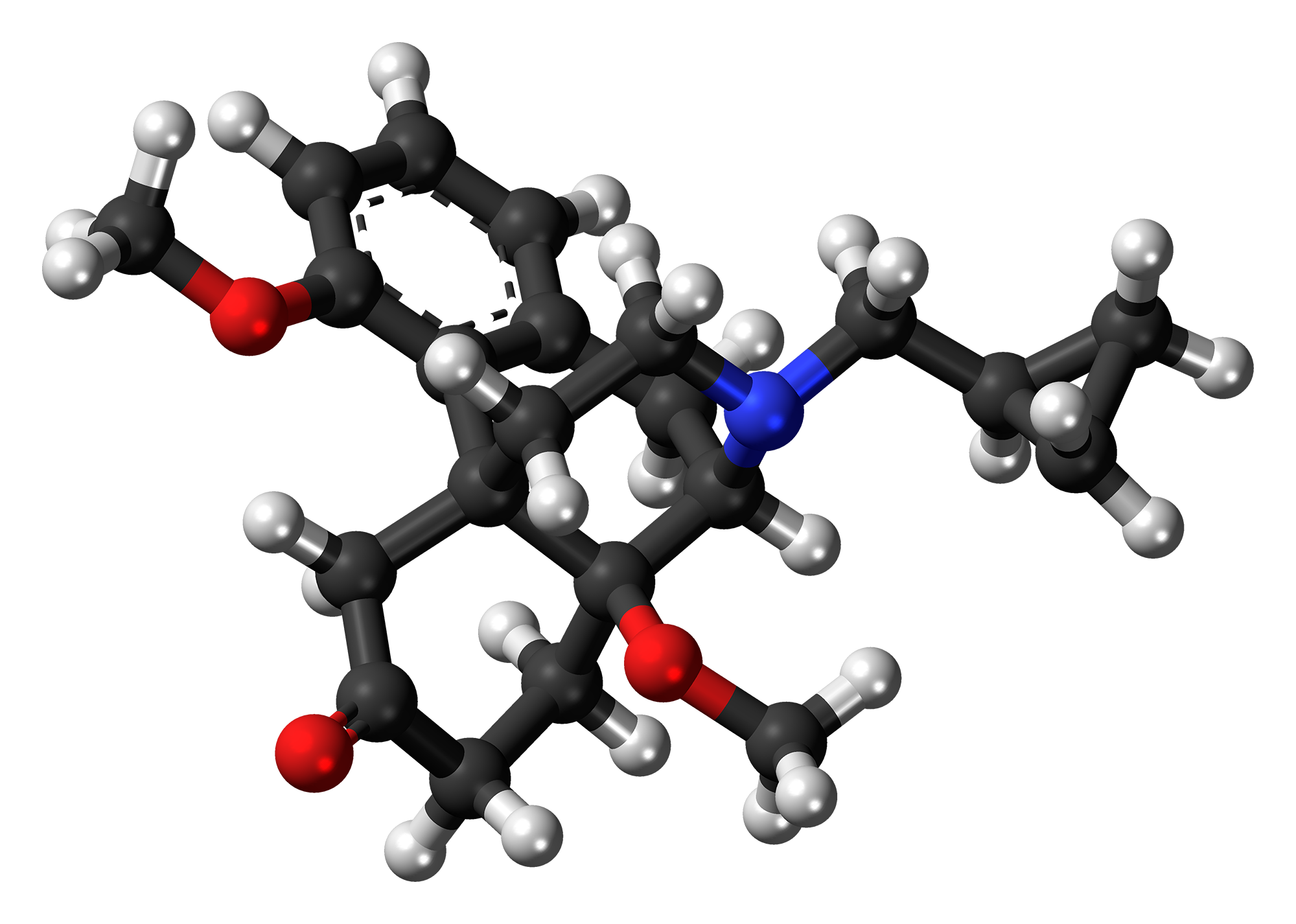

Clinical data
- Other names: Cyprodime
- ATC code: none

Identifiers
- IUPAC name: (–)-N-(Cyclopropylmethyl)-4,14-dimethoxymorphinan-6-one
- CAS Number: 118111-54-9
- PubChem CID: 5748293
- ChemSpider: 20133376
- UNII: 2C6F5L8S8X
- ChEMBL: ChEMBL322796
- CompTox Dashboard (EPA): DTXSID90922601

Chemical and physical data
- Formula: C_{22}H_{29}NO_{3}
- Molar mass: 355.478 g·mol^{−1}
- 3D model (JSmol): Interactive image
- SMILES: O=C4CC[C@@]3(OC)[C@@H]2N(CC[C@]3(c1c(cccc1OC)C2)C4)CC5CC5
- InChI: InChI=1S/C22H29NO3/c1-25-18-5-3-4-16-12-19-22(26-2)9-8-17(24)13-21(22,20(16)18)10-11-23(19)14-15-6-7-15/h3-5,15,19H,6-14H2,1-2H3/t19-,21-,22+/m0/s1; Key:INUCRGMCKDQKNA-ILWGZMRPSA-N

Cyprodime is an opioid antagonist from the morphinan family of drugs.

Cyprodime is a selective opioid antagonist which blocks the μ-opioid receptor, but without affecting the δ-opioid or κ-opioid receptors. This makes it useful for scientific research as it allows the μ-opioid receptor to be selectively deactivated so that the actions of the δ and κ receptors can be studied separately, in contrast to better known opioid antagonists such as naloxone which block all three opioid receptor subtypes.

== See also ==
- Tianeptine, an atypical, selective MOR full-agonist licensed for major depression since 1989.
- Samidorphan, an opioid antagonist preferring the MOR, which is under development for major depression.
