= CTOP =

Selective mu-opioid receptor antagonist peptide

Names
- IUPAC name (4S,7R,10S,13R,16S,19R)-N-[(2S,3R)-1-amino-3-hydroxy-1-oxobutan-2-yl]-19-[[(2R)-2-amino-3-phenylpropanoyl]amino]-10-(3-aminopropyl)-7-[(1R)-1-hydroxyethyl]-16-[(4-hydroxyphenyl)methyl]-13-(1H-indol-3-ylmethyl)-3,3-dimethyl-6,9,12,15,18-pentaoxo-1,2-dithia-5,8,11,14,17-pentazacycloicosane-4-carboxamide

Identifiers
CAS Number	103429-31-8
3D model (JSmol)	Interactive image
ChEBI	CHEBI:230371
ChemSpider	4470595
KEGG	C20160
PubChem CID	5311058
- InChI: InChI=1S/C50H67N11O11S2/c1-26(62)39(42(53)65)59-49(72)41-50(3,4)74-73-25-38(58-43(66)33(52)21-28-11-6-5-7-12-28)47(70)56-36(22-29-16-18-31(64)19-17-29)45(68)57-37(23-30-24-54-34-14-9-8-13-32(30)34)46(69)55-35(15-10-20-51)44(67)60-40(27(2)63)48(71)61-41/h5-9,11-14,16-19,24,26-27,33,35-41,54,62-64H,10,15,20-23,25,51-52H2,1-4H3,(H2,53,65)(H,55,69)(H,56,70)(H,57,68)(H,58,66)(H,59,72)(H,60,67)(H,61,71)/t26-,27-,33-,35+,36+,37-,38+,39+,40+,41-/m1/s1 Key: PZWWYAHWHHNCHO-FGHAYEPSSA-N
- SMILES: C(C=1C=2C(NC1)=CC=CC2)[C@H]3NC(=O)[C@H](CC4=CC=C(O)C=C4)NC(=O)[C@@H](NC([C@@H](CC5=CC=CC=C5)N)=O)CSSC(C)(C)[C@@H](C(N[C@@H]([C@@H](C)O)C(N)=O)=O)NC(=O)[C@]([C@@H](C)O)(NC(=O)[C@H](CCCN)NC3=O)[H]

Properties
Chemical formula	C_{50}H_{67}N_{11}O_{11}S_{2}
Molar mass	1062.27 g·mol^{−1}
- Except where otherwise noted, data are given for materials in their standard state (at 25 °C [77 °F], 100 kPa). Infobox references

CTOP is an opioid antagonist cyclic peptide related to somatostatin. It has been used in research about other opioid ligands.

== Pharmacology ==
CTOP is described as a highly potent mu-opioid receptor antagonist. In mice, its analgesic effects are qualified as being more potent than naloxone's, a well-known opioid antagonist typically used as an antidote in humans. Additionally, CTOP appears to lack significant affinity at the delta and kappa opioid receptors, suggesting that this peptide is selective for the μ receptor.
