= Ketazocine =

Chemical compound

Clinical data
- Routes of administration: Oral
- ATC code: none

Identifiers
- IUPAC name: (2S,6R,11R)-3-(cyclopropylmethyl)-8-hydroxy-6,11-dimethyl-3,4,5,6-tetrahydro-2,6-methano-3-benzazocin-1(2H)-one
- CAS Number: 36292-69-0
- PubChem CID: 3054741
- ChemSpider: 2316328
- UNII: 6IO4IG518S
- KEGG: D04649
- CompTox Dashboard (EPA): DTXSID10897529

Chemical and physical data
- Formula: C_{18}H_{23}NO_{2}
- Molar mass: 285.387 g·mol^{−1}
- 3D model (JSmol): Interactive image
- SMILES: O=C2c1c(cc(O)cc1)[C@]3([C@H]([C@@H]2N(CC3)CC4CC4)C)C
- InChI: InChI=1S/C18H23NO2/c1-11-16-17(21)14-6-5-13(20)9-15(14)18(11,2)7-8-19(16)10-12-3-4-12/h5-6,9,11-12,16,20H,3-4,7-8,10H2,1-2H3/t11-,16-,18+/m0/s1; Key:HQBZLVPZOGIAIQ-SDDDUWNISA-N

Ketazocine (INN), also known as ketocyclazocine, is a benzomorphan derivative used in opioid receptor research. Ketazocine, for which the receptor is named, is an exogenous opioid that binds to the κ opioid receptor.

Activation of this receptor is known to cause sleepiness, a decrease in pain sensation and (potentially) dysphoria, paranoia, and hallucinations. It also causes an increase in urine production because it inhibits the release of vasopressin.

Unlike other opioids, substances that only bind to the κ receptor theoretically do not depress the respiratory system.

The crystal structure of ketazocine was determined in 1983.

== See also ==
- Benzomorphan
- Ethylketazocine
