= Ethylmorphine =

Opioid analgesic and antitussive drug

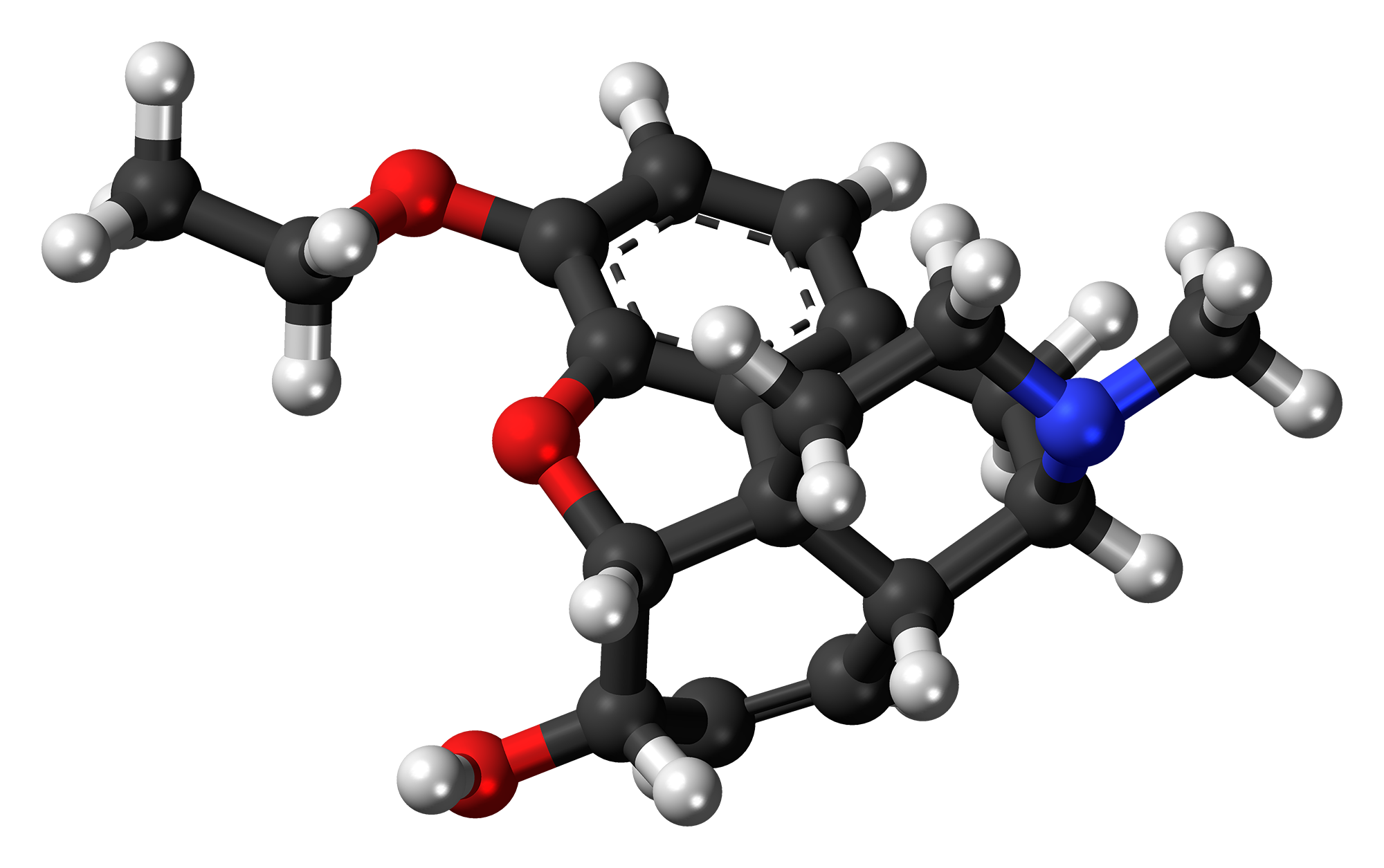

Clinical data
- Trade names: Cosylan, Diolan, Dionina, Diosan, Solvipect, Trachyl
- AHFS/Drugs.com: International Drug Names
- Routes of administration: Oral
- ATC code: R05DA01 (WHO) S01XA06 (WHO)

Legal status
- Legal status: BR: Class A2 (Narcotic drugs); CA: Schedule I; DE: Prescription only (Anlage II for higher doses); UK: Class B; US: Schedule II and Schedule III (In Combination Products); UN: Narcotic Schedule III; SE: Förteckning III

Pharmacokinetic data
- Metabolism: Hepatic, specifically CYP2D6

Identifiers
- IUPAC name: 7,8-didehydro-4,5-α-epoxy- 3-ethoxy-17-methylmorphinan-6-α-ol
- CAS Number: 76-58-4
- PubChem CID: 5359271
- DrugBank: DB01466
- ChemSpider: 4514250
- UNII: RWO67D87EU
- KEGG: D07929
- CompTox Dashboard (EPA): DTXSID1046760
- ECHA InfoCard: 100.000.883

Chemical and physical data
- Formula: C_{19}H_{23}NO_{3}
- Molar mass: 313.397 g·mol^{−1}
- 3D model (JSmol): Interactive image
- SMILES: O[C@H]2\C=C/[C@H]5[C@@H]4N(CC[C@@]51c3c(O[C@H]12)c(OCC)ccc3C4)C
- InChI: InChI=1S/C19H23NO3/c1-3-22-15-7-4-11-10-13-12-5-6-14(21)18-19(12,8-9-20(13)2)16(11)17(15)23-18/h4-7,12-14,18,21H,3,8-10H2,1-2H3/t12-,13+,14-,18-,19-/m0/s1; Key:OGDVEMNWJVYAJL-LEPYJNQMSA-N

Ethylmorphine (also known as codethyline, dionine, and ethyl morphine) is an opioid analgesic and antitussive.

== Side effects ==
Adverse effects are similar to other opioids and include drowsiness, constipation, vertigo, nausea, vomiting, and respiratory depression. Contraindications include asthma, respiratory insufficiency, and age under eight. Ethylmorphine may affect the user's ability to drive and operate heavy machinery, and may cause chemical dependence or addiction at high doses.

== Society and culture ==
Ethylmorphine was first marketed in France in 1953 by Houde, and in Norway and Spain in 1960. It is not marketed in the United States and is a Schedule II controlled substance.

== See also ==
- Codeine
- Dihydrocodeine
- Morphine
- Pholcodine
