= Myrophine =

Chemical compound

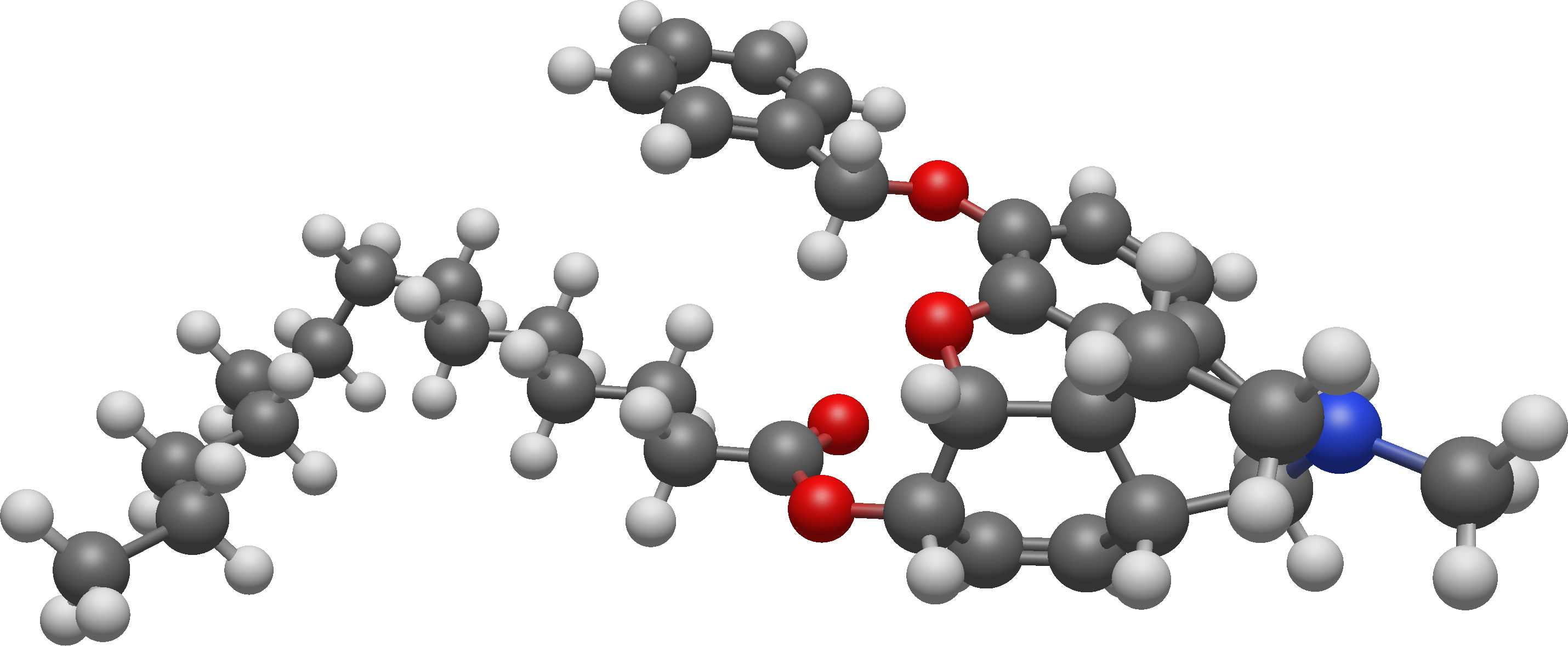

Clinical data
- Other names: Myristylbenzylmorphine
- ATC code: none

Legal status
- Legal status: AU: S9 (Prohibited substance); BR: Class A1 (Narcotic drugs); CA: Schedule I; DE: Anlage I (Authorized scientific use only); US: Schedule I

Identifiers
- IUPAC name: 7,8-didehydro-4,5α-epoxy-17-methyl-3-(phenylmethoxy)-morphinan-6-ol tetradecanoate
- CAS Number: 467-18-5
- PubChem CID: 5362457
- ChemSpider: 4515045
- UNII: 417TUP54OL
- ChEBI: CHEBI:59860
- CompTox Dashboard (EPA): DTXSID40196911

Chemical and physical data
- Formula: C_{38}H_{51}NO_{4}
- Molar mass: 585.829 g·mol^{−1}
- 3D model (JSmol): Interactive image
- SMILES: CCCCCCCCCCCCCC(=O)O[C@H]1C=C[C@H]2[C@H]3CC4=C5[C@]2([C@H]1OC5=C(C=C4)OCC6=CC=CC=C6)CCN3C
- InChI: InChI=1S/C38H51NO4/c1-3-4-5-6-7-8-9-10-11-12-16-19-34(40)42-33-23-21-30-31-26-29-20-22-32(41-27-28-17-14-13-15-18-28)36-35(29)38(30,37(33)43-36)24-25-39(31)2/h13-15,17-18,20-23,30-31,33,37H,3-12,16,19,24-27H2,1-2H3/t30-,31+,33-,37-,38-/m0/s1; Key:GODGZZGKTZQSAL-VXFFQEMOSA-N

Myrophine (Myristylbenzylmorphine) is an opiate analogue that was developed in 1952. It is a derivative of morphine.

Myrophine is substituted with a 3-benzyl group and a 6-myristyl chain. It is metabolised to form benzylmorphine and then further to morphine, and so is a long-acting prodrug for morphine, but with a slow onset of effects. It is weaker than morphine as an analgesic but longer-lasting in effects, and was thought to have more local anesthetic effect than morphine, though with a somewhat greater tendency to cause reactions like itching and rash. In addiction studies conducted in human subjects in the 1950s, myrophine did not substitute for morphine in withdrawal, did not produce notable morphine-like effects, and did not produce addiction or dependence regardless of dose or how it was administered. Consequently, it was thought to be useful in treating pain in addicts who were being detoxified from other opioid drugs.

It is a Schedule I drug in the US, considered to have high potential for abuse and no medical applications, and is controlled under international drug conventions. Myrophine is almost invariably used as the hydrochloride (free base conversion ratio 0.94) and has a DEA Administrative Controlled Substance Control Number of 9308. Myrophine is a Class A controlled substance in the UK, and is on the UN's Yellow list.
