= Methallorphan =

Methallorphan may refer to:

- Dextrallorphan
- Levallorphan

== See also ==
- Methorphan
