= Morphiceptin =

Names
- IUPAC name (2S)-1-[(2S)-2-amino-3-(4-hydroxyphenyl)propanoyl]-N-[(2S)-1-[(2S)-2-carbamoylpyrrolidin-1-yl]-1-oxo-3-phenylpropan-2-yl]pyrrolidine-2-carboxamide
- Other names Tyr-Pro-Phe-Pro-NH2, PLO17

Identifiers
CAS Number	74135-04-9
3D model (JSmol)	Interactive image
ChemSpider	106565
PubChem CID	119303
UNII	97TZA8ANPC
CompTox Dashboard (EPA)	DTXSID10995574
- InChI: InChI=1S/C28H35N5O5/c29-21(16-19-10-12-20(34)13-11-19)27(37)33-15-5-9-24(33)26(36)31-22(17-18-6-2-1-3-7-18)28(38)32-14-4-8-23(32)25(30)35/h1-3,6-7,10-13,21-24,34H,4-5,8-9,14-17,29H2,(H2,30,35)(H,31,36)/t21-,22-,23-,24-/m0/s1 Key: LSQXZIUREIDSHZ-ZJZGAYNASA-N; InChI=1/C28H35N5O5/c29-21(16-19-10-12-20(34)13-11-19)27(37)33-15-5-9-24(33)26(36)31-22(17-18-6-2-1-3-7-18)28(38)32-14-4-8-23(32)25(30)35/h1-3,6-7,10-13,21-24,34H,4-5,8-9,14-17,29H2,(H2,30,35)(H,31,36)/t21-,22-,23-,24-/m0/s1 Key: LSQXZIUREIDSHZ-ZJZGAYNABZ
- SMILES: c1ccc(cc1)C[C@@H](C(=O)N2CCC[C@H]2C(=O)N)NC(=O)[C@@H]3CCCN3C(=O)[C@H](Cc4ccc(cc4)O)N

Properties
Chemical formula	C_{28}H_{35}N_{5}O_{5}
Molar mass	521.6 g/mol
- Except where otherwise noted, data are given for materials in their standard state (at 25 °C [77 °F], 100 kPa). verify (what is ?) Infobox references

Morphiceptin is a tetrapeptide (Tyr-Pro-Phe-Pro-NH_{2}) that is a selective μ-opioid receptor agonist. It is derived from β-casomorphin and has over 1,000 times selectivity for μ- over δ-opioid receptors. When injected intracerebroventricularly (into the ventricular system of the brain), morphiceptin had an analgesic ED_{50} of 1.7 nmol per animal. The analgesic effects of morphiceptin were reversed by naloxone, meaning that the analgesic effect is mediated by the μ-opioid receptor.

Morphiceptin is the (1S,2S,3S,4S)-form whereas deproceptin is the (1S,2S,3S,4R)-form [84799-23-5].

== See also ==
- Casokefamide
