= Bremazocine =

Group of stereoisomers

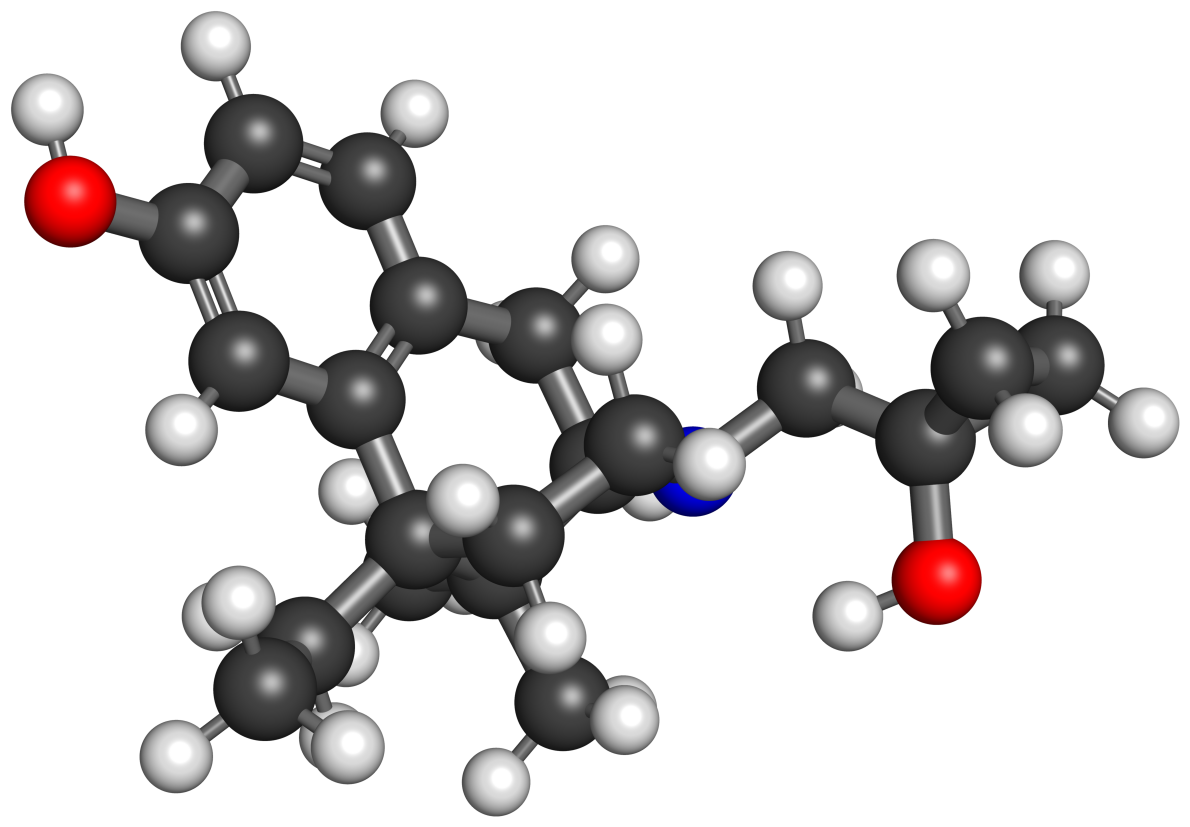

Clinical data
- Routes of administration: Oral
- ATC code: none

Identifiers
- IUPAC name: 6-ethyl- 3-[(1-hydroxycyclopropyl)methyl]- 11,11-dimethyl- 1,2,3,4,5,6-hexahydro- 2,6-methano- 3-benzazocin-8- ol or 2-(1-hydroxy- cyclopropylmethyl)- 5-ethyl- 9,9-dimethyl- 2'-hydroxy- 6,7-benzomorphan
- CAS Number: 83829-76-9
- PubChem CID: 1223
- IUPHAR/BPS: 1603
- ChemSpider: 1186
- UNII: ISF76M2DBE
- ChEMBL: ChEMBL1797687
- CompTox Dashboard (EPA): DTXSID50868536

Chemical and physical data
- Formula: C_{20}H_{29}NO_{2}
- Molar mass: 315.457 g·mol^{−1}
- 3D model (JSmol): Interactive image
- SMILES: OC1(CC1)CN4[C@@H]3Cc2c(cc(O)cc2)[C@@](C3(C)C)(CC4)CC

Bremazocine is a κ-opioid receptor agonist related to pentazocine. It has potent and long-lasting analgesic and diuretic effects. It has 200 times the activity of morphine, but appears to have no addictive properties and does not depress breathing. The crystal structure of bremazocine was determined in 1984

== See also ==
- Benzomorphan
