= Dibenzoylmorphine =

Chemical compound

3,6-dibenzoyl-(5α,6α)-7,8-didehydro-4,5-epoxy-17-methylmorphinan

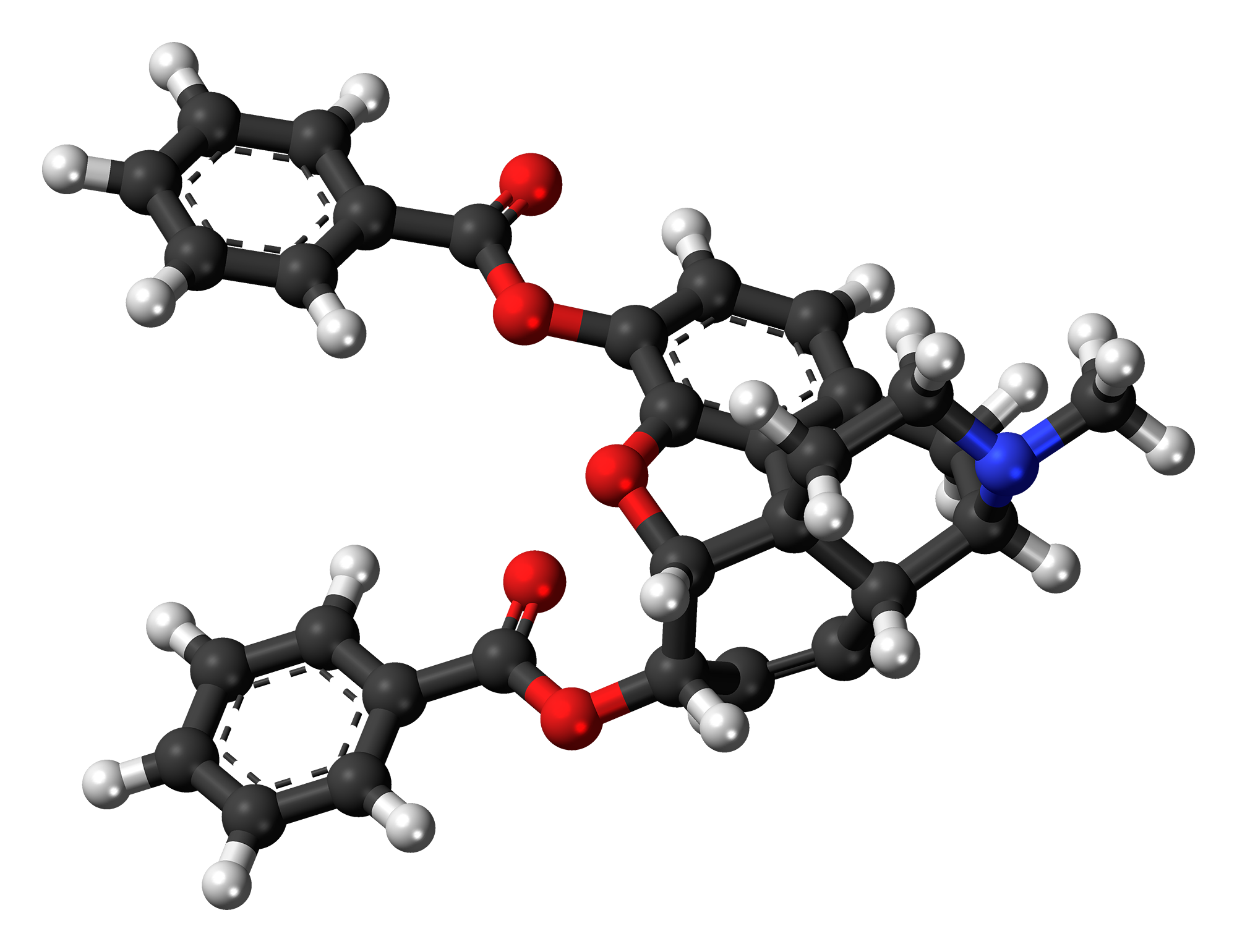

Legal status
- Legal status: Illegal under UN drug conventions as "ester of morphine"

Identifiers
- IUPAC name: [(4R,4Ar,7S,7aR,12bS)-9-benzoyloxy-3-methyl-2,4,4a,7,7a,13-hexahydro-1H-4,12-methanobenzofuro[3,2-e]isoquinolin-7-yl] benzoate
- PubChem CID: 58019102
- ChemSpider: 59650718
- CompTox Dashboard (EPA): DTXSID401018228

Chemical and physical data
- Formula: C_{31}H_{27}NO_{5}
- Molar mass: 493.559 g·mol^{−1}
- 3D model (JSmol): Interactive image
- SMILES: CN1CC[C@]23c4c5ccc(c4O[C@H]2[C@H](C=C[C@H]3[C@H]1C5)OC(=O)c6ccccc6)OC(=O)c7ccccc7
- InChI: InChI=1S/C31H27NO5/c1-32-17-16-31-22-13-15-25(36-30(34)20-10-6-3-7-11-20)28(31)37-27-24(14-12-21(26(27)31)18-23(22)32)35-29(33)19-8-4-2-5-9-19/h2-15,22-23,25,28H,16-18H2,1H3/t22-,23+,25-,28-,31-/m0/s1; Key:TYRXZVFTBRIZFW-LTQSXOHQSA-N

Dibenzoylmorphine is an opioid analogue that is a derivative of morphine. It was developed in the early 1900s after first having been synthesised in 1875 in the UK by the CR Alders Wright organisation at Bayer, along with various other esters of morphine. It was never used medically, instead being widely sold as one of the first "designer drugs" for around five years following the introduction of the first international restrictions on the sale of heroin in 1925. It is described as being virtually identical to heroin and morphine in its effects, and consequently was itself banned internationally in 1930 by the Health Committee of the League of Nations, in order to prevent its sale as an unscheduled alternative to diacetylmorphine. However, it still continues to occasionally be encountered as a result of home manufacture from morphine by drug users.

It is produced in the same fashion as other esters of morphine—treating morphine with an acid anhydride (or some acids or other relatives of acids like acetyl chloride) to get a mono-, di-, tri-, or tetra-ester. Specifically, the original 1875 synthesis was effected by boiling morphine for 2 hours in benzoic anhydride at 130 °C, as was heroin made by using acetic anhydride.

== See also ==
- Acetylpropionylmorphine
- Nicomorphine
