= Naltrindole =

Chemical compound

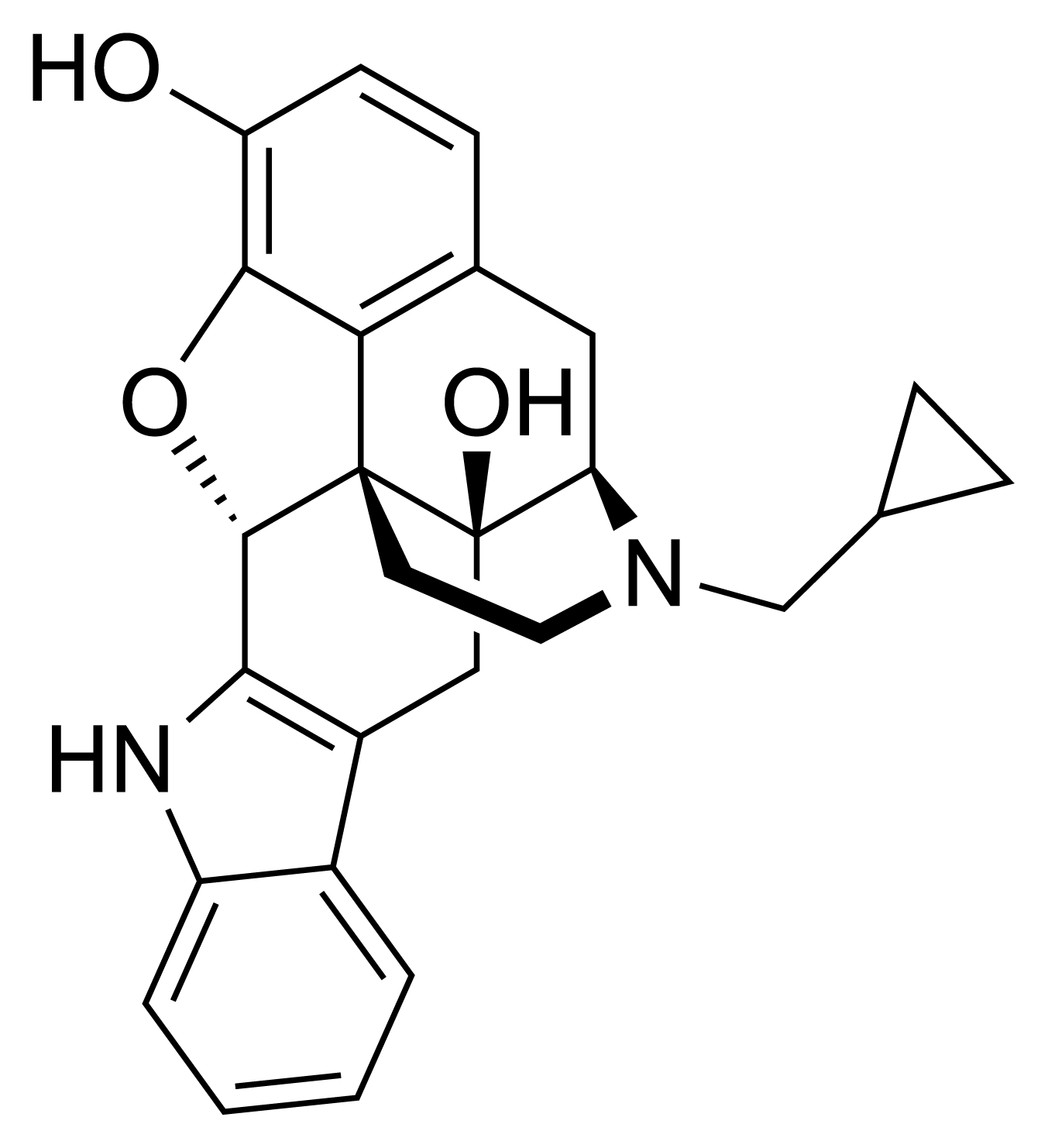

Clinical data
- Routes of administration: IV
- ATC code: none

Identifiers
- IUPAC name: 17-Cyclopropylmethyl-6,7-dehydro-4,5-epoxy -3,14-dihydroxy-6,7,2',3'-indolomorphinan
- CAS Number: 111555-53-4
- PubChem CID: 5497186
- IUPHAR/BPS: 1641
- ChemSpider: 4593753
- UNII: G167Z38QA4
- ChEMBL: ChEMBL567175
- CompTox Dashboard (EPA): DTXSID60912216

Chemical and physical data
- Formula: C_{26}H_{26}N_{2}O_{3}
- Molar mass: 414.505 g·mol^{−1}
- 3D model (JSmol): Interactive image
- SMILES: Oc4c3O[C@H]7c2c(c1ccccc1[nH]2)C[C@@]6(O)[C@H]5N(CC[C@@]67c3c(cc4)C5)CC8CC8
- InChI: InChI=1S/C26H26N2O3/c29-19-8-7-15-11-20-26(30)12-17-16-3-1-2-4-18(16)27-22(17)24-25(26,21(15)23(19)31-24)9-10-28(20)13-14-5-6-14/h1-4,7-8,14,20,24,27,29-30H,5-6,9-13H2/t20-,24+,25+,26-/m1/s1; Key:WIYUZYBFCWCCQJ-IFKAHUTRSA-N

Naltrindole is a highly potent, highly selective delta opioid receptor antagonist used in biomedical research. In May 2012 a paper was published in Nature with the structure of naltrindole in complex with the mouse δ-opioid G-protein coupled receptor, solved by X-ray crystallography.

== Drug design ==
Since peptide compounds are unable to cross the blood–brain barrier, researchers developed naltrindole to be a non-peptide antagonist analog of the delta-preferring endogenous opiate enkephalin. Enkephalin contains an aromatic phenyl group on its Phe^{4} residue, which was hypothesized to be the "address" sequence responsible for the opiate's delta opioid receptor affinity. Thus, attachment of a phenyl-containing indole molecule to the C-ring of naltrexone's morphinan base successfully produced a drug with the high receptor affinity of naltrexone, but which binds almost exclusively to the delta opioid receptor.
