= Utopioid (drug class) =

Utopioids (U-type opioids) are a class of synthetic opioid analgesic drugs first developed in the 1970s by the pharmaceutical company Upjohn. However, they were never marketed for medical use. Some compounds from this class have been used for scientific research as model kappa opioid receptor agonists. In the mid-2010s, one mu opioid receptor selective compound from this class, U-47700, re-emerged as a designer drug and became widely sold around the world for several years before being banned in various jurisdictions from 2016 onwards. Following the prohibition of U-47700, a number of related compounds have continued to appear on illicit drug markets. They are often marketed online or included as components in mixtures sold under the guise of "street heroin." U-47700 itself is the most potent mu opioid agonist from this class, with around 7 to 10 times the potency of morphine. Some other compounds such as 3,4-MDO-U-47700 and N-Ethyl-U-47700 retain similar mu selectivity but with lower potency similar to that of morphine, while others have a mixture of mu- and kappa-mediated effects, such as U-48800. Most utopioid derivatives are, however, selective kappa agonists, which may have limited abuse potential as dissociative hallucinogens, but do not alleviate withdrawal distress in opioid dependent individuals or maintain addiction in a typical sense. Nevertheless, this has not stopped them from being sold as designer drugs, and a number of these compounds are now banned in many jurisdictions alongside U-47700 itself.

== Table of utopioids ==
Structure	Name	PubChem	CAS #
	U-47109	44269286	67579-13-9
	U-47700	13544016	82657-23-6
	U-47931E (Bromadoline)	6328449	2418521-61-4
	U-48520	13544026	67579-11-7
	U-48800	137700072	2370977-17-4
	U-49132E	6444176	142013-42-1
	U-49524E	132402	142013-44-3
	U-49900	129392412	67579-76-4
	U-50211	13544017	98587-47-4
	U-50488	3036289	67198-13-4
	U-51574	44269303	
	U-54494A	122015	92953-41-8
	U-62066 (Spiradoline)	55652	87151-85-7
	U-69593	105104	96744-75-1
	U-77891	117071705	119878-31-8
	N-Desmethyl-U-47700	129390993	67579-73-1
	N,N-Didesmethyl-U-47700	129406364	2616858-81-0
	3,4-MDO-U-47700	139598237	2488874-96-8
	3,4-Ethylenedioxy-U-47700	137700298	2749619-08-5
	3,4-Ethylenedioxy-U-51574	137700374	2748623-91-6
	N-Ethyl-U-47700	155907846	
	N-Propyl-U-47700	137700434	2749433-76-7
	N-Isopropyl-U-47700	137700166	2748319-16-4
	N-Cyclopropyl-U-47700	165361451	
	N-Methoxy-U-47700	155907659	
	N-Methyl-U-47931E	54482637	75570-38-6
	3,4-Dibromo-U-47700		
	3,4-Difluoro-U-47700	165362347	2417942-54-0
	2,4-Difluoro-U-48800		
	4-TFM-U-48520 (U-04)	53720446	67579-38-8
	α-U10	165362154	2417942-61-9
	β-U10	54524276	67579-80-0

== See also ==
- List of benzimidazole opioids
- List of fentanyl analogues
- List of orphine opioids
