= Enadoline =

Chemical compound

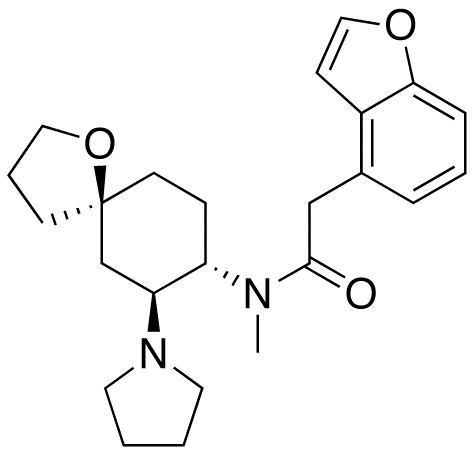

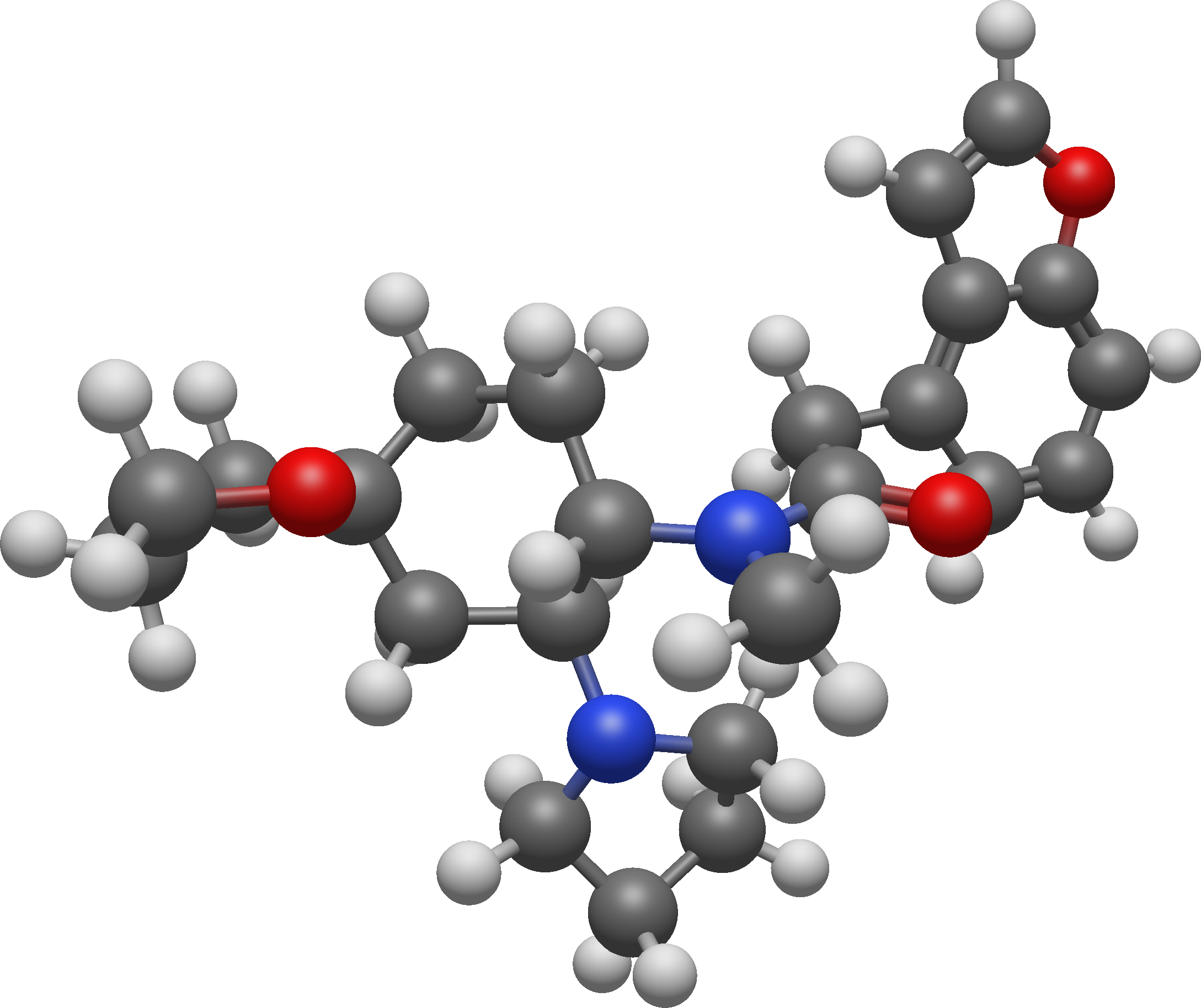

Clinical data
- Other names: CI-977; CI977
- Drug class: κ-Opioid receptor agonist; Hallucinogen
- ATC code: None

Identifiers
- IUPAC name: 2-(1-Benzofuran-4-yl)-N-methyl-N-[(5R,7S,8S)-7-pyrrolidin-1-yl-1-oxaspiro[4.5]decan-8-yl]acetamide
- CAS Number: 124378-77-4
- PubChem CID: 60768
- IUPHAR/BPS: 1646
- ChemSpider: 54765
- UNII: KJL283326C
- ChEMBL: ChEMBL318859
- CompTox Dashboard (EPA): DTXSID4047258

Chemical and physical data
- Formula: C_{24}H_{32}N_{2}O_{3}
- Molar mass: 396.531 g·mol^{−1}
- 3D model (JSmol): Interactive image
- SMILES: O=C(Cc1cccc2occc12)N(C)C1CCC2(CCCO2)CC1N1CCCC1
- InChI: InChI=1S/C24H32N2O3/c1-25(23(27)16-18-6-4-7-22-19(18)9-15-28-22)20-8-11-24(10-5-14-29-24)17-21(20)26-12-2-3-13-26/h4,6-7,9,15,20-21H,2-3,5,8,10-14,16-17H2,1H3/t20-,21-,24-/m0/s1; Key:JMBYBVLCYODBJQ-HFMPRLQTSA-N

Enadoline (developmental code name CI-977) is a drug which acts as a highly selective κ-opioid agonist.

In human studies, it produced visual distortions and feelings of dissociation, reminiscent of the effects of salvinorin A.

It was studied as a potential analgesic, but abandoned because of the dose-limiting effects of dysphoria, which could be expected from a κ-opioid agonist. There was mention of its potential in treating comatose head injury or stroke victims, where that type of side effect would be immaterial. It has been found to reduce the euphoric effects of cocaine but did not alter cocaine self-administration in humans.

When enadoline was first reported in 1990, it was "the most potent κ-selective analgesic ever reported ... 25 times more potent than morphine and 17 times more potent than U-62066".

== See also ==
- κ-Opioid receptor agonist
- U-69,593
- U-50,488
- U-77891
- AH-7921
- Bromadoline
