= C16H22Cl2N2O =

The molecular formula C_{16}H_{22}Cl_{2}N_{2}O (molar mass: 329.26 g/mol, exact mass: 328.1109 u) may refer to:

- AH-7921
- Eclanamine (U-48,753)
- U-47700
