= 3,4-MDO-U-47700 =

Opioid analgesic designer drug

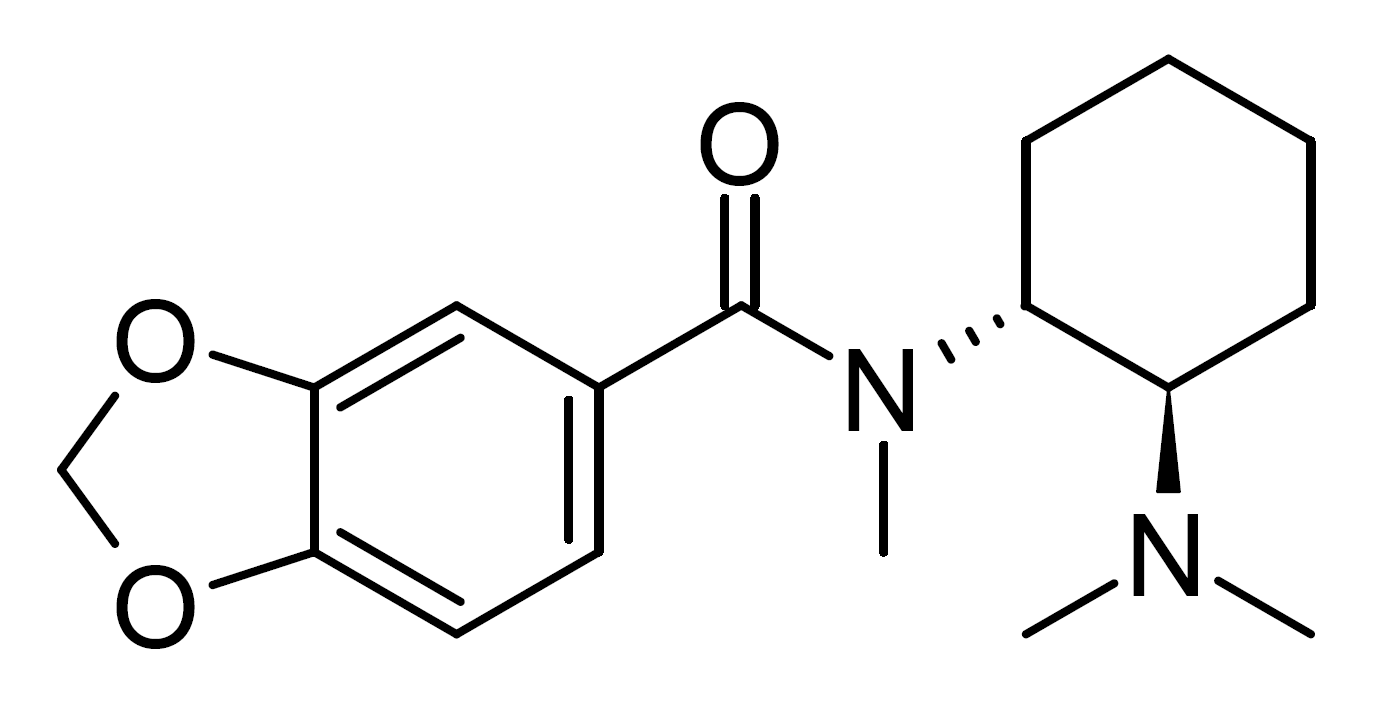

Identifiers
- IUPAC name: N-[(1R,2R)-2-(dimethylamino)cyclohexyl]-N-methyl-1,3-benzodioxole-5-carboxamide
- CAS Number: 2488874-96-8
- PubChem CID: 139598237
- ChemSpider: 95636419
- UNII: QNU017P53C
- CompTox Dashboard (EPA): DTXSID601018393

Chemical and physical data
- Formula: C_{17}H_{24}N_{2}O_{3}
- Molar mass: 304.390 g·mol^{−1}
- 3D model (JSmol): Interactive image
- SMILES: CN(C)[C@@H]1CCCC[C@H]1N(C)C(=O)C2=CC3=C(C=C2)OCO3
- InChI: InChI=1S/C17H24N2O3/c1-18(2)13-6-4-5-7-14(13)19(3)17(20)12-8-9-15-16(10-12)22-11-21-15/h8-10,13-14H,4-7,11H2,1-3H3/t13-,14-/m1/s1; Key:UUAVKYBZWVMWSM-ZIAGYGMSSA-N

3,4-MDO-U-47700 is an opioid analgesic which has been sold as a designer drug, first appearing in 2017 after U-47700 itself was banned in various jurisdictions. It is less potent than U-47700 but is still a full agonist at the μ-opioid receptor, with slightly higher potency than morphine. It is illegal in Virginia.

== See also ==
- β‐U10
- AH-7921
- U-48800
- U-50488
- U-69,593
- U-77891
