= U-48800 =

Chemical compound

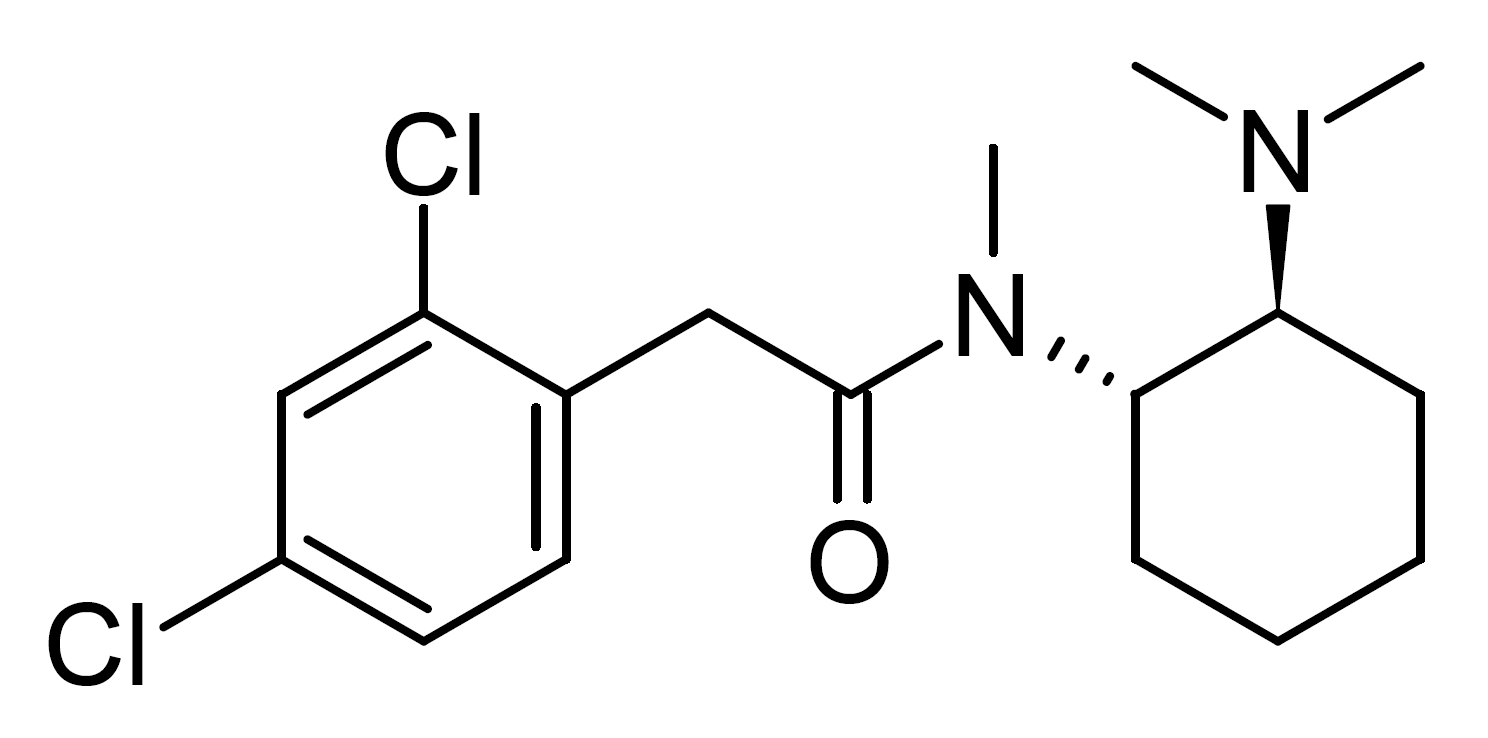

Identifiers
- IUPAC name: 2-(2,4-dichlorophenyl)-N-[(1S,2S)-2-(dimethylamino)cyclohexyl]-N-methylacetamide
- CAS Number: 2370977-17-4
- PubChem CID: 137700072
- UNII: C1X8MF00M5

Chemical and physical data
- Formula: C_{17}H_{24}Cl_{2}N_{2}O
- Molar mass: 343.29 g·mol^{−1}
- 3D model (JSmol): Interactive image
- SMILES: CN(C)[C@H]1CCCC[C@@H]1N(C)C(=O)CC2=C(C=C(C=C2)Cl)Cl
- InChI: InChI=1S/C17H24Cl2N2O/c1-20(2)15-6-4-5-7-16(15)21(3)17(22)10-12-8-9-13(18)11-14(12)19/h8-9,11,15-16H,4-7,10H2,1-3H3/t15-,16-/m0/s1; Key:FKUWIGXXBMULOI-HOTGVXAUSA-N

U-48800 is an opioid analgesic which has been sold as a designer drug. Unlike U-47700, it is primarily active as a kappa opioid receptor agonist with only moderate affinity at the mu opioid receptor. Nevertheless, it has still appeared on the recreational drug market, often as a component of combinations with other drugs, and has been linked to numerous drug overdose cases.

== See also ==
- 3,4-MDO-U-47700
- AH-7921
- Butorphanol
- Pentazocine
- U-50488
- U-69,593
- U-77891
