= CL 110,393 =

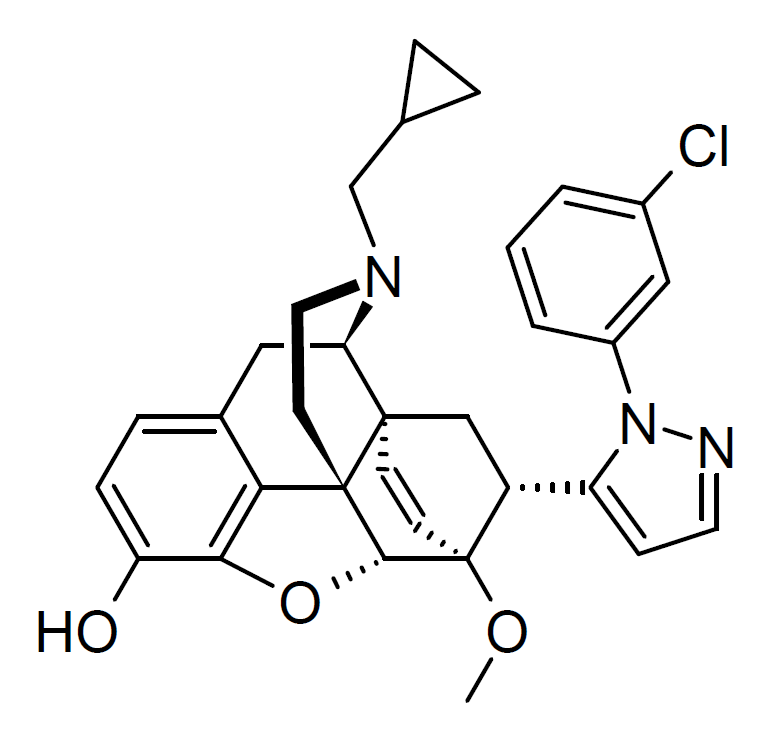

Chemical and physical data
- Formula: C_{32}H_{32}ClN_{3}O_{3}
- Molar mass: 542.08 g·mol^{−1}
- 3D model (JSmol): Interactive image
- SMILES: Clc1cccc(c1)n1nccc1[C@H]1C[C@]23C=C[C@]1(OC)[C@@H]1Oc4c(O)ccc5C[C@H]2N(CC[C@]13c54)CC1CC1

CL 110,393 is an opioid drug derived from thebaine, closely related to the family of drugs known as the Bentley compounds which includes better known examples such as buprenorphine, etorphine and diprenorphine. Unlike most other related compounds, CL 110,393 acts as a highly selective κ-opioid receptor agonist with negligible activity at the μ-opioid receptor. It produces hallucinogenic effects with high potency and a long duration of action, as well as side effects such as dysphoria, tinnitus, slurred speech, ataxia, perspiration and tingling of the skin, and was investigated as a non-lethal incapacitating agent.

== See also ==
- Enadoline
- GR-89696
- HZ-2
- Salvinorin B methoxymethyl ether
