= Days of the Fallen Sun =

2014 musical recording by Junius

- Album cover illustration by Adrian Brouchy

EP by Junius
- Released: February 18, 2014
- Recorded: Radar Studios, Clinton, CT
- Genre: Art rock, space rock, post-metal, alternative metal
- Length: 24:44
- Label: Prosthetic
- Producer: Junius, Will Benoit

Junius chronology
Reports from the Threshold of Death (2011)	Days of the Fallen Sun (2014)	Eternal Rituals for the Accretion of Light (2017)

Days of the Fallen Sun is the fourth EP by American art rock band Junius. It was released on February 18, 2014, through Prosthetic. The track "The Time Of Perfect Virtue" was originally recorded on the split EP Junius / Juarez, while the track "A Day Dark With Night" was originally recorded on the split EP Junius / Rosetta. The track "Forgiving The Cleansing Meteor" was made available for streaming on Pitchfork prior to the EPs release.

== Critical reception ==
Professional ratings
Review scores
Source	Rating
Alternative Press	4/5 stars
Blabbermouth	8.5/10
MetalSucks	4/5 stars
Pitchfork	6.8/10

At Alternative Press, Tim Karan rated the album four out of five stars, writing that "Noticeably more similar to Catastrophist that 2011's more sonically diverse Reports From The Threshold Of Death, it's headphone music at its most majestic and macabre."

== Track listing ==
Days of the Fallen Sun track listing.

1. "(Meditations)" – 0:40
2. "The Time of Perfect Virtue" – 4:52
3. "(Shamanic Rituals)" – 0:49
4. "A Day Dark With Night" – 7:20
5. "(The Purge)" – 0:36
6. "Battle in the Sky" – 3:32
7. "(Nothingness)" – 0:56
8. "Forgiving the Cleansing Meteor" – 5:59

Vinyl digital download bonus tracks

1. "A Universe Without Stars" (Living Phantoms Remix)
2. "All Shall Float" (Zack Martin Remix)

== Personnel ==
Days of the Fallen Sun album personnel adapted from CD liner notes.

Junius

- Joseph E. Martinez – guitar, vocals, lyrics, synths
- Michael Repasch-Nieves – guitar, album art design and layout
- Joel Munguia – bass
- Dana Filloon – drums

Additional personnel

- Justin Forrest Trujillo – additional percussion on "Forgiving the Cleansing Meteor"
- Will Benoit – co-producer, mixing, mastering

Album artwork

- Coven Illustación (Adrian Brouchy) – cover illustration
- Matt Schwab – coloring
- Matt Gauck – interior illustrations
