= Junius (album) =

- Cover Artwork by Michael Repasch-Nieves

Compilation album by Junius
- Released: October 8, 2007 (UK); October 9, 2007 (US); February 8, 2008 (EU)
- Genre: Art rock, post-rock, indie rock
- Length: 41:22 (standard edition); 45:41 (bonus track edition)
- Label: The Mylene Sheath, Radar Recordings, & SAF Records (North America release); Make My Day Records (Europe release); Cargo Records (UK release)
- Producer: Will Benoit

Junius chronology
| The Fires of Antediluvia (2007) | Junius (2007) | The Martyrdom of a Catastrophist (2009) |

Vinyl edition cover art
- The Mylene Sheath – Sheath020

Junius is a self-titled compilation album by American art rock band Junius that compiles the Blood Is Bright EP and the Forcing Out the Silence EP into one collection. The album features remastered tracks from both EPs, while the CD and Vinyl formats include additional content such as expanded artwork, and lyrics.

Decoy Music included Junius in their "Most Anticipated Albums of 2007" list.

== Release history ==
The compilation was initially released in North America on October 9, 2007, by Radar Recordings, and SAF Records.

To promote the release further, the band made their self-titled album available through European based record label Make My Day Records on February 8, 2008. The Make My Day Records release includes an alternate version of the front cover artwork and an exclusive bonus track titled "Lost in Basilica", a song that was recorded by the band during The Blood is Bright sessions.

Two years later, Junius was re-released in limited edition vinyl and digital download format via The Mylene Sheath on June 15, 2010, featuring new artwork. The vinyl release has since gone out-of-print.

Professional ratings
Review scores
| Source | Rating |
|---|---|
| Allmusic | 4/5 stars |
| Exclaim! | (favorable) |
| The Punk Vault | 5/5 stars |
| Deaf Sparrow Zine | 4/5 stars |

== Track listing ==
All tracks are written by Junius.

| No. | Title | Length |
|---|---|---|
| 1. | "[Elan Vital]" | 1:12 |
| 2. | "Hiding Knives" | 5:27 |
| 3. | "From the Isle of the Blessed" | 5:05 |
| 4. | "[Elan Fatale]" | 2:11 |
| 5. | "Forcing out the Silence" | 6:43 |
| 6. | "[The Annunciation]" | 0:35 |
| 7. | "Blood Is Bright" | 4:51 |
| 8. | "A Word Could Kill Her" | 5:53 |
| 9. | "In the Hearts of Titans" | 5:53 |
| 10. | "At the Age of Decay" | 5:17 |
| Total length: | | 41:22 |

Import-only bonus track
| No. | Title | Length |
|---|---|---|
| 11. | "Lost in Basilica" | 4:19 |
| Total length: | | 45:41 |

== Personnel ==
Junius

- Joseph E. Martinez – guitar, vocals
- Michael Repasch-Nieves – guitar
- Dave Soucy – bass (tracks 1–5)
- Kieffer Infantino – bass (tracks 6–11)
- Dana Filloon – drums

Production

- Will Benoit – production
- Nick Zampiello – mastering at New Alliance East in Cambridge, MA
