= Utopioid =

Utopioid may refer to:

- Utopioid (album)
- Utopioid (drug class)
