= Β-U10 =

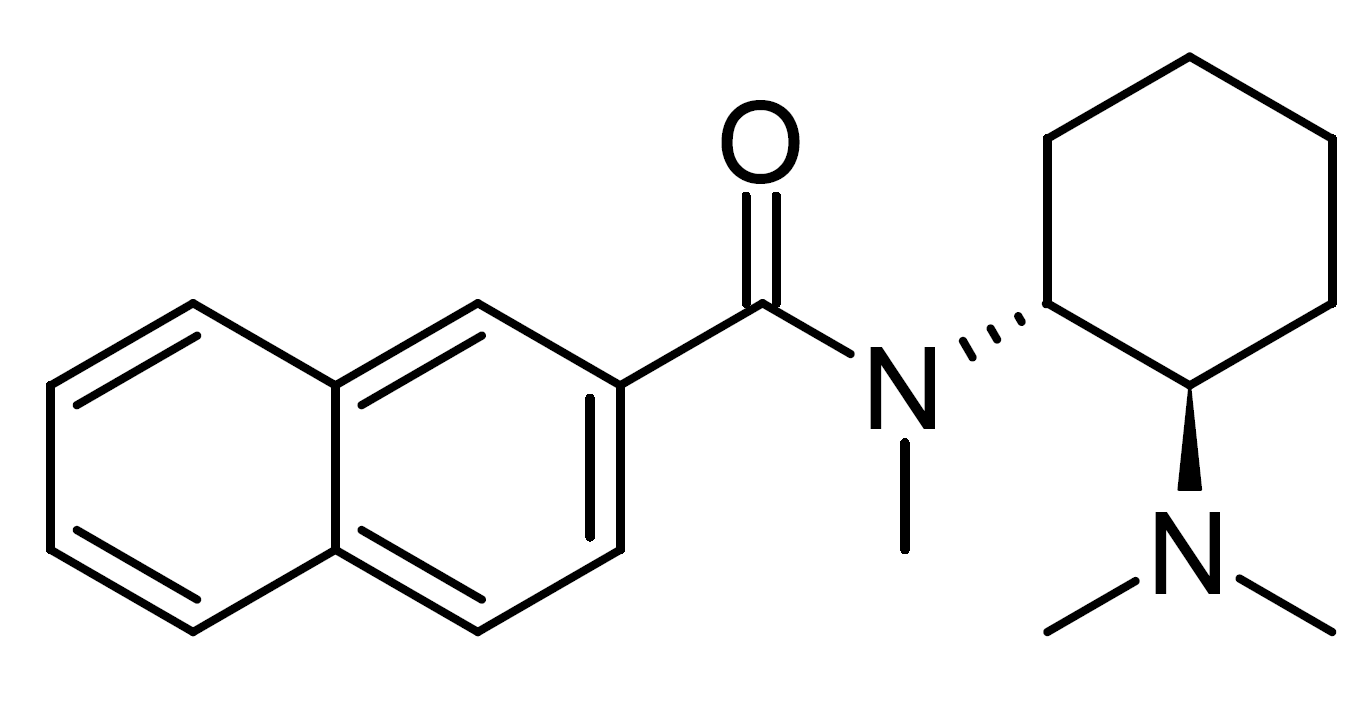

Identifiers
- IUPAC name: N-[(1R,2R)-2-(dimethylamino)cyclohexyl]-N-methylnaphthalene-2-carboxamide
- CAS Number: 67579-80-0
- PubChem CID: 54524276
- ChemSpider: 109107961
- UNII: 2QD2B7S3L5

Chemical and physical data
- Formula: C_{20}H_{26}N_{2}O
- Molar mass: 310.441 g·mol^{−1}
- 3D model (JSmol): Interactive image
- SMILES: CN(C)[C@@H]1CCCC[C@H]1N(C)C(=O)C2=CC3=CC=CC=C3C=C2
- InChI: InChI=1S/C20H26N2O/c1-21(2)18-10-6-7-11-19(18)22(3)20(23)17-13-12-15-8-4-5-9-16(15)14-17/h4-5,8-9,12-14,18-19H,6-7,10-11H2,1-3H3/t18-,19-/m1/s1; Key:YRZZSLYUFWBIIK-RTBURBONSA-N

β‐U10 is an opioid analgesic which has been sold as a designer drug, closely related to the so-called utopioid derivative U-47700. It is slightly less than half the potency of U-47700 in animal testing, but this still makes it several times the potency of morphine. It has generally been identified by analytical laboratories after having been misrepresented as better known drugs such as heroin, usually as a mixture with other designer opioids and/or sedatives, rather than intentionally purchased in its own right.

== See also ==
- 3,4-MDO-U-47700
- AH-7921
- U-48800
