= Eclanamine =

Chemical compound

Clinical data
- ATC code: None

Identifiers
- IUPAC name: N-(3,4-dichlorophenyl)-N-[(1R,2R)-2-(dimethylamino)cyclopentyl]propanamide
- CAS Number: 67450-44-6; maleate: 67450-45-7
- PubChem CID: 130380
- ChemSpider: 115358
- UNII: 5Y67H9W4KQ; maleate: J2C169J769

Chemical and physical data
- Formula: C_{16}H_{22}Cl_{2}N_{2}O
- Molar mass: 329.27 g·mol^{−1}
- 3D model (JSmol): Interactive image
- SMILES: Clc2ccc(N(C(=O)CC)[C@@H]1CCC[C@H]1N(C)C)cc2Cl
- InChI: InChI=1S/C16H22Cl2N2O/c1-4-16(21)20(11-8-9-12(17)13(18)10-11)15-7-5-6-14(15)19(2)3/h8-10,14-15H,4-7H2,1-3H3/t14-,15-/m1/s1; Key:YCRFSKUCDBJWLX-HUUCEWRRSA-N

Eclanamine (U-48,753) is a drug which was patented as an antidepressant, but was never marketed. It acts by inhibiting the reuptake of serotonin and norepinephrine.

== See also ==
- U-50,488
- Bromadoline
