= C20H26N2O =

The molecular formula C_{20}H_{26}N_{2}O (molar mass: 310.43 g/mol, exact mass: 310.2045 u) may refer to:

- Anilopam
- Ibogaine
- Tabernanthine
- Viqualine
- β-U10
