= The Fires of Antediluvia =

- Cover Artwork by Michael Repasch-Nieves

EP by Junius
- Released: May 1, 2007
- Recorded: January 30, 2007 at Zumix Studios, Boston, MA
- Genre: Art rock, post-rock, indie rock
- Length: 13:25
- Label: Radar Recordings (vinyl) (RDR-116); Anchorless Records (vinyl) (ALR:006)
- Producer: Junius

Junius chronology
Blood Is Bright (2006)	The Fires of Antediluvia (2007)	Junius (2007)

Anchorless Records cover art
- Cover Artwork by Michael Repasch-Nieves

Professional ratings
Review scores
Source	Rating
Punknews.org	3.5/5 stars
Crustcake	8.5/10 stars

The Fires of Antediluvia is the third EP by American art rock band Junius. It was released as a limited edition 7" vinyl through Radar Recordings and Anchorless Records on May 1, 2007. It was also made available as a digital download through Radar Recordings.

== Release and distribution ==
The 7" vinyl release was limited to 500 copies. 250 copies were distributed through Radar Recordings and 250 through Anchorless Records. The 250 copies distributed through Radar Recordings were hand numbered and released in 5 different shades, with each shade representing the five elements: wind, water, fire, earth, and æther. The release was limited to one pressing, and is currently out-of-print.

== Track listing ==
All tracks are written by Junius.

No.	Title	Length
1.	"The Fires of Antediluvia"	6:55
2.	"Centurion"	6:30
Total length:		13:25

== Notes ==
- "The Fires of Antediluvia" is an earlier version of the track "The Antediluvian Fires" which would later appear on the bands full-length album The Martyrdom of a Catastrophist.
- This is the band's first release to feature the current line-up, with Joel Munguia serving as the band's permanent bassist from this point on.

== Personnel ==
Junius

- Joseph E. Martinez – guitar, vocals
- Michael Repasch-Nieves – guitar
- Joel Munguia – bass
- Dana Filloon – drums

Production

- P. J. Goodwin – recording
- Nick Zampiello – mastering
