= A Determinism of Morality =

Studio album by Rosetta
- Released: May 25, 2010
- Recorded: November–December 2009
- Studios: Translator Audio; Brooklyn, New York
- Genres: Post-metal; post-rock; space rock
- Length: 47:44
- Label: Translation Loss
- Producers: Andrew Schneider; Rosetta

Rosetta chronology
The Cleansing Undertones of Wake/Lift (2007)	A Determinism of Morality (2010)	Junius / Rosetta (2011)

Professional ratings
Review scores
Source	Rating
AbsolutePunk	(90%)
Allmusic	3.5/5 stars
Decoy Music	4.5/5 stars
inferanlmasquerade.com	(88/100)
Metal Injection	(3.5/5)
Metal Review	8.5/10 stars
Metal Storm	(7.9/10)
The NewReview	2.5/5 stars
Plug In Music	A
Sputnikmusic	(4.5/5)

A Determinism of Morality is the third full-length album by post-metal band Rosetta. The album was released on May 25, 2010, through Translation Loss Records.

== Track listing ==
A Determinism of Morality track listing
No.	Title	Length
1.	"Ayil"	4:59
2.	"Je N'en Connais Pas La Fin"	6:49
3.	"Blue Day for Croatoa"	6:37
4.	"Release"	5:36
5.	"Revolve"	6:43
6.	"Renew"	6:09
7.	"A Determinism of Morality"	10:51
Total length:		47:44

- "Je N'en Connais Pas La Fin" translates to "I Do Not Know Its End"
- "Release", "Revolve", and "Renew" are named after lyrics from "Monument", a song from the band's 2007 album Wake/Lift

== Personnel ==
A Determinism of Morality personnel adapted from liner notes.

Rosetta

- Michael Armine – sound manipulation, vocals, production
- David Grossman – bass, backing vocals, production
- Bruce McMurtrie Jr. – drums, backing vocals, production
- J. Matthew Weed – guitar, production

Guest

- Eric Jernigan – backing vocals

Technical

- Andrew Schneider – production, engineering, mixing
- Nick Zampiello – mastering
- Mike Wohlberg – artwork
- Christina Brown – photography
