= Temporal Lapse =

Studio album by Rosetta
- Released: November 27, 2026
- Recorded: July 2024–December 2025
- Studios: Radar Studio; Clinton, Connecticut; The Music Room; Austin, Texas
- Label: Pelagic
- Producers: Matt Weed; Rosetta

Rosetta chronology
Utopioid (2017)	Temporal Lapse (2026)

Temporal Lapse is the upcoming seventh studio album by post-metal band Rosetta. It is set for release on November 27, 2026, via Pelagic Records

== Background ==
In September 2026, Rosetta announced their seventh studio album, Temporal Lapse, which is stated to be their last. The announcement came with the release of a new song, "The Native Hue of Resolution", along with an album trailer. In October, the band released a second song, "The Winepress", along with a second album trailer. In November, the band shared a third song, "Self-Dealing Position", along with a third trailer.

Thematically, Temporal Lapse draws loosely from the five stages of grief.

== Recording ==
The recording process was handled by Matt Weed and Rosetta, with mixing done by Jeremy S.H. Griffin. Drums were tracked over a week-long period in a stone church sanctuary outside Philadelphia, Pennsylvania, where Rosetta had their first-ever rehearsal in 2003. Guitars and bass were recorded in August 2024 at Radar Studio in Clinton, Connecticut. Vocal parts were written and recorded over ten days in December 2025 at The Music Room in Austin, Texas.

== Release ==
Temporal Lapse is set for release on November 27, 2026, via Pelagic Records The album will be available through Bandcamp (using the pay what you want price system) and in physical formats. A bonus track that does not appear on streaming services will be available to those who purchase the album.

== Track listing ==
Temporal Lapse track listing
No.	Title	Length
1.	"Curl Up and Deny"
2.	"The Winepress"	5:47
3.	"Dvora"
4.	"Self-Dealing Position"	7:21
5.	"The Native Hue of Resolution"	7:59
6.	"The Pale Cast of Thought"
7.	"Ribbon of Dawn"

Bonus track
No.	Title	Length
8.	"Epilogue"

== Personnel ==
Rosetta

- Mike Armine – vocals, samples, production
- Dave Grossman – bass, production
- Eric Jernigan – guitar, vocals, production
- B.J. McMurtrie – drums, production
- Matt Weed – guitar, bass, engineering, production

Guests

- Joey Wright, Pete Givens, and Eric Soelzer – gang vocals
- Johnny Dang – slide guitar, synthesizer, piano (on "Dvora")

Technical

- Jeremy S.H. Griffith – mixing
- Carl Saff – mastering
- Mike Wohlberg – artwork, layout
