= Junius / Juarez =

- Front cover photograph by Andrew Weiss

EP by Junius and Juarez
- Released: April 01, 2010
- Genre: Post-metal, sludge metal
- Length: 14:01
- Label: UsTwo Records (vinyl) (UTR-03)

Junius chronology
The Martyrdom of a Catastrophist (2009)	Junius / Juarez (2010)	Junius / Rosetta (2011)

Juarez chronology
Junius / Juarez (2010)

Junius / Juarez is a 10-inch vinyl split EP by American art rock band Junius and American post metal band Juarez. The release was limited, with only 500 copies pressed for distribution. The record was released by UsTwo Records, an independent record label that specializes in releasing vinyl only split releases.

== Track listing ==
Album tracks
No.	Title	Music	Length
1.	"The Time of Perfect Virtue"	Junius	4:50
2.	"Old River, Dry River"	Juarez	9:11

== Personnel ==
Junius

- Joseph E. Martinez – vocals, lyrics, guitar, synths
- Michael Repasch-Nieves – guitar
- Joel Munguia – bass
- Dana Filloon – drums

Juarez

- Dana Fehr – guitar, vocals
- Mike Sanger – drums
- Johnnie Munger – bass, vocals
- Tom Beach – guitar

Artwork

- Andrew Weiss – photography
- Helder Pedro Moreira – design
- Michael Repasch-Nieves – art direction and layout
