= Nitro Mega Prayer =

Japanese screamo band

- Origin: Japan
- Genres: Screamo
- Years active: 1999-present

Nitro Mega Prayer is a screamo band from Japan, formed in 1999. They are best known for their 2005 release "Songs of Hypocrisy", as well as concert tours in the US and Japan.

== Background ==
They started in January 1999 with Nakano (vocals), and Amano (guitar). They became a quintet with the introduction of Shimeda (guitar), Atsushi (bass), and Rinta (drums) in December 2000. Their intense and energetic live performances are characteristic of the Japanese screamo sound.

== Discography and tour ==
In 2005, they finished a CD titled "Songs of Hypocrisy" in which the sound quality is much improved over their previous albums.

2005 brought a split CD with the Philadelphia screamo / chaotic hardcore band Balboa, which was released on Theory and Practice Records of Japan. Later both bands toured Japan together, including dates with Killie, Dipleg, 1000 Travels of Jawaharlal, Enslave, and Endzweck. This split CD showcased Nitro Mega Prayer's expansion of the Japanese screamo sound by incorporating electronic sounds and samples into the intricate mix of caustic screamo.

In March 2006, Nitro Mega Prayer completed on an East Coast tour of the United States with Balboa, and received critical acclaim for their "off the hook" performances. The Japanese only split saw official state-side release by Chicago indie label Forge Again Records.

== Lyrical content and influence ==
Nitro Mega Prayer were influenced by the late 90s early 2000s hardcore/punk bands from Tokyo and Sapporo(Swipe, there is a light that never goes out, Nine Days Wonder, The Sun, Tiala, 100 Lots, Kulara) putting them in the second generation of Japanese bands that had been influenced by the Gravity Records, Dischord (Revolution Summer Era) and Ebulltion Records Sound of the 90's.
