= Project Mercury (album) =

Studio album by Balboa and Rosetta
- Released: April 24, 2007
- Recorded: 2006
- Studios: Jane Doll Studio; Philadelphia, Pennsylvania
- Genres: Post-metal; post-hardcore
- Length: 47:29
- Label: Level Plane
- Producers: BJ McMurtie; J. Matthew Weed

Rosetta chronology
The Galilean Satellites (2005)	Project Mercury (2007)	Wake/Lift (2007)

Balboa chronology
split with Aussitôt Mort (2005)	Project Mercury (2007)	split with Plague Sermon (2010)

Project Mercury is a split album by American heavy metal bands Rosetta and Balboa. It was released on April 24, 2007, through the now-defunct record label Level Plane. The title is derived from the 1959 United States human spaceflight of the same name.

== Reception ==
Professional ratings
Review scores
Source	Rating
Absolute Punk	(85%)
Metal Review	7.9/10 stars
Punknews.org	3.5/5 stars
Scene Point Blank	4/5 stars

Michael of Scene Point Blank called the album a "dynamic adventure in music," and gave it four stars out of five. He said, "Balboa and Rosetta both deliver the goods on Project Mercury, but I found the Rosetta tracks to be a bit more deserving of praise." In a review for Punknews.org, Brian Shultz gave the release three and a half stars out of five. He praised Balboa's tracks, calling "Planet of Slums" "some of the most ambitious and emotional hardcore you can find hanging around." He went on to say, "Balboa manage to reinvent themselves a bit with their anguished arts of Envy-like work, and Rosetta offer some prolonged pieces of guitar-heavy ambience. For those who follow the style closely, this should be a hell of a treat." In Jason Jordon's review for Last Rites, he gave the album a 7.9/10 rating. He wrote, "Project Mercury features a...curious partnership between Neur-Isis-inspired [sic] Rosetta and the political, post-hardcore outfit Balboa. Somehow, the marriage flourishes."

== Track listing ==
Project Mercury track listing
No.	Title	Lyrics	Music	Length
1.	"Primitive Accumulation"	Peter Bloom	Balboa	2:52
2.	"Kaddish"	Bloom	Balboa	9:52
3.	"Planet of Slums"	Bloom	Balboa	3:15
4.	"TMA-1"	J. Matthew Weed	Rosetta	10:21
5.	"Clavius"	Weed	Rosetta	12:18
6.	"Project Mercury"	Weed & Bloom	Rosetta & Balboa	8:51
Total length:				47:29

- Vinyl editions do not include the title track, instead ending after "Clavius"

== Personnel ==
Rosetta

- Michael Armine – vocals, samples
- David Grossman – bass
- Bruce McMurtrie Jr. – drums, engineering, mixing
- J. Matthew Weed – guitars, engineering, mixing

Balboa

- Peter Bloom – vocals
- Armando Morales – bass
- Dave Pacifico – guitars
- Drew Juergens – drums

Additional personnel

- Alan Douches – mastering
- Paul Jeffrey – art design
