= Restorations (band) =

American rock band

- Origin: Philadelphia, Pennsylvania, U.S.
- Genres: Alternative rock, punk rock, post-hardcore
- Years active: 2008–present
- Labels: SideOneDummy, Tiny Engines, Paper + Plastic
- Members: Dan Zimmerman; Dave Klyman; Jon Loudon; Jeff Meyers; Brian Pitonak
- Past members: Ben Pierce; Carlin Brown; Mike Drelling

Restorations is an American rock band, based in Philadelphia, Pennsylvania. They formed after the dissolution of Jena Berlin, a post-hardcore band from Philly that featured guitarist/singer Jon Loudon on vocals, guitarist Dave Klyman, and drummer Jeff Meyers. Originally considered to be a "once-a-month/easy-band" with limited touring the band now tours regularly.

The band initially released a 7" with Evil Weevil records featuring the songs "Frankford" and "Of Trees" and then partnered with Paper + Plastick for their Strange Behavior EP release both digitally and on 10" vinyl. After that financial arrangement fell through the band moved on to release their first LP on Tiny Engines. Following this they partnered with SideOneDummy to release LP2 and LP3, both recorded by Jon Low, who has engineered and worked on records for the National, Twin Sister, and others at Miner Street Studio. The band's fourth album, LP5000, was released September 28, 2018 by Tiny Engines.

== Discography ==
Logo

Studio albums

- LP1 (2011)
- LP2 (2013)
- LP3 (2014)
- LP5000 (2018)
- Restorations (2024)

EPs

- Strange Behavior (2010)

Singles and 7 inches

- "See/Sea"
- "Call and Response IV"
- "New/Old"
- "A/B"
- Split with Rosetta
- "Frankford/Of Trees"
