= Wake/Lift =

Studio album by Rosetta
- Released: October 2, 2007
- Recorded: 2007
- Studios: Jane Doll Studio; Philadelphia, Pennsylvania; Menegroth Studios; Queens, New York
- Genres: Post-metal; post-rock; space rock
- Length: 64:41
- Label: Translation Loss
- Producer: Rosetta

Rosetta chronology
Project Mercury (2007)	Wake/Lift (2007)	The Cleansing Undertones of Wake/Lift (2007)

Professional ratings
Review scores
Source	Rating
AbsolutePunk.net	(82%)
AllMusic	4.5/5 stars
Decibel Magazine	(favorable)
Decoy Music	4/5 stars
Music Emissions	3.5/5 stars
Plug in Music	A−
Scene Point Blank	(8/10)
Sonic Frontiers	(9.3/10)
StonerRock.com	(favorable)
Transform Online	(favorable)

Wake/Lift is the second full-length album by post-metal band Rosetta. The CD edition was released on October 2, 2007 through Translation Loss Records, with a limited-edition double LP following in 2008.

== Production and style ==
Wake/Lift is Rosetta's first album to not be entirely engineered by the band. It is also Rosetta's first to be recorded to analog tape. Consequently, the production on Wake/Lift is more refined than the band's previous works.

Guitarist J. Matthew Weed has stated that the band has taken on a more melodic, technical, and experimental sound. Rather than sounding entirely like the metal style of The Galilean Satellites, Wake/Lift falls more into the post-rock genre while retaining space rock and hardcore influences.

Lyrically and thematically, the album deals much less with astronomical concepts and is more influenced by vocalist Mike Armine's experiences as a teacher. He stated,

"This release is more of a social commentary on my first year teaching, and the kids whose lives I've seen destroyed by poor parenting. I seriously believe people should legally need to have a dog for three years before having a child. I've seen my knuckles turn white at some of the things parents do and say to their kids in the name of guilt, denial, power, and neglect."

== Release ==
The band had been performing "Red in Tooth and Claw" at live show as far back as April 2007, months before the album's release. The track "Wake" was posted on the Translation Loss Records Myspace page in a low-quality format on August 17, 2007, and again later on Rosetta's own Myspace page on August 19, 2007.

A component disc, entitled The Cleansing Undertones of Wake/Lift, was released alongside Wake/Lift. It contains a collection of ambient samples used by Armine. The album not meant to be synchronized with Wake/Lift, and Armine "purposely designed The Cleansing Undertones of Wake/Lift to make Wake/Lift sound terrible if played together".

In September 2008, the album was remastered and pressed on 180 gram vinyl. It was released on November 11, 2008 and comes in three limited-edition color combinations.

== Track listing ==
Wake/Lift track listing
No.	Title	Length
1.	"Red in Tooth and Claw"	12:15
2.	"Lift (part 1)"	5:06
3.	"Lift (part 2)"	3:19
4.	"Lift (part 3)"	6:08
5.	"Wake"	9:27
6.	"(Temet Nosce)"	14:56
7.	"Monument"	13:30
Total length:		64:41

Temet nosce is Latin for "know thyself".

== Personnel ==
Rosetta

- Michael Armine – sound manipulation, vocals, engineering
- David Grossman – bass, engineering
- Bruce McMurtrie Jr. – drums, engineering
- J. Matthew Weed – guitar, engineering, mixing

Other personnel

- Colin Marston – engineering, mastering
- Paul Romano – artwork, design
