= Quintessential Ephemera =

Studio album by Rosetta
- Released: June 22, 2015
- Recorded: February 2015
- Studios: Machines With Magnets; Providence, Rhode Island
- Genres: Post-metal; post-hardcore; emo
- Length: 51:14
- Label: self-released
- Producer: Rosetta

Rosetta chronology
Rosetta: Audio/Visual Original Score (2015)	Quintessential Ephemera (2015)	A Dead-Ender's Reunion (2016)

Quintessential Ephemera is fifth studio album by post-metal band Rosetta and their first recording as a five-piece.

== Background ==
In contrast to the darker hardcore influenced sound of The Anaesthete, Quintessential Ephemera saw Rosetta moving into more upbeat and melodic territory, with greater use of clean vocals by Eric Jernigan and David Grossman. The addition of Jernigan as a second guitarist also saw the band experiment more with counterpoint guitar melodies. Guitarist Matt Weed has frequently cited Oceansize as a major influence on the direction of Quintessential Ephemera.

== Track listing ==
Quintessential Ephemera track listing
No.	Title	Length
1.	"After the Funeral"	3:34
2.	"(Untitled I)"	7:06
3.	"(Untitled II)"	4:54
4.	"(Untitled III)"	6:35
5.	"(Untitled IV)"	3:03
6.	"(Untitled V)"	7:04
7.	"(Untitled VI)"	6:03
8.	"(Untitled VII)"	6:30
9.	"Nothing in the Guise of Something"	6:25
Total length:		51:14

Japanese Edition bonus tracks
No.	Title	Length
10.	"Untitled VI (Living Phantoms Remix)"	6:48
11.	"Untitled III (Living Phantoms Remix)"	6:22

== Personnel ==
Rosetta

- Mike Armine – vocals, electronics, production
- Dave Grossman – bass, vocals, production
- Eric Jernigan – guitar, vocals, production
- B.J. McMurtrie – drums, vocals, 'barsista', production
- Matt Weed – guitar, piano, vocals, production

Guest

- Erik Osheim – additional vocals

Production

- Seth Manchester – engineering, mixing
- Keith Souza – engineering, mixing
- Colin Marston – mastering
- Mark Price – graphics, photos, design, layout
