= Flies to Flame =

EP by Rosetta
- Released: October 14, 2014
- Recorded: January–April 2013
- Studios: Jane Doll Studio; Philadelphia, Pennsylvania
- Genre: Post-metal
- Length: 31:34
- Label: Translation Loss

Rosetta chronology
| The Anaesthete (2013) | Flies to Flame (2014) | Rosetta: Audio/Visual Original Score (2015) |

Flies to Flame is the an extended play by post-metal band Rosetta, released in 2014 on Translation Loss Records.

== Track list ==
Flies to Flame track listing
| No. | Title | Length |
|---|---|---|
| 1. | "Soot" | 9:27 |
| 2. | "Seven Years With Nothing To Show" | 4:55 |
| 3. | "Les Mots Et Les Choses" | 9:30 |
| 4. | "Pegasus" | 7:42 |
| Total length: | | 31:34 |

== Personnel ==
Flies to Flame personnel adapted from liner notes.

Rosetta

- Michael Armine – electronics, vocals
- David Grossman – bass, piano
- Bruce McMurtrie Jr. – drums, engineering
- J. Matthew Weed – guitar, bass, mixing

Other personnel

- James Plotkin – mastering
- Mike Wohlberg – artwork, layout
