= LPK-26 =

Chemical compound

Identifiers
- IUPAC name: 2-(3,4-dichlorophenyl)-N-[(2S)-1-(2,5-dihydropyrrol-1-yl)-3-methylbutan-2-yl]-N-methylacetamide
- CAS Number: 492451-07-7
- PubChem CID: 10043746
- ChemSpider: 8219310
- UNII: HTE2K3D35Y
- CompTox Dashboard (EPA): DTXSID501018433
- ECHA InfoCard: 100.161.432

Chemical and physical data
- Formula: C_{18}H_{24}Cl_{2}N_{2}O
- Molar mass: 355.30 g·mol^{−1}
- 3D model (JSmol): Interactive image
- SMILES: CC(C)[C@@H](CN1CC=CC1)N(C)C(=O)CC2=CC(=C(C=C2)Cl)Cl
- InChI: InChI=1S/C18H24Cl2N2O/c1-13(2)17(12-22-8-4-5-9-22)21(3)18(23)11-14-6-7-15(19)16(20)10-14/h4-7,10,13,17H,8-9,11-12H2,1-3H3/t17-/m1/s1; Key:QFAIAMMFKKYCTL-QGZVFWFLSA-N

LPK-26 is a potent and selective κ-opioid agonist, and has analgesic effects.

== See also ==
- U-50488
