= Rosetta (band) =

American post-metal band

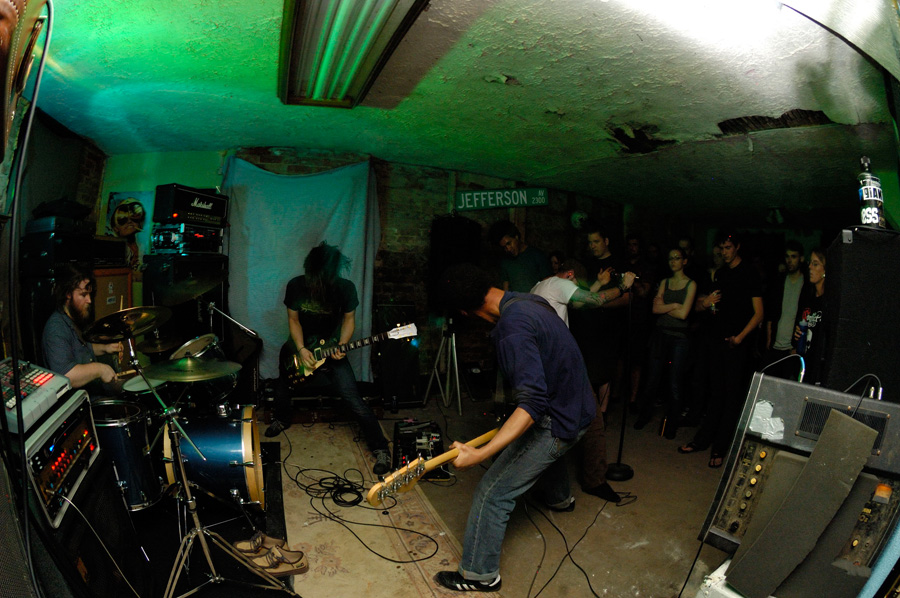
- Rosetta performing in Richmond, Virginia in 2008

Background information
- Origin: Philadelphia, Pennsylvania, U.S.
- Genres: Post-metal; sludge metal; space rock; post-rock; ambient
- Years active: 2003–present
- Labels: Pelagic; Arcane Angels; Tokyo Jupiter; War Crime; Cavity; Translation Loss
- Members: Michael Armine; David Grossman; Bruce McMurtrie Jr.; James Matthew Weed; Eric Jernigan
- Website: www.rosettaband.com (archived)

Rosetta is an American post-metal band from Philadelphia, Pennsylvania that has been active since 2003.

== History ==
Rosetta was founded in Philadelphia, Pennsylvania by vocalist Michael Armine, bassist David Grossman, drummer Bruce McMurtrie Jr., and guitarist James Matthew Weed. The four were acquaintances in high school and had played in various bands. Their name does not come from the Rosetta Stone, but was chosen because they "wanted a one word name that was both feminine and beautiful." The group had their first rehearsal on June 15, 2003, in the youth room of a stone church sanctuary outside Philadelphia. After only three practice sessions, they performed a last minute gig on August 20, 2003, improvising the entire show. Rosetta wrote and recorded a four-song demo album, which picked up interest from Translation Loss Records.

Their debut studio album, The Galilean Satellites, featured two separate hour-long discs (one of metal-oriented music, and one of ambience) that synchronize together. This setup was inspired by the Neurosis album Times of Grace. Although originally intended to be one disc of metal tracks sandwiched by ambient ones, the band had enough material to cover two discs. The album was released on October 18, 2005, through Translation Loss. Rosetta self-released a CD-R and a 5.1 surround sound DVD-R during the band's 2005 and 2006 tours, respectively. These both played a synchronized mix of The Galilean Satellites.

The band's second proper release was a split album with Balboa titled Project Mercury. It was released April 24, 2007 by Level Plane Records. After a tour of the United States, the band's second full-length album, Wake/Lift, was released on October 2 through Translation Loss. The release of Wake/Lift was accompanied by an ambient album, The Cleansing Undertones of Wake/Lift, which came out the same day. To support the new records, Rosetta toured the United States before embarking on a June 2008 tour of Australia.

Rosetta contributed a cover version of The Cure song "Homesick" on a split album with Year of No Light and East of the Wall. The band's third studio album, A Determinism of Morality, was released by Translation Loss on May 25, 2010. Rosetta supported the album with their first full tour of the US in three years. In September, the band released a split LP with Restorations via Cavity Records, featuring a previously unreleased track which had been recorded in December 2007. A split EP with Junius followed in 2011.

In 2012, Rosetta announced their return to Europe in the summer, followed by their second Australia tour. The tour was accompanied by a split release with touring partners City of Ships, released by Australian independent label Bird's Robe Records. After a decade on Translation Loss, Rosetta became a fully independent band in 2013. They self-released their fourth studio album, The Anaesthete, that same year. Guitarist and vocalist Eric Jernigan, who contributed guest vocals to the band's previous two albums, became an official member of Rosetta in 2014. Their final release on Translation Loss was the Flies to Flame EP on October 14. A documentary film by Justin Jackson titled Rosetta: Audio/Visual was released on Christmas Day 2014. The following year, they released the film's soundtrack, Rosetta: Audio/Visual Original Score, which was followed by their fifth studio album, Quintessential Ephemera.

Rosetta released a compilation album titled A Dead-Ender's Reunion in 2016. It contained remixes, rarities, B-sides, and retrospectives spanning the band's career. In 2017, Rosetta released its sixth studio album, Utopioid, and headlined a North American tour supported by sludge band North. After more shows in Southeast Asia, Australia, and New Zealand, they embarked on a 2018 European tour alongside The Ocean and Årabrot. Two EPs, Sower of Wind and Terra Sola, were released in 2019, as was a split with Labirinto and La Bestia de Gévaudan. In July 2023, the band embarked on a brief US tour with SOM. In September 2026, Rosetta announced their seventh studio album, Temporal Lapse, which is expected to be their last.

== Musical style ==
Rosetta plays a style of post-metal that incorporates elements of space rock, sludge, post-hardcore, shoegaze, drone, post-rock, avant-garde and ambient. The band's influences are diverse and include acts such as Neurosis, Isis, My Bloody Valentine, Frodus, and Stars of the Lid. Rosetta's members have an interest in astronomy and space travel, and they somewhat humorously describe their music as "metal for astronauts".

== Members ==
Current members

- Michael Armine – lead vocals, keyboards, synthesizers, samples, effects (2003–present)
- David Grossman – bass guitar, piano, backing vocals (2003–present)
- Bruce McMurtrie Jr. – drums, percussion, backing vocals (2003–present)
- James Matthew Weed – guitar, violin, piano, bass guitar, backing vocals (2003–present)
- Eric Jernigan – guitar, keyboards, piano, synthesizers, backing vocals (2014–present)

Session/touring

- Will Benoit – bass guitar (2018)

== Discography ==
Studio albums

- The Galilean Satellites (Translation Loss, 2005)
- Wake/Lift (Translation Loss, 2007)
- A Determinism of Morality (Translation Loss, 2010)
- The Anaesthete (self-released, 2013)
- Quintessential Ephemera (self-released, 2015)
- Utopioid (self-released, 2017)
- Temporal Lapse (Pelagic, 2026)

Soundtracks

- Rosetta: Audio/Visual Original Score (self-released, 2015)

Compilations

- A Dead-Ender's Reunion (self-released, 2016)

Extended plays

- Demo (self-released, 2004)
- The Cleansing Undertones of Wake/Lift (Translation Loss, 2007)
- Flies to Flame (Translation Loss, 2014)
- Rosetta on Audiotree Live (Audiotree Music, 2018)
- Sower of Wind (self-released, 2019)
- Terra Sola (self-released, 2019)

Split releases

- Project Mercury with Balboa (Level Plane, 2007)
- split with Year of No Light and East of the Wall (Translation Loss, 2009)
- split with Restorations (Cavity, 2010)
- Junius / Rosetta with Junius (Translation Loss, 2011)
- split with City of Ships (Bird's Robe, 2012)
- split with Labirinto and La Bestia de Gévaudan (Kali Yuga Distro, 2019)

DVDs

- The Galilean Satellites 5.1 (self-released, 2006)
- Rosetta: Audio/Visual (Fly Jar Films, 2015)

Other appearances

- "Rain Falling on a Factory Roof (Redux)" on The Silent Ballet Volume XV (Lost Children Net, 2010)
- "In Limbs and Joints (Rosetta Remix)" on ...And Then They Remixed Everything (Bird's Robe, 2013)
- "Like I Care" (Helmet cover) on Meantime [Redux] (Magnetic Eye, 2016)
