= Rosetta: Audio/Visual Original Score =

Soundtrack album by Rosetta
- Released: January 6, 2015
- Recorded: August–November 2014
- Studios: Mount Zion; Philadelphia, Pennsylvania
- Genres: Post-rock; Ambient
- Length: 56:51
- Label: self-released
- Producer: Rosetta

Rosetta chronology
Flies to Flame (2014)	Rosetta: Audio/Visual Original Score (2015)	Quintessential Ephemera (2015)

Rosetta: Audio/Visual Original Score is the original score for Justin Jackson's documentary film, Rosetta: Audio/Visual.

== Release ==
In January 2015, Rosetta: Audio/Visual Original Score was self-released to Bandcamp using the pay what you want pricing system. The following year, Greek record label Arcane Angels distributed a limited CD pressing of the album.

== Track listing ==
1. "Dunes" – 7:24
2. "Talus" – 1:13
3. "Stoma" – 2:07
4. "Tape A" – 3:49
5. "Lagoons" – 5:21
6. "Waves" – 8:59
7. "Alterne" – 3:18
8. "Estuary" – 4:34
9. "Bergmann's Rule" – 4:46
10. "Sedges" – 8:12
11. "Tape B" – 2:30
12. "Maritimes" – 4:38

== Personnel ==
Rosetta: Audio/Visual Original Score personnel adapted from liner notes.

Performers

- Mike Armine – electronics, samples
- Matt Weed – guitars, bass, tape manipulation, mixing, mastering
- Linshuang Lu – piano

Art design

- Mike Wohlberg – artwork, layout
- Semitone Labs – layout design
