= A Dead-Ender's Reunion =

Compilation album by Rosetta
- Released: January 12, 2016
- Recorded: 2003–2015
- Genres: Post-metal; Post-rock; ambient
- Length: 72:05; 189:45 (with bonus tracks)
- Label: self-released
- Producer: Rosetta

Rosetta chronology
Quintessential Ephemera (2015)	A Dead-Ender's Reunion (2016)	Utopioid (2017)

A Dead-Ender's Reunion is a compilation album by post-metal band Rosetta, and their fourth fully independent release.

== Release ==
A Dead-Ender's Reunion was announced on Rosetta's blog on October 19, 2015 and self-released as a download via Bandcamp on January 12, 2016 using the pay what you want pricing system. Although ten tracks are listed, the album comes as a ZIP file with 23 tracks, two live videos, and a torrent file to download an ISO image of a previously released DVD titled The Galilean Satellites 5.1.

In 2016, the first ten tracks were released on CD by Greek record label Arcane Angels. In 2018, the label released a limited edition box set titled A Dead-Ender's Reunion: The Definite Collection. The set features all 23 tracks and includes a CD, two cassette tapes, a booklet, and photos, all housed inside a wooden box.

== Track listing ==
A Dead-Ender's Reunion track listing

1. "Back to Where You Began" – 5:54
2. "(Untitled VI) [Living Phantoms remix]" – 6:48
3. "Rain Falling on a Factory Roof [Redux]" – 9:54
4. "(Untitled III) [Living Phantoms remix]" – 6:23
5. "Red in Tooth and Claw [SP808 remix]" – 7:39
6. "The Nomad" – 5:01
7. "Hodoku [Living Phantoms remix]" – 5:28
8. "The Order of Things" - 5:27
9. "Oku [Living Phantoms remix]" – 6:04
10. "Au Pays Natal [2005 Acoustic]" – 13:27

Bonus tracks

1. "Renew (Quiet) [live]" - 8:03
2. "Ryu / Tradition (Quiet) [live]" - 9:50
3. "Départe [2003 demo]" - 7:36
4. "Europa [2003 demo]" - 10:51
5. "Noise2 (The Tide) [2003 Demo]" - 9:58
6. "Song1 [2003 demo]" - 5:32
7. "Ryu / Tradition [demo]" - 10:23
8. "Myo / The Miraculous [demo]" - 3:03
9. "Lift [Fall 2005 demo]" - 13:00
10. "Clavius [Fall 2005 demo]" - 12:09
11. "Red in Tooth and Claw [Fall 2005 demo]" - 12:37
12. "Je N'en Connais Pas la Fin [Summer 2009 demo]" - 5:38
13. "A Determinism of Morality [Summer 2009 demo]" - 9:00
