= Balboa (band) =

- Origin: Philadelphia, United States
- Genres: Hardcore; Post-metal screamo
- Years active: –November 2008
- Labels: Forge Again; Level Plane
- Website: balboacore.com

Balboa is an American hardcore band, from Philadelphia, United States.

== Discography ==
=== Studio releases ===
- Balboa LP (2003, Word Salad Records)
- Balboa CD (2004 re-release, Forge Again Records)
- Manifeste Canibale EP (2005, Forge Again Records)

=== Compilations ===
- A Vision to Be Heard (2004, "Closer than Breathing", "Letters on a Regicide Peace")
- The Way (2004, "Colorguard/Translucent")

=== Splits ===
- with Nitro Mega Prayer 7" (2005, Forge Again Records)
- with Aussitot Mort 7" (Forge Again Records)
- Project Mercury with Rosetta LP (Level Plane Records)
- with Plague Sermon LP (2010, Magic Bullet Records & Midmarch Records)

== Members ==
=== Current members ===
- Peter Bloom – vocals
- Armando Morales – bass guitar
- Dave Pacifico – guitar
- Drew Juergens – drums

=== Former members ===
- Michael Saretsky – guitar (2000–2004)
- John Wanner – drums (2000–2001)
- Charlie Askew – bass (2000–2001)
