= Junius (band) =

American rock band

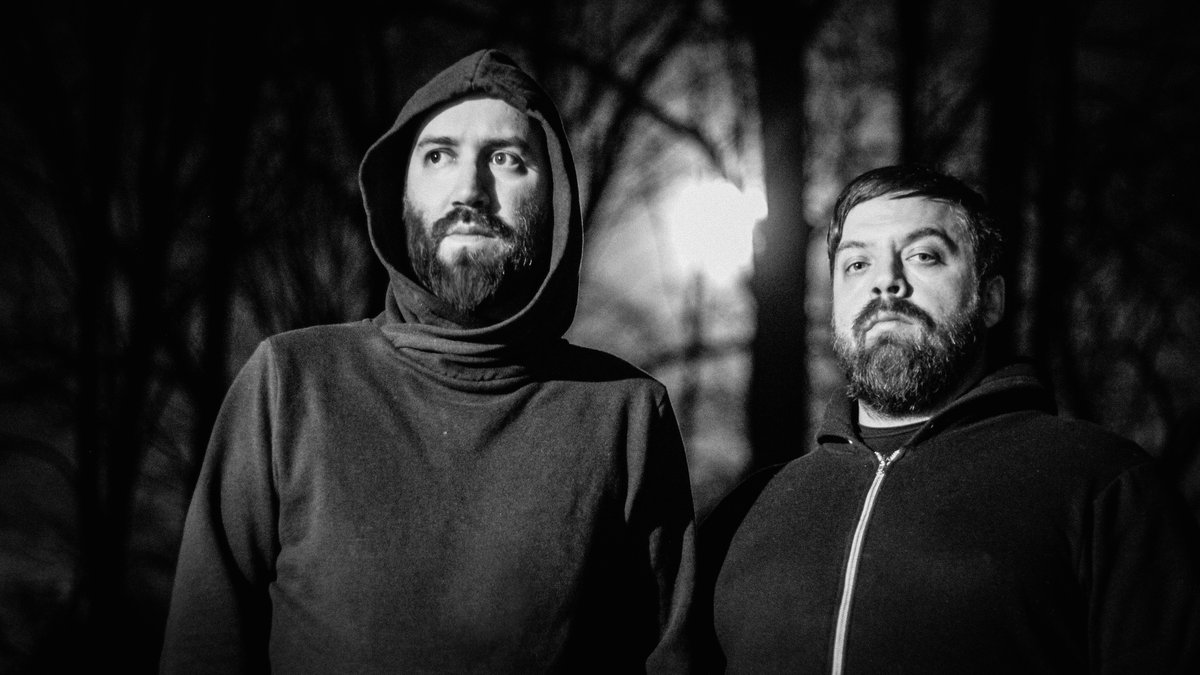
- Joseph E. Martinez and Dana Filloon of Junius in 2017

Background information
- Origin: Boston, Massachusetts, U.S.
- Genres: Post-metal; metalgaze; space rock; art rock
- Years active: 2003–present
- Labels: Prosthetic; Pelagic Records; Make My Day; Radar Recordings
- Members: Joseph E. Martinez; Dana Filloon; Orion Wainer; Eoghan McCarthy; Matthew Vincenty
- Past members: Michael Repasch-Nieves; Ira Bronson; Keiffer Infantino; Dave Soucy; Joel Munguia
- Website: www.juniusmusic.com

Junius is an American rock band from Boston, Massachusetts that was formed in 2003. The band is composed of lead vocalist and guitarist Joseph E. Martinez, and drummer Dana Filloon. Thus far, they have released four EPs and three full-length albums. The band name is taken after Junius, the pseudonym of a political writer who lived during the late 18th century.

== History ==
=== Formation and first years (2003–2008) ===
Junius's first releases were two EPs on Radar Recordings, Forcing Out the Silence (2004) and Blood is Bright(2006). In 2007, they reissued the EPs on a single self-titled CD. This album was also released on Radar Recordings. During this time, the group cycled through several bass players before finding a permanent bass player, Joel Munguia, who is first credited on the band's third EP The Fires of Antediluvia which was released in May 2007.

=== The Martyrdom of a Catastrophist (2009–2011) ===
Their first proper full-length, The Martyrdom of a Catastrophist, was released on November 10, 2009 through the label The Mylene Sheath in the US and Make My Day Records in Europe. The album is inspired by the writings of theorist Immanuel Velikovsky and took the group nearly three years to complete. Junius produced The Martyrdom of a Catastrophist at the legendary A&M Records studios in Hollywood (now known as Henson Recording Studios) over the course of a year, somewhat guerilla-style, during off-hours when the studio wasn't booked (the band has joked that they were bumped out by everyone from Akon to Bruce Springsteen—literally). The album was recorded by Kevin Mills and Tom Syrowski (Weezer, AFI) and mastered by Dave Collins (Danny Elfman, Black Sabbath). It also includes a 24-page book featuring art by Drew Speziale (Circle Takes the Square) and illustrator Matt Gauck. On May 20, 2011, it was announced that Junius would be covering the song "Firehead" by Hum. The song was included on the tribute cover album Songs of Farewell and Departure: A Tribute To HUM, which was released on September 6, 2011. Junius released a split EP with the band Rosetta which contained the track "A Day Dark with Night" on September 27, 2011.

=== Reports from the Threshold of Death (2011–2014) ===
Betray the Grave (official music video)

On October 25, 2011, Junius released their second full-length titled Reports from the Threshold of Death. It was released and distributed via Prosthetic Records. In support of Reports upcoming release, Junius replaced Ghost on the 2011 Enslaved (band)/Alcest tour. In 2012 following Reports release, Junius toured across Europe, Scandinavia, and the UK with Katatonia and Alcest hitting 20+ countries. Junius released their first music video for the track "All Shall Float" which debuted on Alternative Press on February 4, 2012. And on April 10, 2012, Junius debuted their second music video for the track "Betray the Grave" on Noisecreep. In an interview with Blistering, the band stated that the follow-up to Reports from the Threshold of Death is currently in its "conceptual stages", and that they wish to continue to tour throughout 2012. After completing their 2013 North America tour, the band set to work on completing a new EP. It was announced on their official website that the EP would be title Days of the Fallen Sun and that it would be released on February 18, 2014 through Prosthetic Records. According to Repasch-Nieves, the band has begun the writing process for their third full-length studio album with the hope of a late 2014 release.

=== Eternal Rituals for the Accretion of Light (2017–present) ===
On March 3, 2017, Junius released their third full-length album titled Eternal Rituals for the Accretion of Light. It was released and distributed via Prosthetic Records. Prior to the full release, three new Music Videos were uploaded; the release and album tour was announced with Junius' second music video on January 27, 2017, "The Queen's Constellation." Junius' third video "Clean the Beast" was released on February 14, 2017, and the final video, "A Mass for Metaphysicians" was released on February 28, 2017.

Martinez wrote all of the songs on his own before working them out in the studio with Filloon on drums; this album also features guests like Drew Speziale of Circle Takes the Square, who provides alternately soft and screamy backing vocals on several tracks. Eternal Rituals is based around Initiation, the semi-autobiography of Hungarian mystic, yoga practitioner and reincarnation expert Elisabeth Haich. Martinez used the book as a rough blueprint to tell the story of a soul's "path to transcendence," beginning with an initiation and ending with the total obliteration of self—a lift-off into ego-death. The album is the band's heaviest to date, full of chugging guitars and whooshing synths that climaxes with "Black Sarcophagus," their prog-doom thesis statement. "It's just another hero's journey through self-awareness, determination, struggle, humility, pain, suffering, passion, love, telepathy, and ultimately transcendence to GOD-MAN status," says Martinez.

== Discography ==
Studio albums

- The Martyrdom of a Catastrophist (2009)
- Reports from the Threshold of Death (2011)
- Eternal Rituals for the Accretion of Light (2017)
- Sotera (2026)

Extended plays

- Forcing Out the Silence (2004)
- Blood is Bright (2006)
- The Fires of Antediluvia (2007)
- Junius / Juarez (Split release with Juarez) (2010)
- Junius / Rosetta (Split release with Rosetta) (2011)
- Days of the Fallen Sun (2014)

Compilation album

- Junius (2007)

== Members ==
Current members

- Joseph E. Martinez – vocals, lyrics, guitar, synths (2003–present)
- Dana Filloon – drums (2003–present)
- Orion Wainer - Bass (2020–present)
- Eoghan McCarthy - Guitar (2022–present)
- Matthew Vincenty - Guitar (2022–present)

Past members

- Michael Repasch-Nieves – guitar (2003–2015)
- Joel Munguia – bass (2006–2018)
- Ira Bronson – bass (2006)
- Keiffer Infantino – bass (2004–2006)
- Dave Soucy – bass (2004)
- Will Benoit – bass (2003–2004)

Touring members

- Drew Speziale – guitar (2016–2020)
- Justin Forrest Trujillo – drums (2012–2020)
