= Utopioid (album) =

Studio album by Rosetta
- Released: September 1, 2017
- Recorded: July–August 2017
- Studios: Studio G Brooklyn, New York
- Genres: Post-metal; post-rock; experimental metal
- Length: 62:17
- Label: Self-released
- Producers: Francisco Botero; Rosetta

Rosetta chronology
A Dead-Ender's Reunion (2016)	Utopioid (2017)	Temporal Lapse (2026)

Utopioid is the sixth studio album by post-metal band Rosetta. It was self-released to Bandcamp in 2017. Physical editions were released by Pelagic Records and Hidden Deity Records.

== Reception ==
Professional ratings
Review scores
Source	Rating
Hysteria Magazine	8/10

Hysteria Magazine critic Alasdair Belling gave Utopioid an 8 out of 10 rating, calling it "one of the strongest releases for the [post-metal] genre this year." He went on to say, "Throughout the course of listening to Utopioid, it’s obvious that Rosetta have produced a magnificent addition to the increasingly expanding world of experimental metal." In a review for Can This Even Be Called Music, Matt Matheson said, "guitarist and vocalist Eric Jernigan... brought a tasteful degree of post-hardcore/emo influence into their stark sound for their fifth album 2015’s Quintessential Ephemera. On Utopioid, Rosetta has proudly stated that the composition process was more balanced and communal than ever before, and it shows."

== Track listing ==
Utopioid track listing
No.	Title	Length
1.	"Amnion"	4:11
2.	"Intrapartum"	7:50
3.	"Neophyte Visionary"	6:33
4.	"King Ivory Tower"	8:12
5.	"54543"	4:10
6.	"Détente"	7:20
7.	"Hypnagogic"	9:03
8.	"Qohelet"	7:05
9.	"Intramortem"	7:53
Total length:		62:17

Japanese Edition bonus tracks
No.	Title	Length
10.	"Détente (Quiet)"	6:50
11.	"Alternate Ending"	4:10

== Personnel ==
Rosetta

- Mike Armine – vocals, electronics, production
- Dave Grossman – bass, vocals, production
- Eric Jernigan – guitars, vocals, keyboards, production
- Bruce McMurtrie Jr. – drums, percussion, vocals, production
- Matt Weed – guitars, vocals, keyboards, production

Other personnel

- Francisco Botero – production, engineering, mixing
- Alexis Berthelot – engineering
- Carl Saff – mastering
- Jordan Butcher – art direction, design
