= Junius / Rosetta =

- Cover Artwork by Mike Wohlberg

EP by Junius and Rosetta
- Released: September 27, 2011
- Recorded: March 2011
- Studios: Radar Studios; Clinton, Connecticut; Translator Audio; Brooklyn, New York
- Genres: Art rock; space rock; post metal; shoegaze
- Length: 17:59; 28:12 (with bonus tracks)
- Labels: Translation Loss (TL57-2); The Mylene Sheath (Sheath035)

Junius chronology
Junius / Juarez (2010)	Junius / Rosetta (2011)	Reports from the Threshold of Death (2011)

Rosetta chronology
A Determinism of Morality (2010)	Junius / Rosetta (2011)	The Anaesthete (2013)

Professional ratings
Review scores
Source	Rating
Alternative Press	4/5 stars
Sputnikmusic	4/5 stars
Stereokiller	(4.2/5)
About.com	3.5/5 stars
Blistering	8/10 stars
Exclaim!	(favorable)
Muzik Dizcovery	(favorable)
meatmeadmetal	(favorable)
Popblerd!	(favorable)
Metal Army America	(A)

Junius / Rosetta is a split EP by American art rock band Junius and American post metal band Rosetta. It includes original tracks by both bands and a download card to obtain additional content online, including two cover songs.

== Kickstarter ==
Funding for studio time and mixing of the tracks "TMA-3" and "4th of July" was made possible by fan donations through Kickstarter. Rosetta was highly successful in raising $2,611 through this project after a series of setbacks threatened to delay the split release further.

== Release ==
After several years of planning, Junius / Rosetta was made available in CD format on September 27, 2011, and in vinyl format on November 22, 2011. The CD release was handled by Translation Loss Records, while the vinyl edition was by The Mylene Sheath. The vinyl release was limited, and only 1,000 copies have been pressed for distribution.

== Track listing ==
Junius / Rosetta track listing
No.	Title	Music	Writer(s)	Length
1.	"A Day Dark With Night"	Junius	Junius	8:05
2.	"TMA-3"	Rosetta	Rosetta	9:54

Digital bonus tracks
No.	Title	Music	Original artist	Length
3.	"Firehead"	Junius	Hum	3:36
4.	"4th of July"	Rosetta	Soundgarden	6:37

== Personnel ==
Junius

- Joseph E. Martinez – vocals, lyrics, guitar, synths
- Michael Repasch-Nieves – guitar
- Joel Munguia – bass
- Dana Filloon – drums

Rosetta

- Michael Armine – sound manipulation, vocals
- David Grossman – bass guitar, vocals
- Bruce McMurtrie Jr. – drums
- J. Matthew Weed – electric guitar, violin

Production

- Andrew Schneider – recording ("TMA-3" and "4th of July")
- Nick Zampiello – mastering
- Rob Gonnella – mastering
- Mike Wahlberg – artwork
