= HZ-2 =

Chemical compound

Identifiers
- IUPAC name: Dimethyl 3,7-dimethyl-9-oxo-2,4-dipyridin-2-yl-3,7-diazabicyclo[3.3.1]nonane-1,5-dicarboxylate
- CAS Number: 253304-60-8
- PubChem CID: 356604
- ChemSpider: 316554
- ChEMBL: ChEMBL177284
- CompTox Dashboard (EPA): DTXSID90326741

Chemical and physical data
- Formula: C_{23}H_{26}N_{4}O_{5}
- Molar mass: 438.484 g·mol^{−1}
- 3D model (JSmol): Interactive image
- SMILES: n3ccccc3C(N1C)C2(C(=O)OC)CN(C)CC(C2=O)(C(=O)OC)C1c4ccccn4
- InChI: InChI=1S/C23H26N4O5/c1-26-13-22(20(29)31-3)17(15-9-5-7-11-24-15)27(2)18(16-10-6-8-12-25-16)23(14-26,19(22)28)21(30)32-4/h5-12,17-18H,13-14H2,1-4H3; Key:NXOACBKUEYYEQP-UHFFFAOYSA-N

HZ-2 is a drug which acts as a highly selective κ-opioid receptor agonist. It is a potent analgesic with around the same potency as morphine, with a long duration of action and high oral bioavailability. Side effects include sedation, nausea and dysphoria as well as diuretic effects.

== See also ==
- CL 110,393
- Salvinorin B methoxymethyl ether
