= The Cleansing Undertones of Wake/Lift =

EP by Rosetta
- Released: October 2, 2007
- Genres: Ambient; noise; dark ambient
- Length: 41:39
- Label: Translation Loss
- Producers: Michael Armine; BJ McMurtie

Rosetta chronology
Wake/Lift (2007)	The Cleansing Undertones of Wake/Lift (2007)	A Determinism of Morality (2010)

The Cleansing Undertones of Wake/Lift is a companion EP to the full-length album Wake/Lift by post-metal band Rosetta. It was released in 2007 on Translation Loss Records.

== Background ==
The Cleansing Undertones of Wake/Lift is made from various noise samples compiled by Rosetta vocalist Michael Armine between the years 2000 and 2007. While it contains samples used in Wake/Lift, the two albums are not meant to be synchronized. Armine "purposely designed The Cleansing Undertones of Wake/Lift to make Wake/Lift sound terrible if played together."

In 2012, Translation Loss released a double CD featuring all four tracks from Cleansing Undertones along with Verse, another ambient album by Armine.

== Track list ==
The Cleansing Undertones of Wake/Lift track listing
No.	Title	Length
1.	"Untitled 1"	11:32
2.	"Untitled 2"	9:27
3.	"Untitled 3"	10:34
4.	"Untitled 4"	10:06
Total length:		41:39

== Personnel ==
The Cleansing Undertones of Wake/Lift personnel adapted from liner notes.

Production

- Michael Armin – vocals, lyrics, samples, effects, recording
- BJ McMurtie – recording

Artwork

- Jessie Yanniell – artwork
- Adam Wentworth – design
