= Eternal Rituals for the Accretion of Light =

- Artwork, Layout and Design by Drew Speziale

Studio album by Junius
- Released: March 3, 2017
- Studio: Will Benoit's Radar Studios, Clinton, CT
- Genre: Art rock; post-metal; alternative metal; space rock; post-punk
- Length: 45:29
- Label: Prosthetic
- Producer: Will Benoit

Junius chronology
Days of the Fallen Sun (2014)	Eternal Rituals for the Accretion of Light (2017)	Sotera (2026)

Eternal Rituals for the Accretion of Light is the third full-length studio album from American art rock band Junius. The record was released in CD, limited edition Vinyl, and digital download format through Prosthetic Records on March 3, 2017.

== Background ==
After the departures of long time guitarist Michael Repasch-Nieves and bassist Joel Munguia Reynolds, Joseph E. Martinez wrote and recorded the album in 15 months with founding member Dana Filloon on drums. Additional vocals and lyrics on "A Mass for Metaphysicians" and "Clean the Beast" by Drew Speziale (of Circle Takes the Square). Joel Munguia Reynolds has since returned to the band as their touring bass player.

== Theme ==
Junius' 2011 LP Reports from the Threshold of Death explored the soul's journey after death and with Eternal Rituals for the Accretion of Light the soul reincarnates and tries to break free of Samsara. The album's 10 tracks serve as a guide for the Initiate to reach transcendence. It also completes their trilogy of albums starting with The Martyrdom of a Catastrophist, Reports from the Threshold of Death and ending with Eternal Rituals for the Accretion of Light.

== Reception ==
Eternal Rituals of the Accretion Light received generally positive reviews from critics. Revolver Magazine lists "Clean the Beast" as one of their top 50 songs of 2017. Received Album of the year from Rock and Roll Fables. No. 8 album in 2017 from Vancouver Weekly. It was No. 3 on Excretakano of Metal Sucks top albums of 2017. Album of the Year from Godless and No. 3 from Chuck of The Metal Podcast.

== Track listing ==
All tracks are written by Junius.

No.	Title	Length
1.	"March of the Samsara"	5:34
2.	"Beyond the Pale Society"	5:25
3.	"A Mass for Metaphysicians"	5:51
4.	"Clean the Beast"	4:28
5.	"All that is, is of the One"	0:59
6.	"The Queen's Constellation"	5:41
7.	"Telepaths & Pyramids"	4:40
8.	"Masquerade in Veils"	3:17
9.	"Heresy of the Free Spirit"	3:19
10.	"Black Sarcophagus"	6:15
Total length:		45:29

== Personnel ==
Eternal Rituals for the Accretion of Light album personnel adapted from the CD liner notes

Junius

- Joseph E. Martinez – vocals, lyrics, guitar, bass, synths
- Dana Filloon – drums, Auxiliary percussion
- Drew Speziale – additional vocals & lyrics on "A Mass for Metaphysicians" and "Clean the Beast"

Production

- Junius & Will Benoit – production
- Will Benoit – mixing & mastering
- Daryl Rabidoux – engineering
- Recorded at Radar Studios in Clinton, CT

Art

- Drew Speziale (of Circle Takes the Square) – Album artwork, design, and layout
