= Bromadoline =

Opioid analgesic drug

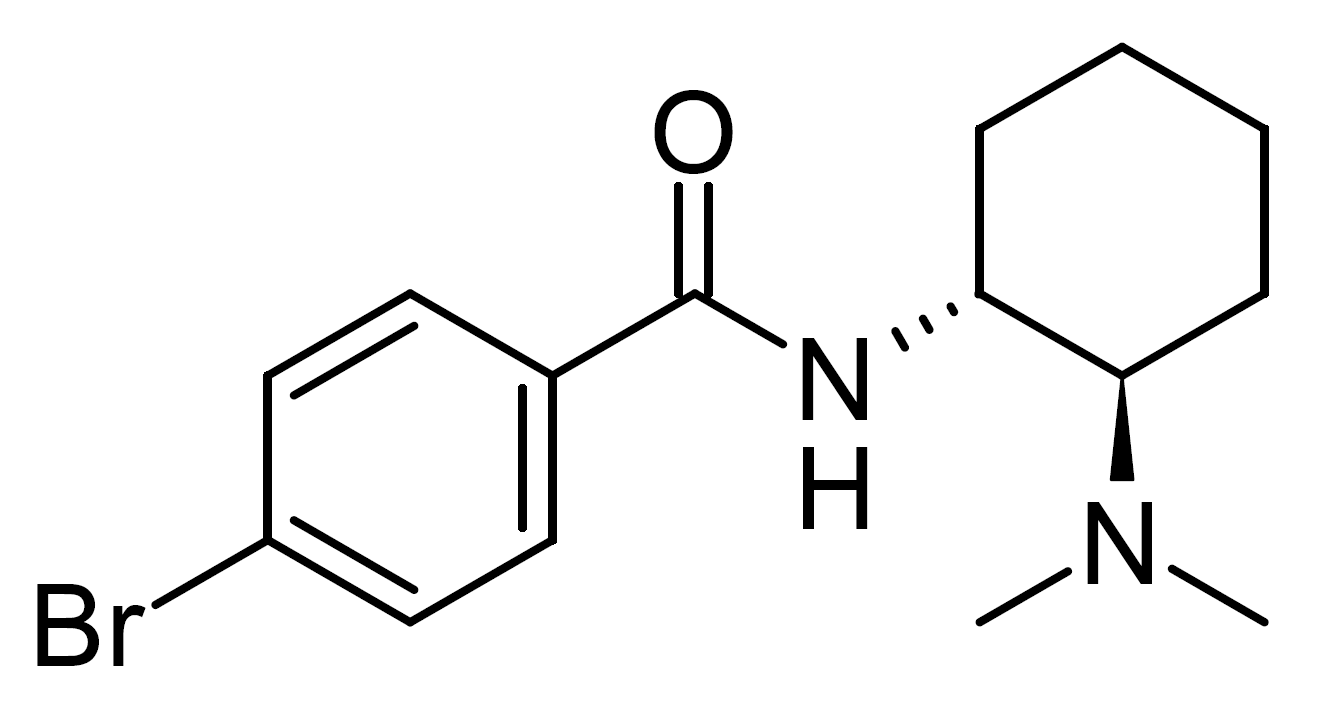

Clinical data
- Other names: Bromadoline
- ATC code: none

Identifiers
- IUPAC name: 4-bromo-N-[(1R,2R)-2-(dimethylamino)cyclohexyl]benzamide
- CAS Number: 2418521-61-4 67579-24-2 (mixture of trans isomers)
- PubChem CID: 6328449
- ChemSpider: 4886584
- UNII: R8DWN01P1M
- CompTox Dashboard (EPA): DTXSID40217897

Chemical and physical data
- Formula: C_{15}H_{21}BrN_{2}O
- Molar mass: 325.250 g·mol^{−1}
- 3D model (JSmol): Interactive image
- SMILES: CN(C)[C@@H]1CCCC[C@H]1NC(=O)C2=CC=C(C=C2)Br
- InChI: InChI=1S/C15H21BrN2O/c1-18(2)14-6-4-3-5-13(14)17-15(19)11-7-9-12(16)10-8-11/h7-10,13-14H,3-6H2,1-2H3,(H,17,19)/t13-,14-/m1/s1; Key:UFDJFJYMMIZKLG-ZIAGYGMSSA-N

Bromadoline (U-47931E) is an opioid analgesic selective for the μ-opioid receptor developed by the Upjohn company in the 1970s. The drug has a potency lying between that of codeine and morphine, being slightly stronger than pentazocine. Bromadoline is related to AH-7921 and U-47700.

== See also ==
- AH-7921
- U-47700
- Spiradoline
- U-50488
