= GR-89696 =

Chemical compound

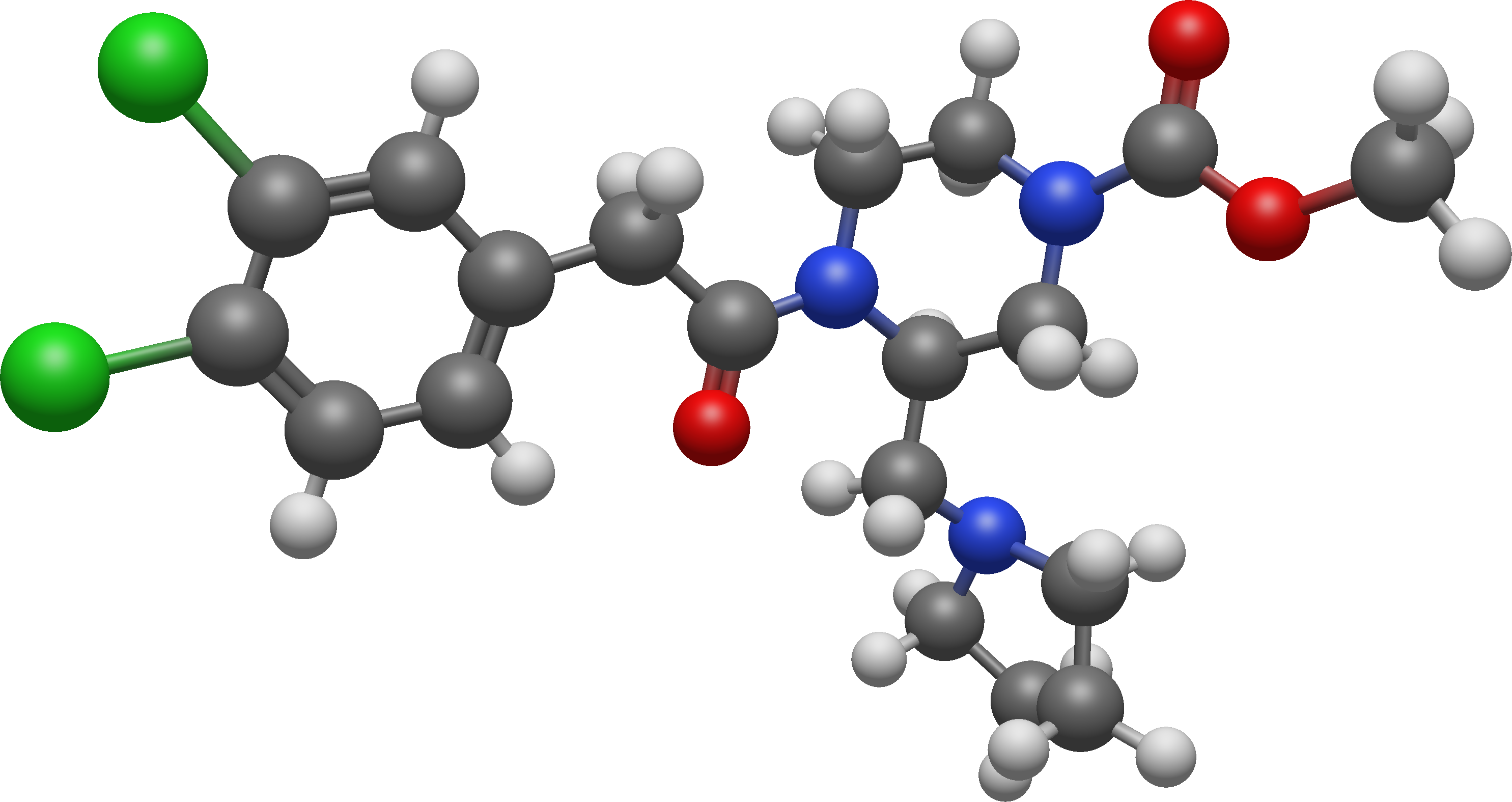

Identifiers
- IUPAC name: methyl 4-[2-(3,4-dichlorophenyl)acetyl]-3-(pyrrolidin-1-ylmethyl)piperazine-1-carboxylate
- CAS Number: 126766-32-3
- PubChem CID: 3505
- IUPHAR/BPS: 1649
- ChemSpider: 3385
- UNII: YDF52K5SDR
- ChEMBL: ChEMBL277863
- PDB ligand: U9I (PDBe, RCSB PDB)
- CompTox Dashboard (EPA): DTXSID50875164

Chemical and physical data
- Formula: C_{19}H_{25}Cl_{2}N_{3}O_{3}
- Molar mass: 414.33 g·mol^{−1}
- 3D model (JSmol): Interactive image
- SMILES: Clc1ccc(cc1Cl)CC(=O)N2CCN(C(=O)OC)CC2CN3CCCC3
- InChI: InChI=1S/C19H25Cl2N3O3/c1-27-19(26)23-8-9-24(15(13-23)12-22-6-2-3-7-22)18(25)11-14-4-5-16(20)17(21)10-14/h4-5,10,15H,2-3,6-9,11-13H2,1H3; Key:HJUAKZYKCANOOZ-UHFFFAOYSA-N

GR-89696 is a drug which acts as a highly selective κ-opioid agonist. It has been studied in various animal species, and has been described as selective for the κ_{2} subtype. Recent studies have suggested that GR-89696 and related κ_{2}-selective agonists may be useful for preventing the itching which is a common side effect of conventional opioid analgesic drugs, without the additional side effects of non-selective kappa agonists. The structure bound to the κ-opioid receptor has been reported.
