= The Anaesthete =

Studio album by Rosetta
- Released: August 8, 2013
- Recorded: July 2013
- Studios: Studio G Brooklyn, New York
- Genres: Post-rock; post-metal; sludge metal; doom metal
- Length: 58:42
- Label: self-released
- Producers: Andrew Schneider; Rosetta

Rosetta chronology
Junius / Rosetta (2011)	The Anaesthete (2013)	Flies to Flame (2014)

The Anaesthete is the fourth full-length album by post-metal band Rosetta, and their first fully independent release.

== Release ==
The album was announced on Rosetta's blog on June 20, 2013 and self-released as a download via Bandcamp on August 8, 2013 using the Pay what you want pricing system. CD and LP releases were issued by Debemur Morti in Europe and War Crime Recordings in North America. Pelagic Records reissued the album on both formats in 2018.

Had The Anaesthete failed to recoup studio costs, Rosetta would have likely disbanded. The album recouped costs in 24 hours and remained the top-selling release on Bandcamp for nearly a month.

== Track listing ==
The Anaesthete track listing
No.	Title	Length
1.	"Ryu / Tradition"	10:22
2.	"Fudo / The Immovable Deity"	4:39
3.	"In & Yo / Dualities of the Way"	7:01
4.	"Oku / The Secrets"	6:30
5.	"Hodoku / Compassion"	5:47
6.	"Myo / The Miraculous"	3:02
7.	"Hara / The Center"	7:03
8.	"Ku / Emptiness"	8:05
9.	"Shugyo / Austerity"	6:13
Total length:		58:42

Japanese Edition bonus tracks
No.	Title	Length
10.	"Hodoku (Living Phantoms Remix)"	5:27
11.	"Oku (Living Phantoms Remix)"	6:03

== Personnel ==
Rosetta

- BJ McMurtrie – drums, production
- Dave Grossman – bass, vocals, production
- Matt Weed – guitar, piano, vocals, production
- Mike Armine – vocals, electronics, production

Guest

- Eric Jernigan – vocals on "Hodoku / Compassion"

Technical

- Andrew Schneider – production, engineering, mixing
- Francisco Botero – engineering
- Jack Counce – assistant engineer
- Daniel Florez – assistant engineer
- Colin Marston – mastering
