= The Galilean Satellites =

Studio album by Rosetta
- Released: October 18, 2005
- Recorded: August–December 2004
- Studios: Jane Doll Studio; Philadelphia, Pennsylvania
- Genres: Post-metal; sludge metal; space rock; ambient
- Length: 118:14
- Label: Translation Loss
- Producer: Rosetta

Rosetta chronology
| Demo (2004) | The Galilean Satellites (2005) | Project Mercury (2007) |

Professional ratings
Review scores
| Source | Rating |
|---|---|
| AllMusic | link |
| Blabbermouth.net | (8/10) link |
| Deadtide.com | link |
| Decibel Magazine | (favorable) link |
| Decoymusic | (favorable) link |
| Music Emissions | link |
| Splendid Magazine | (favorable) link |

The Galilean Satellites is the first studio album by American post-metal band Rosetta, released in 2005 on Translation Loss Records. The album is two discs long and the track lengths on each disc correspond to each other, indicating that the band intended for them to be played at the same time. Disc one is in a post-metal style while disc two is ambient noise.

== Production ==
Originally, the band intended to record a standard one-disc album and use the ambient pieces as segues; however, the band had enough material and the approval from Translation Loss to record a second disc. This setup was inspired by the Neurosis album Times of Grace.

Scott Hull of Pig Destroyer and Agoraphobic Nosebleed fame was originally hired to master the album; however, the band's dissatisfaction with his work caused him to leave the project, and guitarist Matt Weed did the mastering instead.

The album's gatefold artwork was designed by Hydra Head Records founder and artist Aaron Turner, after Translation Loss personnel asked him to create the art. The band members have stated that they are fans of Turner's work (Isis in particular, to which Rosetta is frequently compared).

== Release ==
The album was first released in 2005 in a limited-edition digipak format, then later in 2006 in a standard jewel case, both on Translation Loss Records. Additionally, an acoustic remix of "Au Pays Natal" was also recorded, but is not included in the album; rather, it was released as a download-only track on the band's website.

TGSV2.0, a CD-R recording synchronizing both discs together, was released during Rosetta's 2005 tour and available in extremely limited quantities. A 5.1 surround sound DVD-R version of the album was also made by the band which plays audio from the first disc in the front speakers and the second disc in the rear. The DVD also included three live videos. The first version, a plain disc, was sold at shows in 2006. A second edition was released for mail distribution in 2006 and 2007. These were very limited and are no longer available.

The album was released on vinyl on July 15, 2009 by E-Vinyl and Radar Swarm Records. Due to its length, the original first and second discs were released in separate, double-disc gatefold packages. Both were limited to 250 copies each of black and blue colored vinyl. The album was repressed on vinyl in 2018, again as two double-disc gatefolds, but with a different configuration. A limited edition box set was also released, containing a fifth LP with two bonus tracks: "The Nomad" and an acoustic version of "Au Pays Natal".

== Themes ==
The liner notes contain no lyrics; only the phrase "These songs are about a space man", indicative of the band's fascination with astronomy. The lyrics themselves also seem to be (on one level) about space travel, and make many references to Europa, one of the Galilean moons. The band themselves have stated that the songs tell a story about a man who becomes dissatisfied with the world around him and leaves to find a place of solitude (Europa). However, upon reaching it, he realizes that he left behind things that were meaningful to him.

The track names on disc two all are names of different stars: Deneb, Capella, Beta Aquilae, Ross 128, and Sol (the Latin name for our own sun). The track names on disc one are all French phrases (apart from "Europa", since "Absent" is the same in English and in French).

A monologue from episode 22 of the 1997 anime Berserk is sampled in the tracks "Itinérant" and "Au Pays Natal".

== Track listing ==
All tracks are written by Rosetta.

Disc one
| No. | Title | Length |
|---|---|---|
| 1. | "Départe" (lit. "departure") | 8:13 |
| 2. | "Europa" | 10:25 |
| 3. | "Absent" | 9:45 |
| 4. | "Itinérant" (lit. "itinerant") | 16:14 |
| 5. | "Au Pays Natal" (lit. "the homeland") | 13:32 |
| Total length: | | 58:09 |

Disc two
| No. | Title | Length |
|---|---|---|
| 1. | "Deneb" | 8:13 |
| 2. | "Capella" | 10:25 |
| 3. | "Beta Aquilae" | 9:45 |
| 4. | "Ross 128" | 16:14 |
| 5. | "Sol" | 15:28 |
| Total length: | | 60:05 |

Deluxe box set bonus disc
| No. | Title | Length |
|---|---|---|
| 1. | "Au Pays Natal" (acoustic version) | 13:27 |
| 2. | "The Nomad" | 5:01 |

== Personnel ==
The Galilean Satellites personnel adapted from liner notes.

Rosetta

- Michael Armine – sound manipulation, vocals
- David Grossman – bass, vocals
- Bruce McMurtrie Jr. – drums, engineering
- J. Matthew Weed – guitar, violin, mixing, mastering

Other personnel

- Aaron Turner – artwork, design
