= Reports from the Threshold of Death =

- Cover Artwork and Design by Ira Bronson

Studio album by Junius
- Released: October 25, 2011
- Recorded: Will Benoit's Radar Studios, Clinton, CT (Spring 2011)
- Genre: Alternative rock; post-rock; art rock; space rock; post-metal; alternative metal
- Length: 42:07
- Label: Prosthetic
- Producer: James Dunham

Junius chronology
The Martyrdom of a Catastrophist (2009)	Reports from the Threshold of Death (2011)	Days of the Fallen Sun (2014)

Reports from the Threshold of Death is the second full-length studio album from American art rock band Junius. The record was released in CD (digipak), limited edition Vinyl, and digital download format through Prosthetic Records on October 25, 2011.

== Background ==
On March 8, 2011, it was announced that Junius had signed to metal label Prosthetic Records and would be recording a new full-length album during the spring of 2011. During this time, the album was recorded by the band at Will Benoit's Radar Studios, a recording studio that relies entirely on solar energy and other sustainable practices. Producer and close friend of the band, James Dunham, described the two months spent working on the album with the band as his favorite experience as a hired producer, describing it as "truly rewarding".

On September 13, 2011, the track listing, album cover, release date, and a full stream of the song "All Shall Float" debuted on the independent music news website Brooklyn Vegan. Also, a promotional video directed by Matthew Schwab appeared on the homepage of the band's official website, which featured a snippet of the track "Betray the Grave" with background footage of the band rehearsing at Radar Studios. A full stream of the song "A Universe Without Stars" debuted on Guitar World on October 11, 2011. Eventually, the entire album was made available for streaming exclusively on the band's profile page at AbsolutePunk on October 20, 2011.

On October 25, 2011, Reports from the Threshold of Death was released worldwide. Music videos were released for "All Shall Float" and "Betray the Grave" respectively.

== Theme ==
Betray the Grave (official music video)

Following the death of Immanuel Velikovsky on The Martyrdom of a Catastrophist, Reports from the Threshold of Death continues the examination of the human spirit by following its journey after death. Joseph Martinez has stated that this album is very personal to the band, as members have lost close friends and family in the recent years leading up to the album's writing and recording.

The album's title is a reference to near death experiences, while the album itself is based on the experiences of those who have died and come back.

== Reception ==
Professional ratings
Review scores
Source	Rating
Revolver	3.5/5 stars
MetalSucks	(favorable)
the Racquette	(favorable)
MSN	(favorable)
Blistering	8/10 stars
Blogcritics Music	(mixed)
Exclaim!	(favorable)

Reports from the Threshold of Death was generally well received by critics and fans alike.

Exploding in Sound called the album "album of the week" for the week of November 1, 2011, stating "If you are a fan of nu-wave, post-rock, post-metal, or pretty much post-anything, there's little chance you won't fall all over yourself loving this beast of an album". The metal album review site Sorrow Eternal rated the album 9/10 and awarded Junius "Band Of The Month for November" for their work on the album and their live performance. On November 2, 2011, the album was featured on The A.V. Club monthly LOUD list. Describing the album, list author Jason Heller expressed "The ethereality oozes like congealed plasma out of this one; there's an almost cathedral-like shiver to the disc's jet-black majesty."

Decibel Magazine ranked Reports from the Threshold of Death No. 10 in their "Top 40 Extreme Albums of 2011" list. AOL's music news website Noisecreep placed the album at No. 3 in their "Best Albums of 2011" list. MSN's music blog Headbang included the title in their end of the year list as well, ranking it No. 25 in their "Top 50 Albums of 2011" list.

== Track listing ==
All tracks are written by Junius.

No.	Title	Length
1.	"Betray the Grave"	4:15
2.	"All Shall Float"	4:33
3.	"Dance on Blood"	4:35
4.	"A Universe Without Stars"	4:24
5.	"Haunts for Love"	4:18
6.	"The Meeting of Pasts"	4:18
7.	"(Spirit Guidance)"	1:41
8.	"A Reflection on Fire"	4:08
9.	"Transcend the Ghost"	5:12
10.	"Eidolon & Perispirit"	5:20
Total length:		42:07

== Personnel ==
Reports from the Threshold of Death album personnel adapted from the CD liner notes

Junius

- Joseph E. Martinez – vocals, lyrics, guitar, synths
- Michael Repasch-Nieves – guitar
- Joel Munguia – bass
- Dana Filloon – drums

Production

- James Dunham (of InAeona) & Junius – production, mixing
- Will Benoit (of Constants) & Daryl Rabidoux – engineering assistants
- Nick Zampiello & Rob Gonnella – mastering at New Alliance East in Cambridge, MA

Art

- Ira Bronson (of Black Day Creative) – Album artwork, design, and layout
