= Blood Is Bright =

EP by Junius
- Released: January 1, 2006
- Genre: Art rock, post-rock, indie rock
- Length: 20:58
- Label: Radar Recordings (CDEP) (RDR-111)
- Producer: Will Benoit

Junius chronology
Forcing Out the Silence (2004)	Blood Is Bright (2006)	The Fires of Antediluvia (2007)

Professional ratings
Review scores
Source	Rating
AbsolutePunk	(77%)
Scene Point Blank	9/10 stars
Metal Storm	8/10 stars
Decoy Music	4.5/5 stars
Exclaim!	(favorable)
Punknews.org	3/5 stars

Blood Is Bright is the second EP by American art rock band Junius. It was originally released on January 1, 2006, through Radar Recordings. The EP was released as a remastered version by Pelagic Records in 2020.

== Track listing ==
All tracks are written by Junius.

No.	Title	Length
1.	"[The Annunciation]"	0:36
2.	"Blood Is Bright"	4:51
3.	"A Word Could Kill Her"	4:06
4.	"In The Heart Of Titans"	6:06
5.	"At The Age Of Decay"	5:20
Total length:		20:58

== Personnel ==
=== Junius ===
- Joseph E. Martinez – guitar, vocals
- Michael Repasch-Nieves – guitar
- Kieffer Infantino – bass
- Dana Filloon – drums

=== Production ===
- Will Benoit – production
- Nick Zampiello – mastering
