= Forcing Out the Silence =

Junius
- Cover artwork by Michael Repasch-Nieves

EP by Junius
- Released: January 1, 2004; January 30, 2015 (re-release)
- Genre: Art rock, post-rock, indie rock
- Length: 20:38
- Label: Radar Recordings (CDEP) (RDR-105)
- Producer: Will Benoit

Junius chronology
Junius (2004)	Blood Is Bright (2006)

Singles from Forcing Out the Silence
- 1. "Hiding Knives" Released: 2004

Forcing Out the Silence is the first EP by American art rock band Junius. It was originally released by Radar Recordings on January 1, 2004, but was later re-released on September 9, 2008 in its original packaging. The album was remastered for a 10th anniversary re-release on January 30, 2015.

== Background ==
Following the release of Forcing Out the Silence, Junius immediately began touring, playing more than two hundred shows over the duration of around nine months. The band has toured frequently ever since.

Professional ratings
Review scores
Source	Rating
EvilSponge	4/5 stars
Decoy Music	4/5 stars

== Track listing ==
All tracks are written by Junius.

No.	Title	Length
1.	"[Elan Vital]"	1:12
2.	"Hiding Knives"	5:27
3.	"From the Isle of the Blessed"	5:05
4.	"[Elan Fatale]"	2:11
5.	"Forcing out the Silence"	6:43
Total length:		20:38

== Personnel ==
Junius

- Joseph E. Martinez – guitar, vocals
- Michael Repasch-Nieves – guitar
- Dave Soucy – bass
- Dana Filloon – drums

Production

- Will Benoit – production
- Nick Zampiello – mastering
