= The Martyrdom of a Catastrophist =

- Cover Artwork by Drew Speziale

Studio album by Junius
- Released: September 04, 2009
- Recorded: March 2007 – July 2008
- Studio: Henson, Hollywood, California
- Genre: Alternative rock, art rock, post-rock, indie rock, post-punk
- Length: 48:55
- Label: The Mylene Sheath (North America + UK); Make My Day Records (Europe)
- Producer: Junius

Junius chronology
Junius (2007)	The Martyrdom of a Catastrophist (2009)	Reports from the Threshold of Death (2011)

The Martyrdom of a Catastrophist is the first full-length studio album from American art rock band Junius. It was released on September 4, 2009 through The Mylene Sheath and Make My Day Records in digipak, vinyl and digital download formats.

The album is based on the life and works of theorist Immanuel Velikovsky.

== Reception ==
Professional ratings
Review scores
Source	Rating
Pitchfork	7.5/10 stars
PopMatters	8/10 stars
Maelstrom	9.5/10 stars
Exploding in Sound	(favorable)
Philadelphia City Paper	(favorable)
The Punk Vault	5/5 stars
Lambgoat	9/10 stars
Metal.de	8/10 stars
Strangeglue	9/10 stars
Decoy Music	4/5 stars
Punknews.org	3.5/5 stars

The Martyrdom of a Catastrophist is widely considered to be the band's most seminal work. It is their first album to garner widespread critical attention, including that of mainstream media outlets such as Pitchfork and Rolling Stone. Thus far, the album has been met with near universal acclaim.

On December 17, 2009 the album was profiled in the Rolling Stone "Hype Monitor!".

The album is currently ranked No. 21 on Sputnikmusic's top 100 highest rated albums for the year 2009.

== Track listing ==
No.	Title	Writer(s)	Length
1.	"Birth Rites By Torchlight"	Junius; Ira Bronson	5:19
2.	"The Antediluvian Fire"	Junius; Ira Bronson	7:20
3.	"(turning to the Spirits of the hours...)"	Junius; Ira Bronson	1:01
4.	"A Dramatist Plays Catastrophist"	Junius	5:02
5.	"Ten Year Librarian"	Junius	8:18
6.	"Stargazers & Gravediggers"	Junius	4:36
7.	"(...he fell before her)"	Junius	1:27
8.	"Elisheva, I Love You"	Junius	3:52
9.	"Letters From Saint Angelica"	Junius; Ira Bronson	6:05
10.	"The Mourning Eulogy"	Junius	5:55
Total length:			48:55

== Track notes ==
- Before the initial release of The Martyrdom of a Catastrophist, the tracks "Birth Rites By Torchlight" and "The Mourning Eulogy" were featured in two episodes of the horror film series Dark Path Chronicles by Mary Lambert.
- The album track "Elisheva, I Love You" was added to the music video game Rock Band on March 15, 2010.

== Personnel ==
The Martyrdom of a Catastrophist album personnel adapted from the CD liner notes

Junius

- Joseph E. Martinez – vocals, lyrics, guitar
- Michael Repasch-Nieves – guitar
- Joel Munguia – bass
- Dana Filloon – drums

Guest Appearances

- Immanuel Velikovsky – quotes
- Will Benoit, Jess Collins, Bridge Laviazar, Dave Soucy, & Orion Wainer – gang vocals
- Ira Bronson – additional writing contributions

Production

- David Collins – mastering
- Kevin Mills & Tom Syrowski – mixing, recording
- Will Benoit & James Dunham – additional vocal recording
- Brandie Doyle, Nico Essig, Derek Karlquist, Paul Lamalfa, & Jorge Velasco – engineering assistants

Art

- Drew Speziale (of Circle Takes the Square)- cover illustrations
- Matt Gauck – interior illustrations
- Michael Repasch-Nieves – layout, design
- Ira Bronson (Black Day Creative) – additional design
