= U-77891 =

Chemical compound

Clinical data
- Routes of administration: By mouth, parenteral

Identifiers
- IUPAC name: 3,4-Dibromo-N-methyl-N-[(5S,6R)-1-methyl-1-azaspiro[4.5]decan-6-yl]benzamide
- CAS Number: 119878-31-8
- PubChem CID: 117071705
- ChemSpider: 23120785
- UNII: 7P6974D7RX
- ChEMBL: ChEMBL279065

Chemical and physical data
- Formula: C_{18}H_{24}Br_{2}N_{2}O
- Molar mass: 444.211 g·mol^{−1}
- 3D model (JSmol): Interactive image
- SMILES: CN1CCC[C@]12CCCC[C@H]2N(C)C(=O)c3ccc(Br)c(Br)c3
- InChI: InChI=1S/C18H24Br2N2O/c1-21-11-5-10-18(21)9-4-3-6-16(18)22(2)17(23)13-7-8-14(19)15(20)12-13/h7-8,12,16H,3-6,9-11H2,1-2H3/t16-,18+/m1/s1; Key:XHBTZWGPHRHWQZ-AEFFLSMTSA-N

U-77891 is an opioid analgesic drug that was first synthesized in 1983 by the Upjohn company. It was originally synthesized to prove that the removal of a single methylene spacer of the benzamide would alter a κ-opioid receptor agonist such as U-50488 into an μ-opioid receptor agonist, as well as producing a semi-rigid derivative of U-47700. This would help elucidate the relative positions of the hydrogen-bond acceptors and substituted aromatic system to find the compound with the lowest K_{i} value in a series of benzamide opioids dating back to the 1970s. The original work found a mixture of agonists and antagonists.

U-77891 acts as an agonist of the μ-opioid, δ-opioid and κ-opioid receptors with K_{i} values of 2, 105, and 2300 nM, respectively. The compound has ED_{50} values of 0.02 mg/kg and 0.21 mg/kg in mouse phenylquinone writhing and tail-flick assays. One reason for the high potency is the LogP of 4.57, allowing it to accumulate in fatty tissue such as the brain.

== See also ==
- AH-7921
- U-69,593
