= U-47700 =

Opioid analgesic

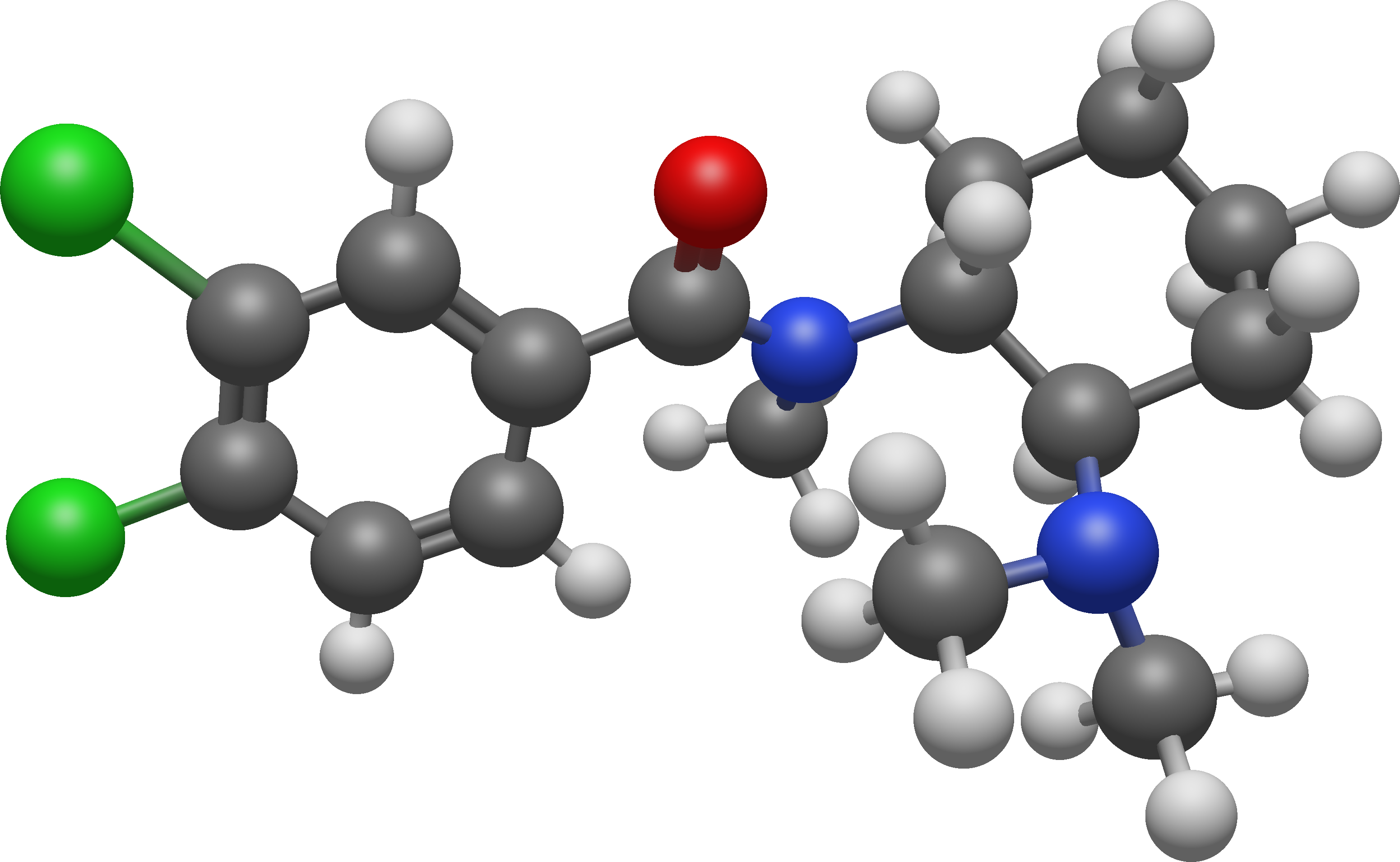

Legal status
- Legal status: AU: S9 (Prohibited substance); BR: Class F1 (Prohibited narcotics); CA: Schedule I; DE: Anlage II (Authorized trade only, not prescriptible); UK: Class A; US: Schedule I; In general Unscheduled, Illegal in Finland, China and Sweden

Identifiers
- IUPAC name: 3,4-Dichloro-N-[(1R,2R)-2-(dimethylamino)cyclohexyl]-N-methylbenzamide
- CAS Number: 82657-23-6
- PubChem CID: 13544016
- ChemSpider: 23113403
- UNII: 6IY4WX208T
- KEGG: C22730
- ChEMBL: ChEMBL277572
- CompTox Dashboard (EPA): DTXSID001014181

Chemical and physical data
- Formula: C_{16}H_{22}Cl_{2}N_{2}O
- Molar mass: 329.27 g·mol^{−1}
- 3D model (JSmol): Interactive image
- SMILES: ClC1=C(C=CC(=C1)C(=O)N(C)[C@@H]2CCCC[C@H]2N(C)C)Cl
- InChI: InChI=1S/C16H22Cl2N2O/c1-19(2)14-6-4-5-7-15(14)20(3)16(21)11-8-9-12(17)13(18)10-11/h8-10,14-15H,4-7H2,1-3H3/t14-,15-/m1/s1; Key:JGPNMZWFVRQNGU-HUUCEWRRSA-N

U-47700, also known as U4, pink heroin, pinky, and pink, is an opioid analgesic drug developed by a team at Upjohn in the 1970s which has around 7.5 times the potency of morphine in animal models.

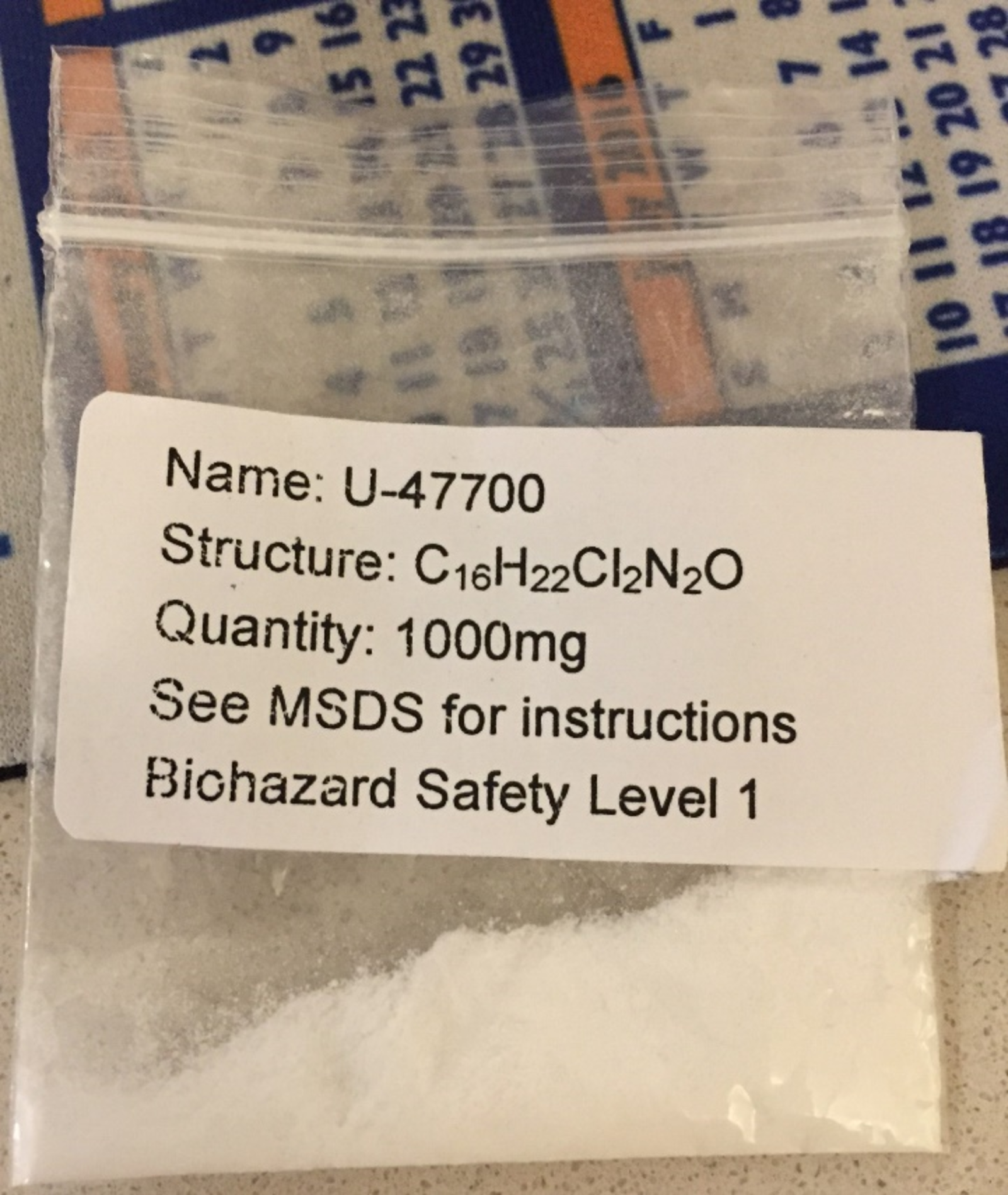
Physical Sample of U-47700

U-47700 is a structural isomer of the earlier opioid AH-7921 and the result of a great deal of work elucidating the quantitative structure–activity relationship of the scaffold. Upjohn looked for the key moieties which gave the greatest activity and posted over a dozen patents on related compounds, each optimizing one moiety until they discovered that U-47700 was the most active.

U-47700 became the lead compound of selective kappa-opioid receptor ligands such as U-50488, U-51754 (containing a pyrrolidine rather than a dimethylamine substituent) and U-69,593, which share very similar structures. Although not used medically, the selective kappa ligands are used in research.

== Pharmacology ==
U-47700 is an agonist of the μ-opioid receptor (K_{i} 11.1 ± 0.4 nM) and possesses significantly lower affinity for the κ-opioid receptor (K_{i} = 287 ± 24 nM) and δ-opioid receptor (K_{i} = 1220 ± 82 nM). U-47700 is approximately 10-fold more potent than morphine in rats, although the binding of U-47700 is 2–4 times weaker than morphine at all three opioid receptors.

The metabolism of U-47700 in humans involves mono- and didesmethylation followed by hydroxylation. The desmethyl metabolites of U-47700 have negligible affinity for the opioid receptors and are not thought to contribute to the activity of U-47700.

== Side effects ==
U-47700 has never been studied in humans, but it would be expected to produce effects similar to those of other potent opioid agonists, including strong analgesia, sedation, euphoria, constipation, itching and respiratory depression which could be harmful or fatal. Tachycardia was another side effect encountered with U-47700 use. Tolerance and dependence would be expected to develop.

=== Deaths ===
Combined consumption of U-47700 with fentanyl and flubromazepam caused one fatality each in Belgium and Germany, respectively. One death was reported in Ireland and another one in Italy. 17 opioid overdoses and several deaths in the United States had initially been associated with U-47700 in April 2016. As of September 2016 at least 15 fatalities were confirmed. By December 2017, at least 46 fatalities had been associated with the use of U-47700.

U-47700 was found in combination with fentanyl during the autopsy of the American artist Prince in 2016.

=== Detection in biological fluids ===
U-47700 may be measured in serum, plasma, blood or urine to monitor for abuse, confirm a diagnosis of poisoning, or assist in a medicolegal death investigation. Serum or blood U-47700 concentrations are expected to be in a range of 10–250 μg/L in intoxicated patients and 100–1,500 μg/L in deceased victims of acute overdosage. The detection usually involves analysis by liquid chromatography-mass spectrometry.

== Society and culture ==
Common street names for U-47700 include pinky, pink, and U4.

=== Legal status ===
Following its sale as a designer drug, U-47700 was made illegal in Sweden on January 26, 2016.

U-47700 was emergency scheduled in Ohio on May 3, 2016, by executive order of Governor John Kasich.

U-47700 was emergency scheduled in Florida on September 27, 2016, by an emergency rule of Florida Attorney General Pam Bondi.

Responding to a perceived threat to public health and safety, the U.S. Drug Enforcement Administration has placed U-47700 into Schedule I of the Controlled Substances Act, effective November 14, 2016. In April 2018, U-47700 was placed into Schedule I indefinitely.

U-47700 was placed into Schedule 1 of South Dakota's Controlled Substance Schedule. It was signed by Governor Daugaard on February 9, 2017.

U-47700 was made a Class A, Schedule 1 drug under the Misuse of Drugs Act in the UK in 2017.

=== In popular culture ===
U-47700 is the title of a 2021 Dutch sci-fi short film by director Erasmo de la Parra. In the film, the characters are addicted to a new drug containing the substance U-47700.

== See also ==
- Metonitazene
- Spiradoline
- U-69,593
- U-77891
- U-50488
- 3,4-MDO-U-47700
- Utopioid
