= Spiradoline =

Selective κ-opioid agonist drug

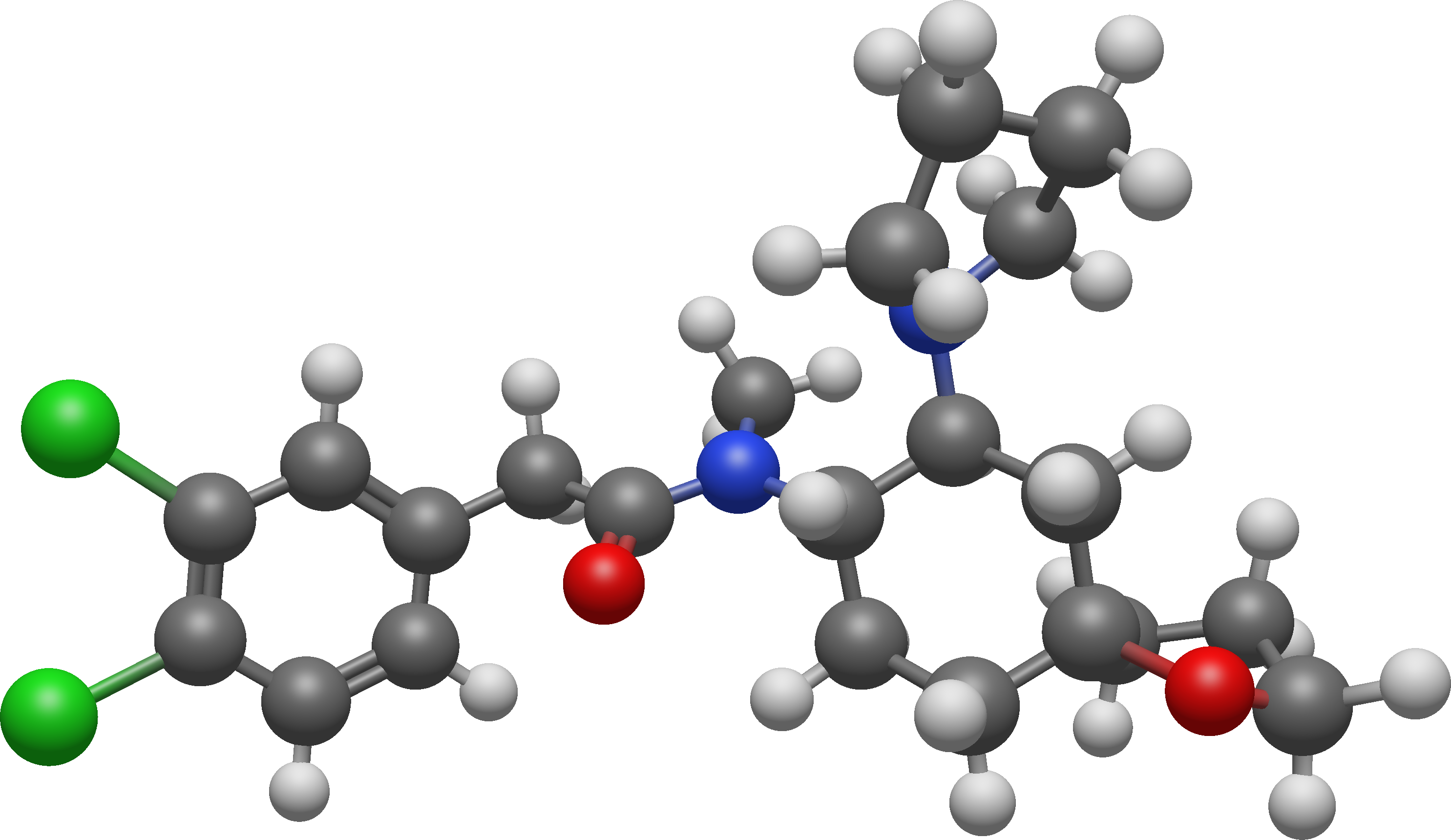

Clinical data
- Drug class: κ-Opioid receptor agonist; Hallucinogen
- ATC code: None

Identifiers
- IUPAC name: 2-(3,4-Dichlorophenyl)-N-methyl-N-[(5R,7S,8S)-7-pyrrolidin-1-yl-1-oxaspiro[4.5]decan-8-yl] acetamide
- CAS Number: 87151-85-7
- PubChem CID: 55652
- IUPHAR/BPS: 1653
- ChemSpider: 50257
- UNII: N18ZH0M4NP
- ChEMBL: ChEMBL118865
- CompTox Dashboard (EPA): DTXSID1048679

Chemical and physical data
- Formula: C_{22}H_{30}Cl_{2}N_{2}O_{2}
- Molar mass: 425.39 g·mol^{−1}
- 3D model (JSmol): Interactive image
- SMILES: CN([C@H]1CC[C@@]2(CCCO2)C[C@@H]1N3CCCC3)C(=O)CC4=CC(=C(C=C4)Cl)Cl
- InChI: InChI=1S/C22H30Cl2N2O2/c1-25(21(27)14-16-5-6-17(23)18(24)13-16)19-7-9-22(8-4-12-28-22)15-20(19)26-10-2-3-11-26/h5-6,13,19-20H,2-4,7-12,14-15H2,1H3/t19-,20-,22-/m0/s1; Key:NYKCGQQJNVPOLU-ONTIZHBOSA-N

Spiradoline (U-62066) is a drug which acts as a highly selective κ-opioid agonist. It has analgesic, diuretic, and antitussive effects, and produces subjective effects in animals similar to those of ketazocine and alazocine. The main effect in humans is sedation, along with analgesic and diuretic effects, but significant side effects such as dysphoria and hallucinations have stopped it from being used clinically.

== See also ==
- κ-Opioid receptor agonist
- Enadoline
