= AH-7921 =

Opioid analgesic

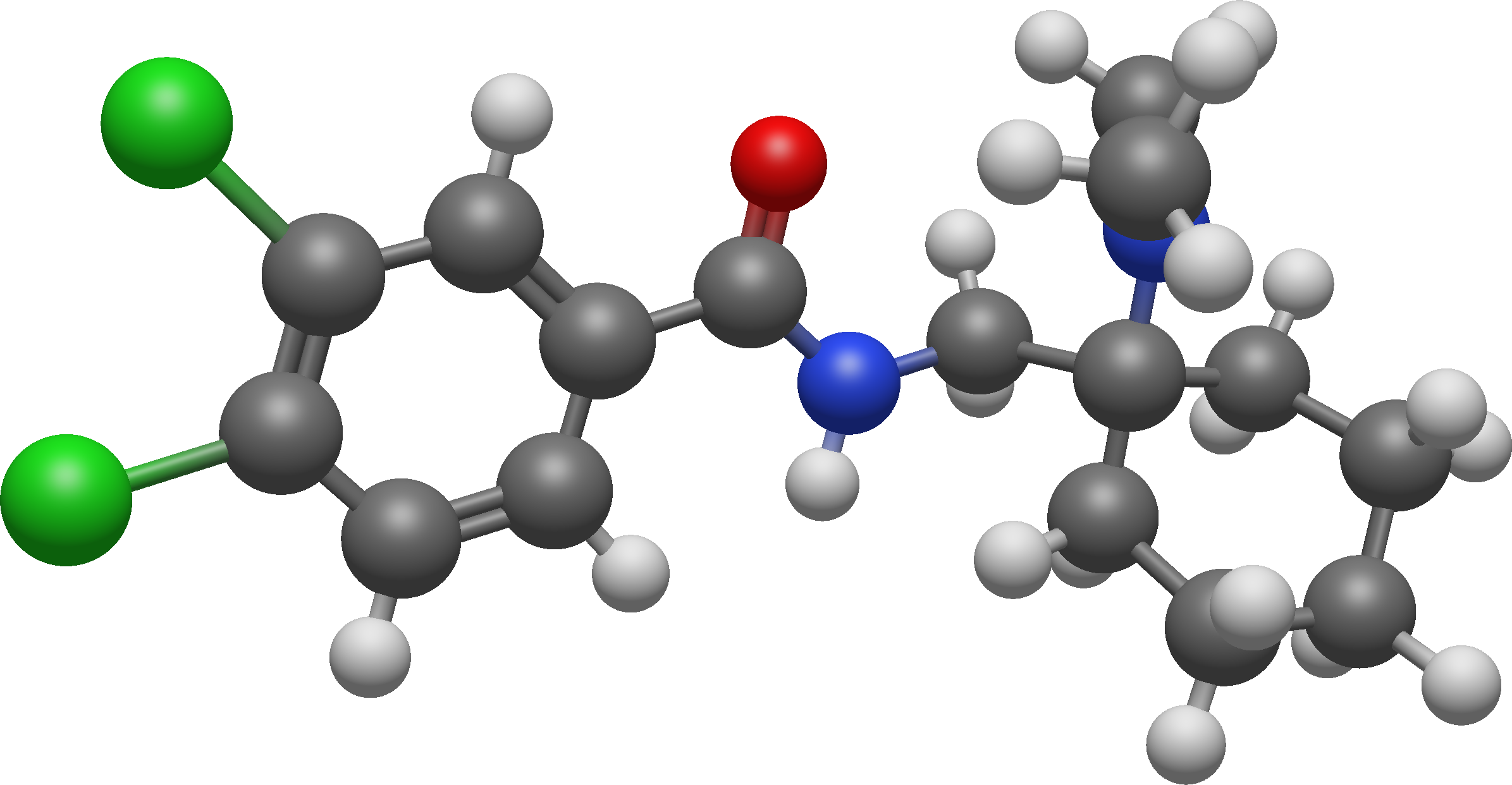

Clinical data
- Other names: AH-7921
- Routes of administration: Recreational: insufflation, sublingual, intravenous, oral, rectal
- ATC code: none

Legal status
- Legal status: AU: S9 (Prohibited substance); BR: Class F1 (Prohibited narcotics); CA: Schedule I; DE: Anlage II; In General Unscheduled, Illegal in Sweden, Czech Republic, China, Brazil and Israel.: UK: Class A; US: Schedule I

Identifiers
- IUPAC name: 3,4-dichloro-N-{[1-(dimethylamino)cyclohexyl]methyl}benzamide
- CAS Number: 55154-30-8
- PubChem CID: 187760
- ChemSpider: 163208
- UNII: 10BR7A0SO0
- KEGG: C22729
- CompTox Dashboard (EPA): DTXSID70203662

Chemical and physical data
- Formula: C_{16}H_{22}Cl_{2}N_{2}O
- Molar mass: 329.27 g·mol^{−1}
- 3D model (JSmol): Interactive image
- SMILES: ClC1=CC=C(C(NCC2(CCCCC2)N(C)C)=O)C=C1Cl
- InChI: InChI=1S/C16H22Cl2N2O/c1-20(2)16(8-4-3-5-9-16)11-19-15(21)12-6-7-13(17)14(18)10-12/h6-7,10H,3-5,8-9,11H2,1-2H3,(H,19,21); Key:JMZROFPPEXCTST-UHFFFAOYSA-N

AH-7921 (Doxylam) is an opioid analgesic drug selective for the μ-opioid receptor, having around 90% the potency of morphine when administered orally. It was discovered in the 1970s by a team at Allen and Hanburys located in the United Kingdom. The drug is considered a new psychoactive substance (NPS), a designation of compounds designed to mimic the effects controlled substances. It has also been sold on the internet since 2012 as a "research chemical". When sold online it may be called the alternative name doxylam, not to be confused with doxylamine. AH-7921 has never progressed to clinical trials. The DEA is not aware of any medical usage in the United States, and has not insisted the Health and Human Services department (HHS) to conduct any medical research of the substance's uses.

== Side effects and withdrawal ==
With doses that usually range from 10 to 150 mg, users are likely to experience effects similar to heroin, morphine, and fentanyl such as euphoria and respiratory depression. When an overdose occurs users often experience tachycardia, hypertension, and seizures. Mice, dogs, and monkeys, have been used in tests which showed the drug was almost equivalently potent to morphine, and had a very steep dose response curve. Rats given 20 mg doses three times a day for five days experienced withdrawal symptoms similar to other opioids. Reports have shown users to experience depression and insomnia when withdrawing from this drug.

== Chemistry ==
AH-7921 is commonly found as an off-white solid with a melting point between 215–216º Celsius. It is one single covalently bonded unit with 4 rotatable bonds. It also has two hydrogen bond acceptors, and one hydrogen bond donor.

== Use ==
Although AH-7921 was extensively studied in vitro and in animals, though not in humans, by the developing company, it was never sold commercially for medical use. In 2013, AH-7921 was discovered to have been used as an active ingredient in "synthetic cannabis" products in Japan. In October 2015, two horses (Bossmon and Literata) trained by owner-trainer Roy Sedlacek tested positive for AH-7921 at Belmont Park racetrack. Norway and Iceland use this substance as an analytical reference standard in which it can be ordered online from chemical suppliers; however, labels are required to state that it is not for human consumption thus conforming to the law. Within ten months from 2013 to 2014, there had been serious fatalities reported from this drug from four different countries. The first fatality was a 19-year-old male who had a 3.9 mg/L AH-7921 concentration of heart blood leading medical examiners to confirm the death was an opioid intoxication. In another case, a 22-year-old woman was found dead with a femoral blood to AH-7921 concentration of 450 μg/L.

A 2018 review of published case reports found a total of 14 cases, of which 13 resulted in death. The oral route of administration was reported in two cases, and most cases reported use of concomitant pharmaceutical agents. Postmortem autopsies found that pulmonary edema was the most common finding, with nine of the cases having heavier lungs. Overall, fatalities occurred with low and high concentrations of AH-7921 in femoral blood.

== Legality ==
AH-7921 was made a Prohibited Substance (Schedule 9 of the Standard for the Uniform Scheduling of Medicines and Poisons) in Australia in May 2014. Although this amendment was repealed in June 2014, which simply means the amendment document ceases, but the actual scheduling is permanent as part of the main document (all SUSMP amendments cease after a few weeks). It may, however, still be a banned import.

AH-7921 has been illegal to distribute in Israel since December 2013.

In the UK, AH-7921 was included as a Class A drug in January 2015 as part of The Misuse of Drugs Act 1971 (Amendment) (No. 2) Order 2014.

In Brazil, AH-7921 has been an illegal drug since May 2015.

As of October 2015 AH-7921 is a controlled substance in China.

AH-7921 is banned in the Czech Republic.

In the United States, AH-7921 was placed into Schedule I of the Controlled Substances Act on May 16, 2016, due to its lack of medical use. Furthermore, any person who wishes to manufacture, distribute, import, export, research, and educate using the substance, must be registered by the Drug Enforcement Administration.

The Canadian Controlled Drugs and Substances Act was amended in 2016 to include the substance as a Schedule I substance. Possession without legal authority can result in maximum 7 years imprisonment. Further, Health Canada amended the Food and Drug Regulations in May, 2016 to classify AH-7921 as a restricted drug. Only those with a law enforcement agency, person with an exemption permit or institutions with Minister's authorization may possess the drug in Canada.

== See also ==
- Bromadoline
- U-47700
- U-77891
