= U-69,593 =

Chemical compound

Clinical data
- ATC code: none

Identifiers
- IUPAC name: N-methyl-2-phenyl-N-[(5R,7S,8S)-7-(pyrrolidin-1-yl)-1-oxaspiro[4.5]dec-8-yl]acetamide
- CAS Number: 96744-75-1
- PubChem CID: 105104
- IUPHAR/BPS: 1655
- ChemSpider: 94828
- UNII: J5S4K6TKTG
- ChEBI: CHEBI:73357
- ChEMBL: ChEMBL440765
- CompTox Dashboard (EPA): DTXSID3046326

Chemical and physical data
- Formula: C_{22}H_{32}N_{2}O_{2}
- Molar mass: 356.510 g·mol^{−1}
- 3D model (JSmol): Interactive image
- SMILES: O=C(N([C@H]3CC[C@]1(OCCC1)C[C@@H]3N2CCCC2)C)Cc4ccccc4

U-69,593 is a drug which acts as a potent and selective κ_{1}-opioid receptor agonist. In animal studies it has been shown to produce antinociception, anti-inflammation, anxiolysis (at low doses), respiratory depression, and diuresis, while having little effect on gastrointestinal motility. It also inhibits the peripheral, though not central secretion of oxytocin and vasopressin in rats.

== See also ==
- U-50,488
- The dichloro analog is called spiradoline.
