= U-50488 =

Chemical compound

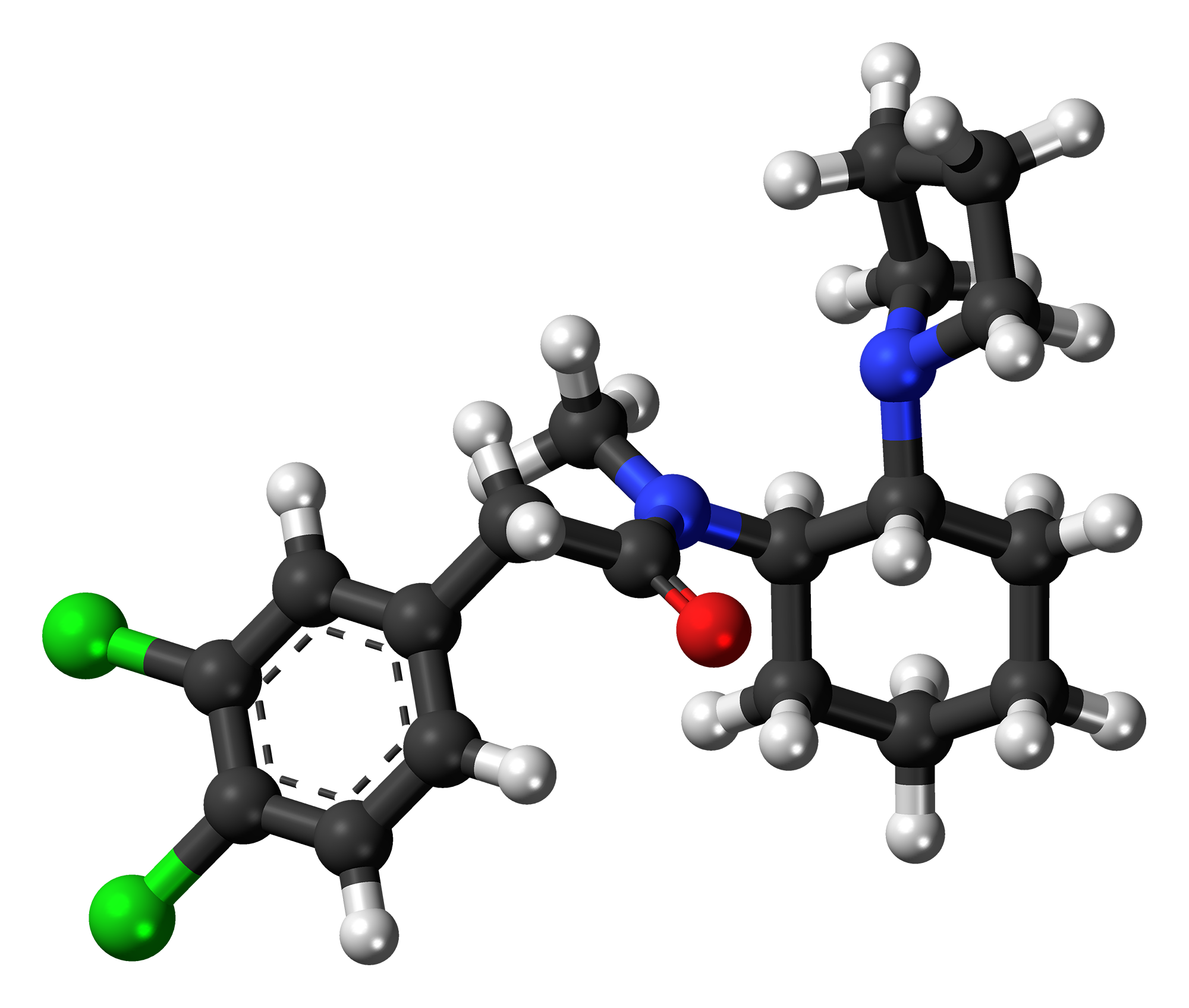

Identifiers
- IUPAC name: 2-(3,4-dichlorophenyl)-N-methyl-N-[(1R,2R)-2-pyrrolidin-1-ylcyclohexyl]acetamide
- CAS Number: 67198-13-4
- PubChem CID: 3036289
- IUPHAR/BPS: 1652
- ChemSpider: 2300345
- UNII: 39K8JHE8XN
- ChEBI: CHEBI:73358
- ChEMBL: ChEMBL441765
- CompTox Dashboard (EPA): DTXSID60953023

Chemical and physical data
- Formula: C_{19}H_{26}Cl_{2}N_{2}O
- Molar mass: 369.33 g·mol^{−1}
- 3D model (JSmol): Interactive image
- SMILES: CN([C@@H]1CCCC[C@H]1N2CCCC2)C(=O)CC3=CC(=C(C=C3)Cl)Cl
- InChI: InChI=1S/C19H26Cl2N2O/c1-22(19(24)13-14-8-9-15(20)16(21)12-14)17-6-2-3-7-18(17)23-10-4-5-11-23/h8-9,12,17-18H,2-7,10-11,13H2,1H3/t17-,18-/m1/s1; Key:VQLPLYSROCPWFF-QZTJIDSGSA-N

U-50488 is a drug which acts as a highly selective κ-opioid agonist, but without any μ-opioid antagonist effects. It has analgesic, diuretic and antitussive effects, and reverses the memory impairment produced by anticholinergic drugs. U-50488 was one of the first selective kappa agonists invented and research on its derivatives has led to the development of a large family of related compounds. This compound has never received FDA approval and there are no reported human cases in the literature involving an U-50488 overdose.

== See also ==
- LPK-26
- U-47700
- U-69,593
