= C18H23NO3 =

The molecular formula C_{18}H_{23}NO_{3} (molar mass : 301.38 g/mol, exact mass : 301.167794) may refer to:

- 3C-BZ, a psychedelic drug
- 24H-NBOMe
- 25H-NBOMe
- Butopamine
- Dihydrocodeine, a semi-synthetic opioid analgesic
- Dihydroisocodeine
- Dobutamine
- Isoxsuprine
- Levdobutamine
- Methyldihydromorphine
- Phenescaline
- Ractopamine
- Solpecainol
