= C18H21NO3 =

The molecular formula C_{18}H_{21}NO_{3} (molar mass : 299.36 g/mol) may refer to:

- Codeine
- Erythravine
- Heterocodeine
- Hydrocodone
- Isocodeine
- Metopon
- Pseudocodeine
