= C19H23NO4 =

The molecular formula C_{19}H_{23}NO_{4} (molar mass : 329.39 g/mol, exact mass : 329.162708) may refer to:

- 14-Methoxymetopon, an opoid
- Methylecgonine cinnamate, a tropane alkaloid
- Naloxol, an opoid antagonist
- Reticuline, an alkaloid
- Salutaridinol, an alkaloid
- Sinomenine, an alkaloid
