= Dihydroisocodeine =

Names
- IUPAC name 3-Methoxy-17-methyl-4,5α-epoxymorphinan-6β-ol
- Systematic IUPAC name (4R,4aR,7R,7aR,12bS)-9-Methoxy-3-methyl-2,3,4,4a,5,6,7,7a-octahydro-1H-4,12-methano[1]benzofuro[3,2-e]isoquinolin-7-ol
- Other names DHIC

Identifiers
CAS Number	795-38-0
3D model (JSmol)	Interactive image
ChemSpider	4591214
PubChem CID	5492898
UNII	9H2016E13H
CompTox Dashboard (EPA)	DTXSID2048907
- InChI: InChI=1S/C18H23NO3/c1-19-8-7-18-11-4-5-13(20)17(18)22-16-14(21-2)6-3-10(15(16)18)9-12(11)19/h3,6,11-13,17,20H,4-5,7-9H2,1-2H3/t11-,12+,13+,17-,18-/m0/s1 Key: RBOXVHNMENFORY-KEMUOJQUSA-N
- SMILES: CN1CC[C@]23[C@@H]4[C@H]1CC5=C2C(=C(C=C5)OC)O[C@H]3[C@@H](CC4)O

Properties
Chemical formula	C_{18}H_{23}NO_{3}
Molar mass	301.386 g·mol^{−1}
- Except where otherwise noted, data are given for materials in their standard state (at 25 °C [77 °F], 100 kPa). Infobox references

Dihydroisocodeine is an opioid. The National Research Council of the United States reported in 1941 that isocodeine is one of four isomers of codeine known at the time (heterocodeine can be considered a fifth) and DHIC, then in use in Europe as a pharmaceutical, was four times stronger than dihydrocodeine as isocodeine is four times stronger than codeine. The other isomers of codeine are allocodeine and pseudocodeine and they are active drugs as is heterocodeine, which is estimated to be up to 108 times as potent as codeine.
