= Salutaridinol 7-O-acetyltransferase =

salutaridinol 7-O-acetyltransferase

Identifiers
- EC no.: 2.3.1.150
- CAS no.: 156859-13-1

Databases
- IntEnz: IntEnz view
- BRENDA: BRENDA entry
- ExPASy: NiceZyme view
- KEGG: KEGG entry
- MetaCyc: metabolic pathway
- PRIAM: profile
- PDB structures: RCSB PDB PDBe PDBsum
- Gene Ontology: AmiGO / QuickGO
Search
- PMC: articles
- PubMed: articles
- NCBI: proteins

In enzymology, salutaridinol 7-O-acetyltransferase (EC 2.3.1.150) is an enzyme that catalyzes the chemical reaction

salutaridinol
+
acetyl-CoA
CoA
7-O-acetylsalutaridinol

The two substrates of this enzyme are the alkaloid salutaridinol and acetyl-CoA. Its products are 7-O-acetylsalutaridinol and coenzyme-A (CoA).

This enzyme belongs to the family of transferases, specifically those acyltransferases transferring groups other than aminoacyl groups. The systematic name of this enzyme class is acetyl-CoA:salutaridinol 7-O-acetyltransferase. This enzyme participates in alkaloid biosynthesis leading to thebaine and morphine.
