= Total synthesis of morphine and related alkaloids =

Laboratory synthesis of natural chemicals

Morphine

Synthesis of morphine-like alkaloids in chemistry describes the total synthesis of the natural morphinan class of alkaloids that includes codeine, morphine, oripavine, and thebaine and the closely related semisynthetic analogs methorphan, buprenorphine, hydromorphone, hydrocodone, isocodeine, naltrexone, nalbuphine, oxymorphone, oxycodone, and naloxone.

The structure of morphine is not particularly complex, however the electrostatic polarization of adjacent bonded atoms does not alternate uniformly throughout the structure. This "dissonant connectivity" makes bond formation more difficult and therefore significantly complicates any synthetic strategy that is applied to this family of molecules.

The first morphine total synthesis, devised by Marshall D. Gates, Jr. in 1952 remains a widely used example of total synthesis. This synthesis took a total of 31 steps and proceeded in 0.06% overall yield. The hydrocodone synthesis of Kenner C. Rice is one of the most efficient and proceeds in 30% overall yield in 14 steps. At 9 steps, the Barriault route is the shortest to date, but contains a number of low-yielding steps and is racemic.

Several other syntheses were reported, notably by the research groups of Evans, Fuchs, Parker, Overman, Mulzer-Trauner, White, Taber, Trost, Fukuyama, Guillou, Stork, Magnus, Smith, and Barriault.

== Gates synthesis ==
Gates' total synthesis of morphine provided a proof of the structure of morphine proposed by Robinson in 1925. This synthesis of morphine features one of the first examples of the Diels-Alder reaction in the context of total synthesis.

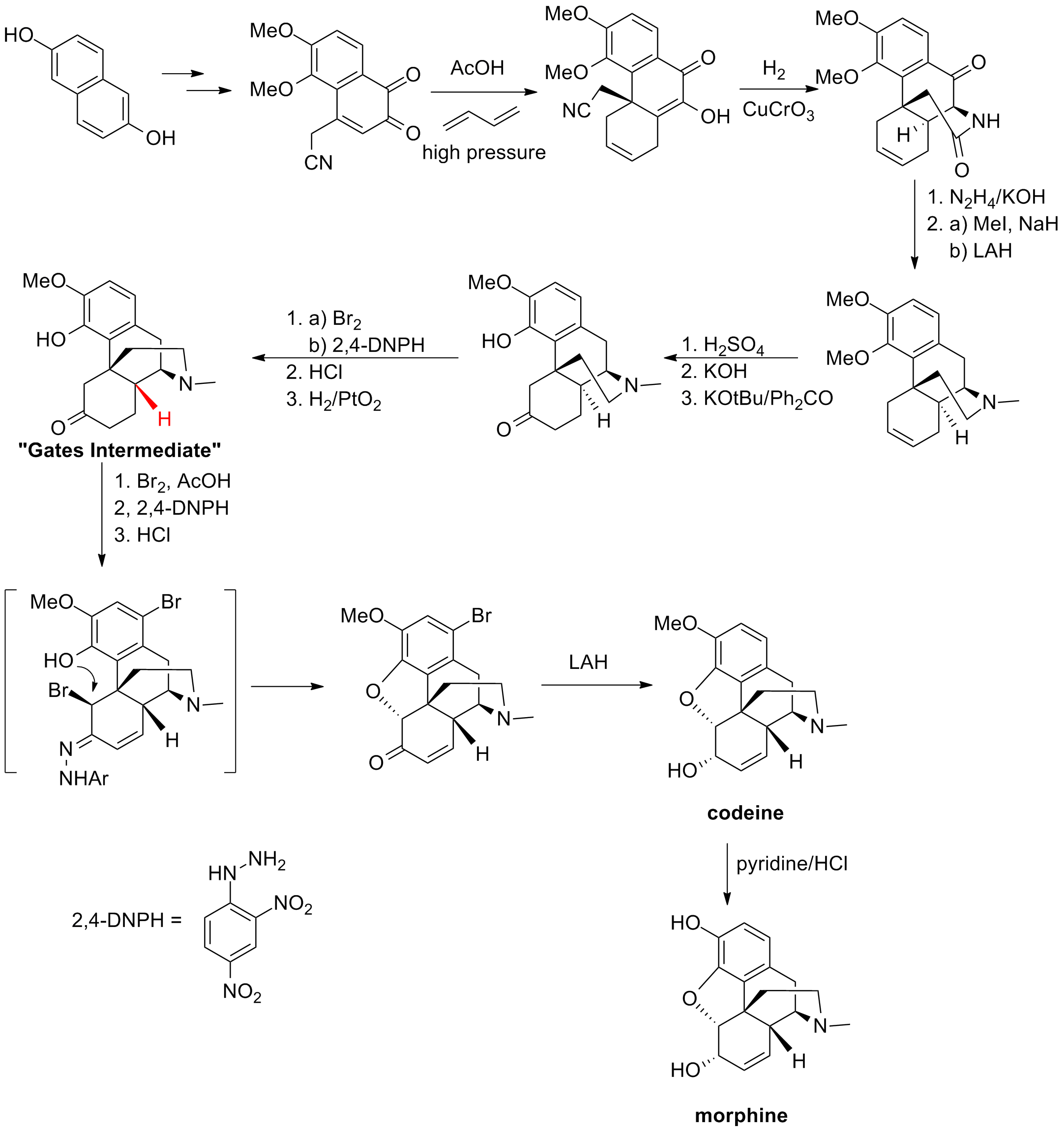

== Rice synthesis ==
The Rice synthesis follows a biomimetic route and is the most efficient reported to date. A key step is the Grewe cyclization that is analogous to the cyclization of reticuline that occurs in morphine biosynthesis.
