= Marshall D. Gates Jr. =

American chemist

- Born: 1915
- Died: 2003 (aged 87–88)
- Education: Rice University; Harvard University
- Known for: Total synthesis of morphine
- Scientific career
- Fields: Organic chemistry
- Workplaces: University of Rochester; Bryn Mawr College

Marshall D. Gates Jr. (1915–2003) was an American chemist, holding the position of C.F. Houghton Professor of Chemistry at the University of Rochester. He was an organic chemist whose research was in the field of natural product synthesis. He is best known for publishing the first total synthesis of morphine in 1952.

== Biography ==
Marshall Gates was born in 1915 in Boyne City, Michigan. He received his undergraduate training at Rice University and his masters and doctoral degrees from Harvard University. He married Martha L. Meyer with whom he had two sons and two daughters. From 1941 to 1949 he taught at Bryn Mawr College at which point he moved to the University of Rochester where he remained until his retirement in 1981. From 1943 to 1946 he did work for the National Defense Council and served as editor in chief of the Journal of the American Chemical Society from 1949 to 1969. In honor of his death in 2003, a named professorship was established at the University of Rochester Department of Chemistry.

== Morphine Total Synthesis ==
Gates's total synthesis of morphine was the first of its kind and an important confirmation of the structural determination made by Robert Robinson some 27 years prior. The synthesis was based on the construction of a cyanodiketone from the dihydroxynaphthalene shown below. The key step was a high-pressure Diels-Alder reaction with butadiene that established the fused ring system core. Reductive coupling between the hydroxyl and cyano groups furnished the ethylamine bridge and further elaboration (including an arduous epimerization of the highlighted stereocenter) established the so-called "Gates Intermediate." Syntheses published thereafter focused, for a time, on improvements to the synthesis of this intermediate as well as the final steps.

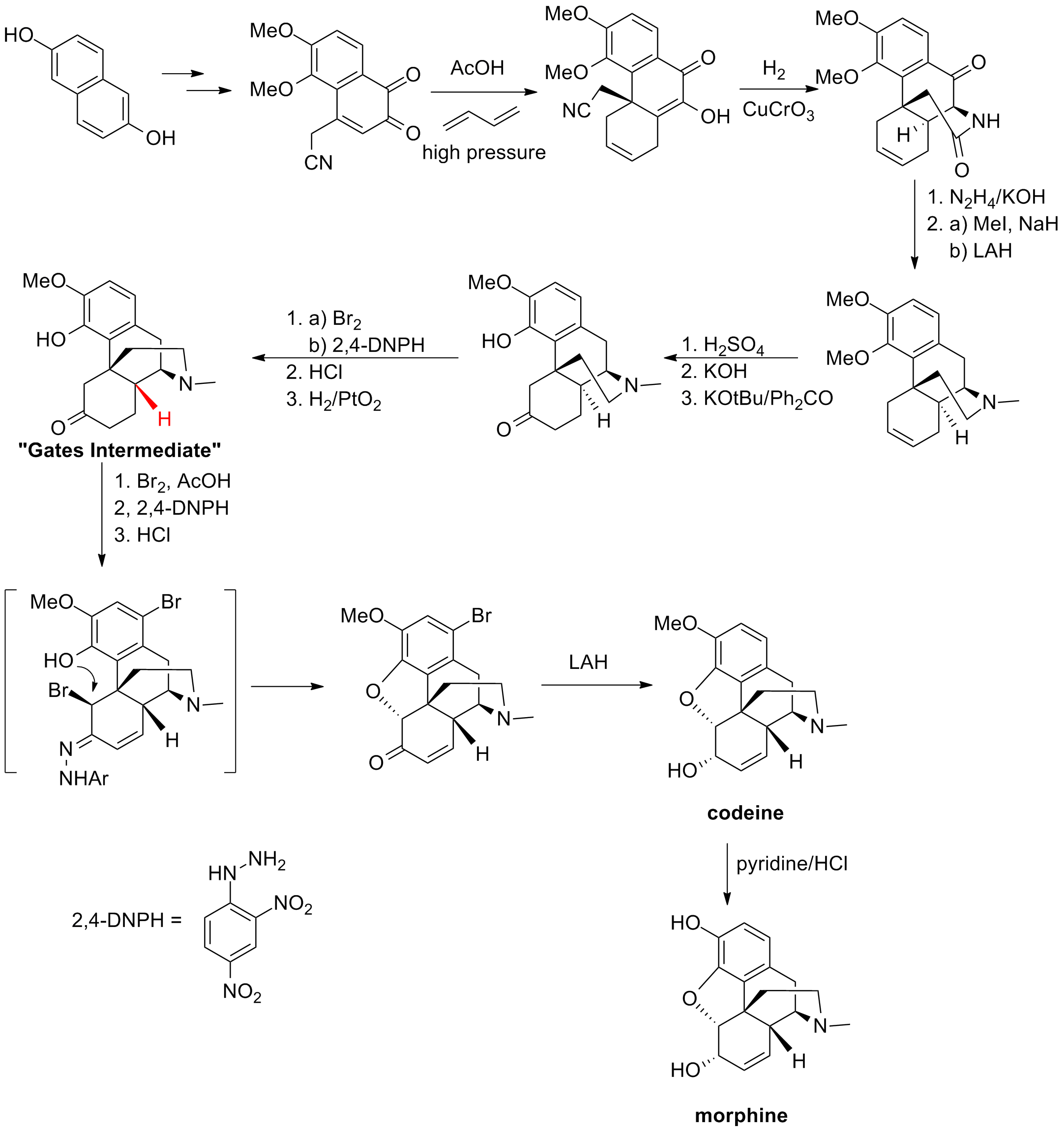
