= Salutaridinol =

Names
- IUPAC name 3,6-Dimethoxy-17-methyl-5,6,8,14-tetradehydromorphinan-4,7α-diol
- Other names 5,6,8,14-Tetradehydro-3,6-dimethoxy-17-methyl-morphinan-4,7-diol

Identifiers
CAS Number	3271-79-2
ChEBI	CHEBI:18373
ChEMBL	ChEMBL255882
ChemSpider	547235
KEGG	C05220
PubChem CID	5460042
- InChI: InChI=1S/C19H23NO4/c1-20-7-6-19-10-16(24-3)14(21)9-12(19)13(20)8-11-4-5-15(23-2)18(22)17(11)19/h4-5,9-10,13-14,21-22H,6-8H2,1-3H3/t13-,14+,19+/m1/s1 Key: LLSADFZHWMEBHH-TYILLQQXSA-N

Properties
Chemical formula	C_{19}H_{23}NO_{4}
Molar mass	329.396 g·mol^{−1}
- Except where otherwise noted, data are given for materials in their standard state (at 25 °C [77 °F], 100 kPa). Infobox references

Salutaridinol is a modified benzyltetrahydroisoquinoline alkaloid with the formula C_{19}H_{23}NO_{4}. It is produced in the secondary metabolism of the opium poppy Papaver somniferum (Papaveraceae) as an intermediate in the biosynthetic pathway that generates morphine. As an isoquinoline alkaloid, it is fundamentally derived from tyrosine as part of the shikimate pathway of secondary metabolism. Salutaridinol is a product of the enzyme salutaridine: NADPH 7-oxidoreductase and the substrate for the enzyme salutaridinol 7-O-acetyltransferase, which are two of the four enzymes in the morphine biosynthesis pathway that generates morphine from (R)-reticuline. Salutaridinol's unique position adjacent to two of the four enzymes in the morphine biosynthesis pathway gives it an important role in enzymatic, genetic, and synthetic biology studies of morphine biosynthesis. Salutaridinol levels are indicative of the flux through the morphine biosynthesis pathway and the efficacy of both salutaridine: NADPH 7-oxidoreductase and salutaridinol 7-O-acetyltransferase.

== History ==
Salutaridinol was first identified as an intermediate in the morphine biosynthesis pathway in the mid 1960s.

== Biosynthesis ==
In the morphine biosynthetic pathway, salutaridinol is derived in three steps from (R)-reticuline. First, (R)-reticuline undergoes an oxidation at each of its phenol rings mediated by the cytochrome P-450-dependent monooxygenase salutaridine synthase. These phenol group oxidations yield a diradical species that undergoes ortho coupling to the phenol group of the tetrahydroisoquinoline and para coupling to the benzyl group to create the salutaridinol precursor salutaridine. A stereospecific reduction of the salutaridine carbonyl group by salutaridine: NADPH 7-oxidoreductase then generates salutaridinol.

=== Downstream transformation to morphine ===
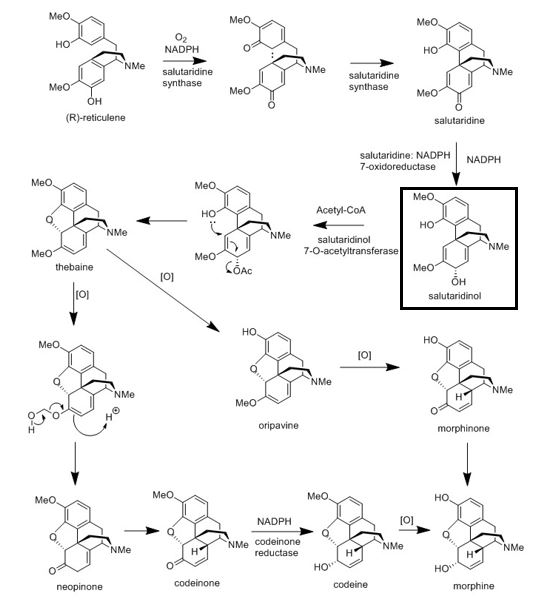
Morphine biosynthesis pathway with salutaridinol highlighted in the box

Salutaridinol can be converted in two reaction steps to the morphine precursor thebaine. The first step is an esterification of the hydroxyl group previously reduced in the conversion of salutaridine to salutaridinol with acetyl-CoA. This step is mediated by the enzyme salutaridinol 7-O-acetyltransferase. The second step is a ring closure achieved by a nucleophilic attack of the phenol group on the dienol system to generate an oxide bridge and kick out an acetate leaving group, giving thebaine. This second step does not require an enzyme. Thebaine can then be converted to morphine through two slightly different biosynthetic routes, one of which makes use of the fourth enzyme codeinone reductase.
