= Salutaridine reductase (NADPH) =

Enzyme

salutaridine: NADPH 7-oxidoreductase

Identifiers
- EC no.: 1.1.1.248
- CAS no.: 152743-95-8

Databases
- IntEnz: IntEnz view
- BRENDA: BRENDA entry
- ExPASy: NiceZyme view
- KEGG: KEGG entry
- MetaCyc: metabolic pathway
- PRIAM: profile
- PDB structures: RCSB PDB PDBe PDBsum
- Gene Ontology: AmiGO / QuickGO
Search
- PMC: articles
- PubMed: articles
- NCBI: proteins

In enzymology, salutaridine reductase (NADPH) (EC 1.1.1.248) is an enzyme that catalyzes the chemical reaction

salutaridine
+ NADPH
H^{+}
salutaridinol
+ NADP^{+}

The three substrates of this enzyme are salutaridine, reduced nicotinamide adenine dinucleotide phosphate (NADPH), and a proton. Its products are salutaridinol and oxidised NADPH^{+}. This conversion is part of the morphinan alkaloid pathway in Papaver somniferum.

The enzyme belongs to the family of oxidoreductases, specifically those acting on the CH-OH group of donor with NAD^{+} or NADP^{+} as acceptor. The systematic name of this enzyme class is salutaridinol:NADP^{+} 7-oxidoreductase.
