= Solpecainol =

Names
- Preferred IUPAC name (1R,2S)-2-{[(2S)-1-Phenoxypropan-2-yl]amino}-1-phenylpropane-1,3-diol

Identifiers
| CAS Number | 68567-30-6 |
| 3D model (JSmol) | Interactive image |
| ChEMBL | ChEMBL2375143 |
| ChemSpider | 2342303 |
| PubChem CID | 3085385 |
| UNII | 9MGJ6CCP6J |
| CompTox Dashboard (EPA) | DTXSID60218669 |
- InChI: InChI=1S/C18H23NO3/c1-14(13-22-16-10-6-3-7-11-16)19-17(12-20)18(21)15-8-4-2-5-9-15/h2-11,14,17-21H,12-13H2,1H3/t14-,17-,18+/m0/s1 Key: DQAFKLGCFBLEOM-JCGIZDLHSA-N
- SMILES: C[C@@H](COC1=CC=CC=C1)N[C@@H](CO)[C@H](O)C1=CC=CC=C1

Properties
| Chemical formula | C_{18}H_{23}NO_{3} |
| Molar mass | 301.386 g·mol^{−1} |
- Except where otherwise noted, data are given for materials in their standard state (at 25 °C [77 °F], 100 kPa). Infobox references

Solpecainol is an anti-anginal and anti-arrhythmic agent.
