= Salutaridine =

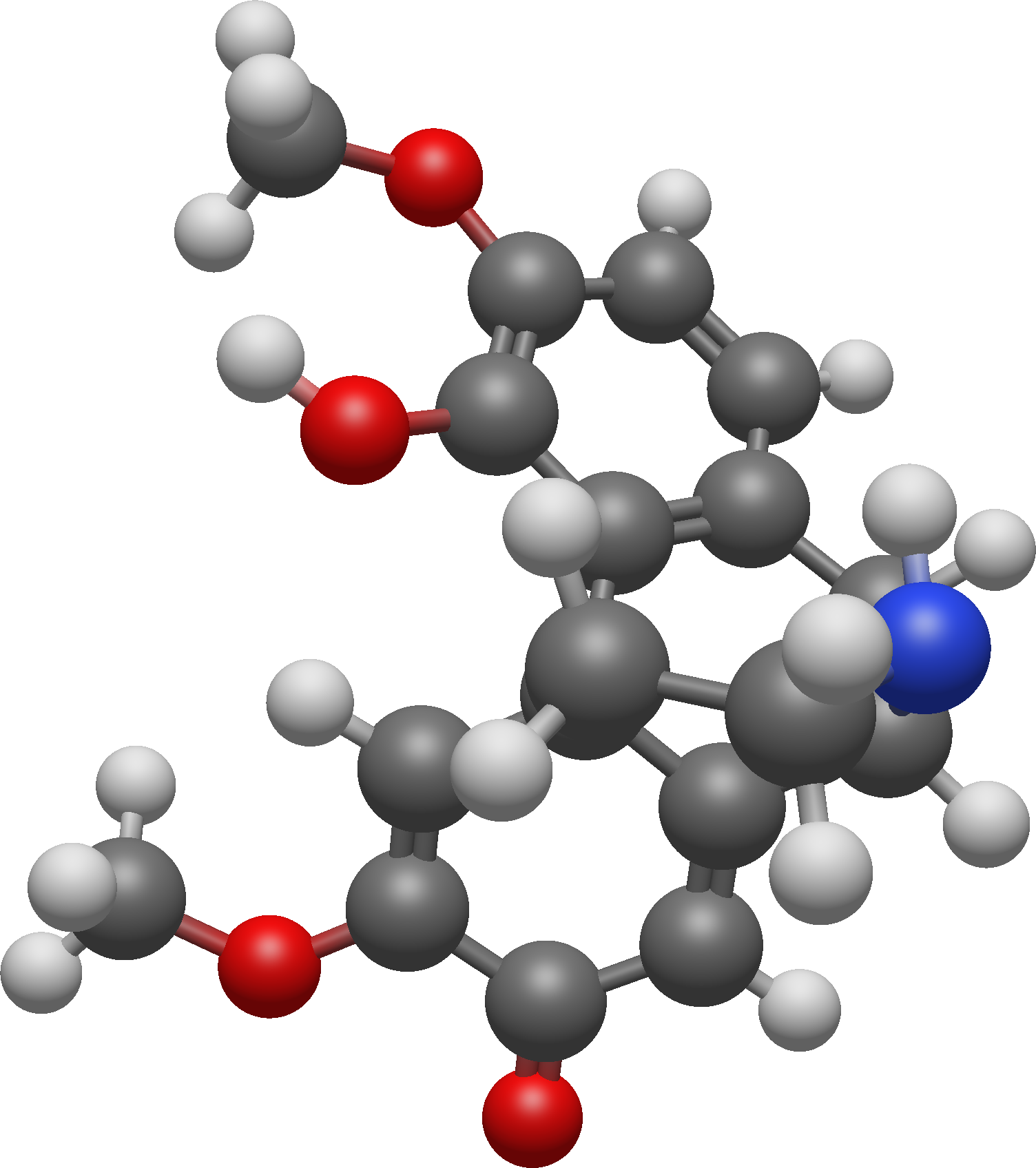

Names
- IUPAC name 4-Hydroxy-3,6-dimethoxy-17-methyl-5,6,8,14-tetradehydromorphinan-7-one
- Systematic IUPAC name (4aS,10R)-5-Hydroxy-3,6-dimethoxy-11-methyl-9,10-dihydro-2H-10,4a-(azanoethano)phenanthren-2-one

Identifiers
CAS Number	1936-18-1
3D model (JSmol)	Interactive image
ChEBI	CHEBI:17225
ChEMBL	ChEMBL404097
ChemSpider	16736005
KEGG	C05179
PubChem CID	5408233
UNII	7X10PRH74D
CompTox Dashboard (EPA)	DTXSID60941041
- InChI: InChI=1S/C19H21NO4/c1-20-7-6-19-10-16(24-3)14(21)9-12(19)13(20)8-11-4-5-15(23-2)18(22)17(11)19/h4-5,9-10,13,22H,6-8H2,1-3H3/t13-,19+/m1/s1 Key: GVTRUVGBZQJVTF-YJYMSZOUSA-N
- SMILES: CN1CC[C@]23C=C(C(=O)C=C2[C@H]1CC4=C3C(=C(C=C4)OC)O)OC

Properties
Chemical formula	C_{19}H_{21}NO_{4}
Molar mass	327.380 g·mol^{−1}
- Except where otherwise noted, data are given for materials in their standard state (at 25 °C [77 °F], 100 kPa). Infobox references

Salutaridine, also known as floripavine, is an alkaloid that is present in the morphinan alkaloid pathway of opium poppy, Papaver somniferum.

== Biosynthesis ==
It is produced by the enzyme salutaridine synthase that catalyzes the chemical reaction from its precursor (R)-reticuline:

(R)-reticuline
+ NADPH
O_{2}
2 H_{2}O
salutaridine
+ NADP^{+}

The enzyme uses reduced nicotinamide adenine dinucleotide phosphate (NADPH) as its cofactor.

Salutaridine is converted to salutaridinol by the enzyme salutaridine reductase (NADPH).

salutaridine
+ NADPH
H^{+}
salutaridinol
+ NADP^{+}
