= Isocodeine =

Names
- IUPAC name 3-Methoxy-17-methyl-7,8-didehydro-4,5α-epoxymorphinan-6β-ol
- Systematic IUPAC name (4R,4aR,7R,7aR,12bS)-9-Methoxy-3-methyl-2,3,4,4a,7,7a-hexahydro-1H-4,12-methano[1]benzofuro[3,2-e]isoquinolin-7-ol
- Other names 6-Isocodeine; α-Isocodeine

Identifiers
CAS Number	509-64-8
3D model (JSmol)	Interactive image
ChemSpider	4481821
ECHA InfoCard	100.007.366
EC Number	208-101-3
PubChem CID	5324288
UNII	XWN5Y2Y8ZQ
CompTox Dashboard (EPA)	DTXSID10858973
- InChI: InChI=1S/C18H21NO3/c1-19-8-7-18-11-4-5-13(20)17(18)22-16-14(21-2)6-3-10(15(16)18)9-12(11)19/h3-6,11-13,17,20H,7-9H2,1-2H3/t11-,12+,13+,17-,18-/m0/s1 Key: OROGSEYTTFOCAN-KEMUOJQUSA-N
- SMILES: O[C@@H]2\C=C/[C@H]5[C@@H]4N(CC[C@@]51c3c(O[C@H]12)c(OC)ccc3C4)C

Properties
Chemical formula	C_{18}H_{21}NO_{3}
Molar mass	299.370 g·mol^{−1}
Melting point	173 to 174 °C (343 to 345 °F; 446 to 447 K)

Hazards
- GHS labelling
Pictograms	(GHS06: Toxic) (GHS07: Exclamation mark)
Signal word	Danger
Hazard statements	H301, H302, H331
Precautionary statements	P261, P264, P270, P271, P301+P310, P301+P312, P304+P340, P311, P321, P330, P403+P233, P405, P501
- Except where otherwise noted, data are given for materials in their standard state (at 25 °C [77 °F], 100 kPa). Infobox references

Isocodeine is an opioid research chemical related to codeine. It is an epimer of codeine that can be prepared from codeine via a Mitsunobu reaction.

Dozens of derivatives and analogs of isocodeine and the related compound isomorphine have been produced. One of these, dihydroisocodeine is a pharmaceutical four times stronger than dihydrocodeine and thus six times stronger than codeine which was used more extensively in the past in Continental Europe and other locales. Other isomers of codeine include allocodeine, pseudocodeine, heterocodeine and substances with intermediate qualities such as pseudoallocodeine and formylallocodeine can be prepared in the laboratory.
