= Methyldihydromorphine =

Chemical compound

Clinical data
- ATC code: none

Legal status
- Legal status: BR: Class A1 (Narcotic drugs); CA: Schedule I; DE: Anlage I (Authorized scientific use only); US: Schedule I

Identifiers
- IUPAC name: (5α,6α)-6,17-Dimethyl-4,5-epoxymorphinan-3,6-diol
- CAS Number: 509-56-8
- PubChem CID: 5464303
- ChemSpider: 4576611
- UNII: 26AY9TLO5W
- KEGG: D12689
- CompTox Dashboard (EPA): DTXSID20228067

Chemical and physical data
- Formula: C_{18}H_{23}NO_{3}
- Molar mass: 301.386 g·mol^{−1}
- 3D model (JSmol): Interactive image
- SMILES: C[C@@]1(CC[C@H]2[C@H]3Cc4ccc(c5c4[C@]2([C@H]1O5)CCN3C)O)O
- InChI: InChI=1S/C18H23NO3/c1-17(21)6-5-11-12-9-10-3-4-13(20)15-14(10)18(11,16(17)22-15)7-8-19(12)2/h3-4,11-12,16,20-21H,5-9H2,1-2H3/t11-,12+,16-,17-,18-/m0/s1; Key:NBKVWIJQJMEQLE-NGTWOADLSA-N

Methyldihydromorphine is a semi-synthetic opioid originally developed in Germany in 1936, controlled under both domestic law and UN conventions because of its possible potential for abuse. Methyldihydromorphine is related to heterocodeine and is not a synonym for dihydrocodeine or dihydroheterocodeine (6-methoxydihydromorphine).

This compound is a derivative of hydromorphone It has been found to be 33 percent the analgesic potency of morphine with a substantially longer duration of action.

So far, little is currently known about this compound. It is a Schedule I controlled substance in the United States with an ACSCN of 9304 and a 2013 annual manufacturing quota of 2 grams.
