= Butopamine =

Clinical data
- Other names: LY-131126; (R,R)-Ractopamine
- Drug class: Sympathomimetic; β-Adrenergic receptor agonist; Positive inotrope; Positive chronotrope

Identifiers
- IUPAC name: 4-[(3R)-3-[[(2R)-2-hydroxy-2-(4-hydroxyphenyl)ethyl]amino]butyl]phenol
- CAS Number: 66734-12-1
- PubChem CID: 68556
- ChemSpider: 61830
- UNII: ZX7907IE2H
- KEGG: D03195
- ChEBI: CHEBI:82648
- ChEMBL: ChEMBL2103767
- CompTox Dashboard (EPA): DTXSID50216876

Chemical and physical data
- Formula: C_{18}H_{23}NO_{3}
- Molar mass: 301.386 g·mol^{−1}
- 3D model (JSmol): Interactive image
- SMILES: C[C@H](CCC1=CC=C(C=C1)O)NC[C@@H](C2=CC=C(C=C2)O)O
- InChI: InChI=1S/C18H23NO3/c1-13(2-3-14-4-8-16(20)9-5-14)19-12-18(22)15-6-10-17(21)11-7-15/h4-11,13,18-22H,2-3,12H2,1H3/t13-,18+/m1/s1; Key:YJQZYXCXBBCEAQ-ACJLOTCBSA-N

Butopamine (INN, USAN; developmental code name LY-131126; also known as (R,R)-ractopamine) is a sympathomimetic agent, β-adrenergic receptor agonist, and positive inotrope of the phenethylamine family which was studied for treatment of heart failure but was never marketed. It is an analogue of dobutamine and is the (R,R)-enantiomer of ractopamine. Butopamine is not a catecholamine and is resistant to metabolism by catechol O-methyltransferase (COMT). In contrast to dobutamine, butopamine is orally active. In addition to its positive inotropic effects, butopamine has positive chronotropic effects.
