= Codeinone reductase (NADPH) =

Enzyme

codeinone reductase (NADPH)

Identifiers
- EC no.: 1.1.1.247
- CAS no.: 153302-41-1

Databases
- IntEnz: IntEnz view
- BRENDA: BRENDA entry
- ExPASy: NiceZyme view
- KEGG: KEGG entry
- MetaCyc: metabolic pathway
- PRIAM: profile
- PDB structures: RCSB PDB PDBe PDBsum
- Gene Ontology: AmiGO / QuickGO
Search
- PMC: articles
- PubMed: articles
- NCBI: proteins

In enzymology, a codeinone reductase (NADPH) (EC 1.1.1.247) is an enzyme that catalyzes the chemical reaction

codeine + NADP^{+} $\rightleftharpoons$ codeinone + NADPH + H^{+}

Thus, the two substrates of this enzyme are codeine and NADP^{+}, whereas its 3 products are codeinone, NADPH, and H^{+}.

This enzyme belongs to the family of oxidoreductases, specifically those acting on the CH-OH group of donor with NAD^{+} or NADP^{+} as acceptor. The systematic name of this enzyme class is codeine:NADP^{+} oxidoreductase. This enzyme participates in alkaloid biosynthesis i.
