= Salutaridine synthase =

Class of enzymes

salutaridine synthase

Identifiers
- EC no.: 1.14.19.67
- CAS no.: 149433-84-1

Databases
- IntEnz: IntEnz view
- BRENDA: BRENDA entry
- ExPASy: NiceZyme view
- KEGG: KEGG entry
- MetaCyc: metabolic pathway
- PRIAM: profile
- PDB structures: RCSB PDB PDBe PDBsum
- Gene Ontology: AmiGO / QuickGO
Search
- PMC: articles
- PubMed: articles
- NCBI: proteins

In enzymology, salutaridine synthase (EC 1.14.19.67) is an enzyme that catalyzes the chemical reaction

(R)-reticuline
+ NADPH
O_{2}
2 H_{2}O
salutaridine
+ NADP^{+}

The three substrates of this enzyme are (R)-reticuline, reduced nicotinamide adenine dinucleotide phosphate (NADPH), and oxygen. Its products are the morphinan alkaloid salutaridine, oxidised NADP^{+}, and water.

This enzyme belongs to the family of oxidoreductases, specifically those acting on paired donors, with O2 as oxidant and incorporation or reduction of oxygen. The oxygen incorporated need not be derived from O2 with NADH or NADPH as one donor, and the other dehydrogenated. The systematic name of this enzyme class is (R)-reticuline,NADPH:oxygen oxidoreductase (C-C phenol-coupling). This enzyme is also called (R)-reticuline oxidase (C-C phenol-coupling). This enzyme participates in alkaloid biosynthesis.
