= Pseudocodeine =

Names
- Systematic IUPAC name (4R,4aR,5S,7aS,12bS)-9-methoxy-3-methyl-2,4,4a,5,7a,13-hexahydro-1H-4,12-methanobenzofuro[3,2-e]isoquinolin-5-ol
- Other names: Neoisocodeine; psi-Codeine

Identifiers
CAS Number	466-96-6
3D model (JSmol)	Interactive image
ChemSpider	4588983
ECHA InfoCard	100.006.711
PubChem CID	5486611
UNII	73786Q1Q4G
CompTox Dashboard (EPA)	DTXSID70963618
- InChI: InChI=1S/C18H21NO3/c1-19-8-7-18-14-6-4-12(20)16(18)11(19)9-10-3-5-13(21-2)17(22-14)15(10)18/h3-6,11-12,14,16,20H,7-9H2,1-2H3/t11-,12+,14+,16-,18-/m1/s1 Key: KYIVACLUFRUFLS-CVXFFHBFSA-N
- SMILES: CN1CC[C@]23[C@@H]4C=C[C@@H]([C@H]2[C@H]1CC5=C3C(=C(C=C5)OC)O4)O

Properties
Chemical formula	C_{18}H_{21}NO_{3}
Molar mass	299.370 g·mol^{−1}
Melting point	180 °C (356 °F; 453 K)

Hazards
- Lethal dose or concentration (LD, LC)
LD_{Lo} (lowest published)	1,783 mg kg^{−1} (subcutaneous, mouse)
- Except where otherwise noted, data are given for materials in their standard state (at 25 °C [77 °F], 100 kPa). Infobox references

Pseudocodeine is an isomer of codeine, once studied for its use as an analgesic. Like codeine, its neighbouring alkene and alcohol groups allow options for functionalisation.
