= Heterocodeine =

Chemical compound

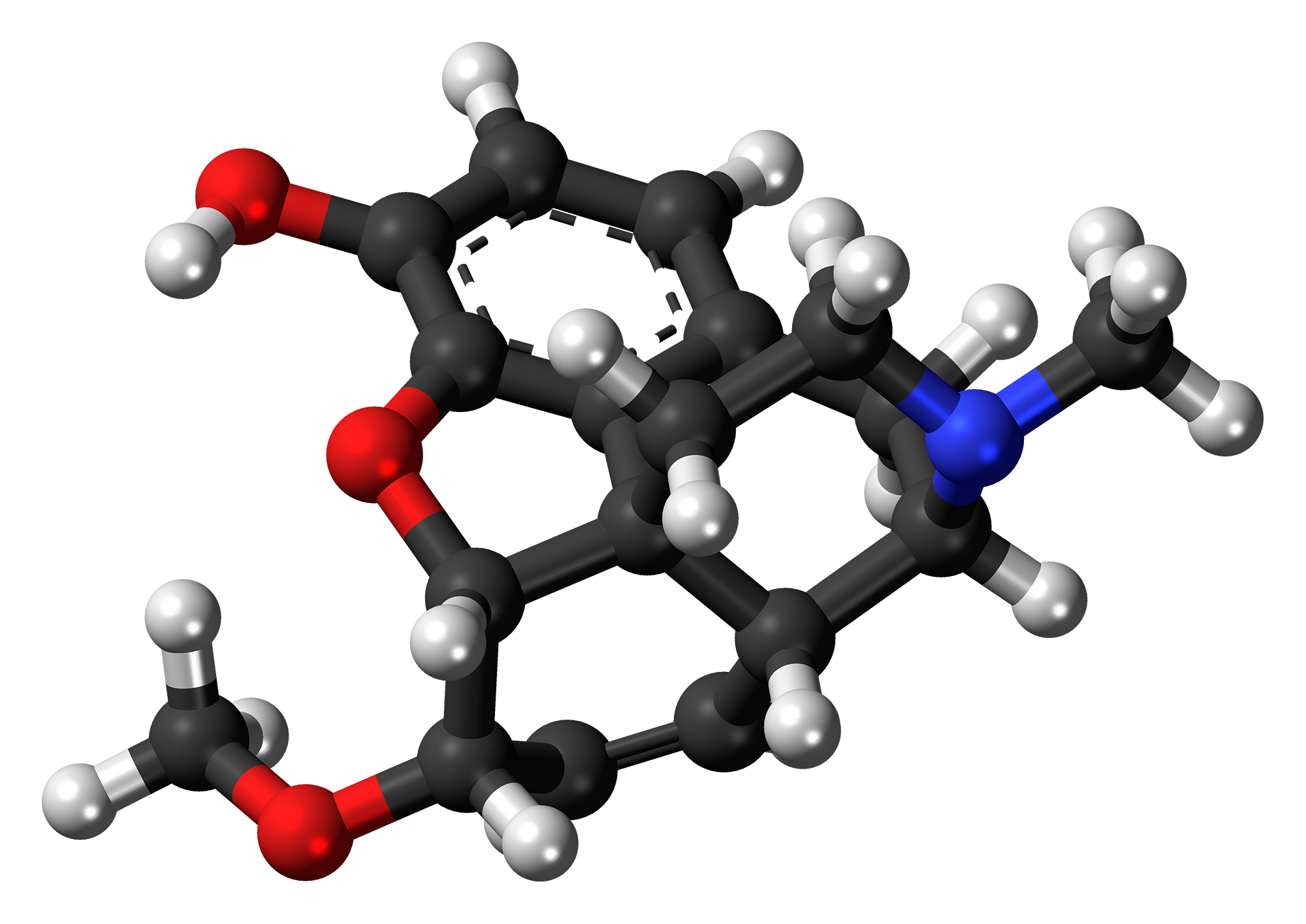

Clinical data
- Other names: Heterocodeine, Morphine 6-methyl ether
- ATC code: none

Legal status
- Legal status: US: Schedule II

Identifiers
- IUPAC name: (5α,6α)-6-Methoxy-17-methyl-7,8-didehydro-4,5-epoxymorphinan-3-ol
- CAS Number: 639-47-4
- PubChem CID: 5462505
- ChemSpider: 4575432
- UNII: SBO5K94K8L
- ChEMBL: ChEMBL358043
- CompTox Dashboard (EPA): DTXSID40905126
- ECHA InfoCard: 100.010.325

Chemical and physical data
- Formula: C_{18}H_{21}NO_{3}
- Molar mass: 299.370 g·mol^{−1}
- 3D model (JSmol): Interactive image
- SMILES: O(C)[C@H]2\C=C/[C@H]5[C@@H]4N(CC[C@@]51c3c(O[C@H]12)c(O)ccc3C4)C
- InChI: InChI=1S/C18H21NO3/c1-19-8-7-18-11-4-6-14(21-2)17(18)22-16-13(20)5-3-10(15(16)18)9-12(11)19/h3-6,11-12,14,17,20H,7-9H2,1-2H3/t11-,12+,14-,17-,18-/m0/s1; Key:FNAHUZTWOVOCTL-XSSYPUMDSA-N

Heterocodeine (6-methoxymorphine) is an opiate derivative, the 6-methyl ether of morphine, and a structural isomer of codeine; it is called "hetero-" because it is the reverse isomer of codeine. Heterocodeine was first synthesised in 1932 and first patented in 1935. It can be made from morphine by selective methylation. Codeine is the natural mono-methyl ether, but must be metabolized for activity (that is, it is a prodrug). In contrast the semi-synthetic mono-methyl ether, heterocodeine is a direct agonist. The 6,7,8,14 tetradehydro 3,6 methyl di-ether of morphine is thebaine.

Heterocodeine is 6 times more potent than morphine due to having a substitution at the 6-hydroxy position, in a similar manner to 6-acetylmorphine. The drug methyldihydromorphine (dihydroheterocodeine) is a derivative of heterocodeine. Like the morphine metabolite morphine-6-glucuronide, 6-position branches (esters or ethers) of morphine bind to the otherwise unagonized human mu receptor subtype mu-3 (or μ3); as well as the 6-acetylmorphine metabolite of heroin this includes heterocodeine.

The relative strength of heterocodeine to codeine has been published as 50, 72, 81, 88, 93, 96, and 108 ×.

It is not mentioned specifically in the Controlled Substances Act 1970 but is a Schedule II controlled substance as an analogue of morphinan or morphine under the morphine structure rules of the Analogues Act; in other countries it is usually controlled as a strong opioid.

Homocodeine is a synonym for pholcodine. Bicodeine is a dimer of codeine which is essentially the codeine analogue of pseudomorphine and is also known as pseudocodeine. It is an occasional component of opium and is also a decomposition product of codeine under certain circumstances.
