= 4-Fluoroisobutyrfentanyl =

Chemical compound

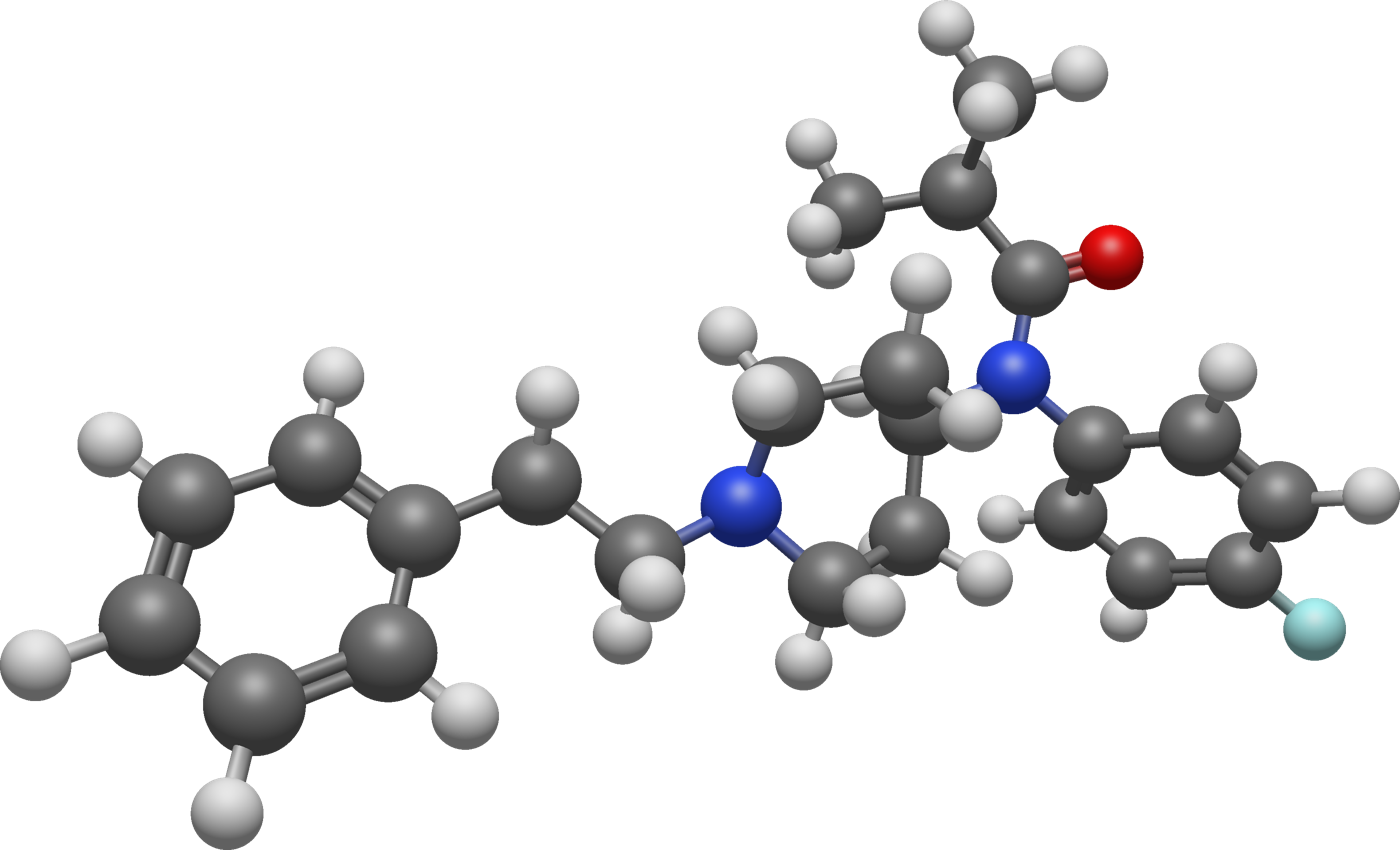

Legal status
- Legal status: BR: Class F1 (Prohibited narcotics); CA: Schedule I; DE: Anlage II (Authorized trade only, not prescriptible); UK: Class A; US: Schedule I

Identifiers
- IUPAC name: N-(4-Fluorophenyl)-N-[1-(2-phenylethyl)-4-piperidinyl]-isobutanamide
- CAS Number: 244195-32-2
- PubChem CID: 100974914
- ChemSpider: 71078977
- UNII: X9MBA0QE1I
- KEGG: C22768
- ChEBI: CHEBI:233683

Chemical and physical data
- Formula: C_{23}H_{29}FN_{2}O
- Molar mass: 368.496 g·mol^{−1}
- 3D model (JSmol): Interactive image
- SMILES: CC(C)C(=O)N(C1CCN(CC1)CCC2=CC=CC=C2)C3=CC=C(C=C3)F
- InChI: InChI=1S/C23H29FN2O/c1-18(2)23(27)26(21-10-8-20(24)9-11-21)22-13-16-25(17-14-22)15-12-19-6-4-3-5-7-19/h3-11,18,22H,12-17H2,1-2H3; Key:OZDOSQNUJIXEOR-UHFFFAOYSA-N

4-Fluoroisobutyrylfentanyl (also known as 4-FIBF and p-FIBF) is an opioid analgesic that is an analog of butyrfentanyl and structural isomer of 4-Fluorobutyrfentanyl and has been sold online as a designer drug. It is closely related to 4-fluorofentanyl, which has an EC_{50} value of 4.2 nM for the human μ-opioid receptor. 4-fluoroisobutyrylfentanyl is a highly selective μ-opioid receptor agonist whose analgesic potency is almost ten times of that reported for morphine.

== Side effects ==
Side effects of fentanyl analogs are similar to those of fentanyl itself, which include itching, nausea and potentially serious respiratory depression, which can be life-threatening. Fentanyl analogs have killed hundreds of people throughout Europe and the former Soviet republics since the most recent resurgence in use began in Estonia in the early 2000s, and novel derivatives continue to appear.

== Legality ==
4-Fluoroisobutyrylfentanyl is a Schedule I controlled substance in the United States. In the UK, it is a Class A drug. In Canada, it is a Schedule I drug.

== See also ==
- 3-Methylbutyrfentanyl
- 3-Methylfentanyl
- 4-Fluorofentanyl
- α-Methylfentanyl
- Acetylfentanyl
- Acrylfentanyl
- Furanylfentanyl
- List of fentanyl analogues
