= 4-Methoxybutyrfentanyl =

Opioid analgesic

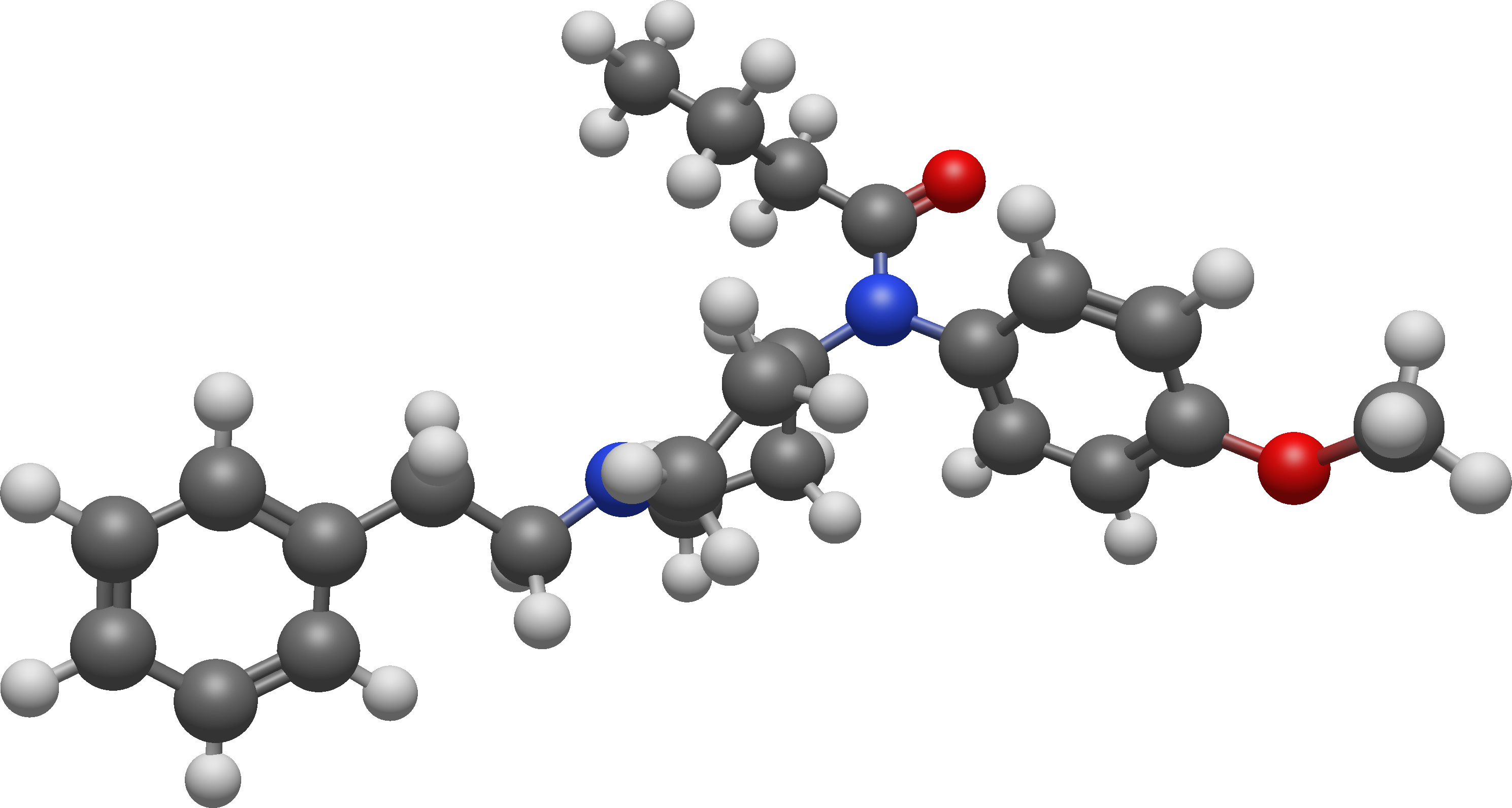

Clinical data
- Other names: para-Methoxybutyryl fentanyl

Legal status
- Legal status: CA: Schedule I; DE: NpSG (Industrial and scientific use only); UK: Class A; US: Schedule I; Illegal in Sweden

Identifiers
- IUPAC name: N-(4-Methoxyphenyl)-N-[1-(2-phenylethyl)-4-piperidinyl]-butanamide
- CAS Number: 2088842-68-4
- PubChem CID: 118796493
- ChemSpider: 52085457
- UNII: Y72Z69R7K3
- ChEBI: CHEBI:183351
- CompTox Dashboard (EPA): DTXSID401036781

Chemical and physical data
- Formula: C_{24}H_{32}N_{2}O_{2}
- Molar mass: 380.532 g·mol^{−1}
- 3D model (JSmol): Interactive image
- SMILES: CCCC(=O)N(C1CCN(CC1)CCc2ccccc2)c3ccc(OC)cc3
- InChI: InChI=1S/C24H32N2O2/c1-3-7-24(27)26(21-10-12-23(28-2)13-11-21)22-15-18-25(19-16-22)17-14-20-8-5-4-6-9-20/h4-6,8-13,22H,3,7,14-19H2,1-2H3; Key:FNVSEQCPMXWQKG-UHFFFAOYSA-N

4-Methoxybutyrfentanyl (also known as 4-MeO-BF) is an opioid analgesic that is an analog of butyrfentanyl and has been sold online as a designer drug.

== Side effects ==
Side effects of fentanyl analogs are similar to those of fentanyl itself, which include itching, nausea and potentially serious respiratory depression, which can be life-threatening. Fentanyl analogs have killed hundreds of people throughout Europe and the former Soviet republics since the most recent resurgence in use began in Estonia in the early 2000s, and novel derivatives continue to appear.

Life-threatening adverse reactions have been observed.

== Legal status ==
4-Methoxybutyrfentanyl is illegal in Sweden as of 26. January 2016.

4-Methoxybutyrfentanyl is a Schedule I controlled drug in the USA since 1. February 2018.

== See also ==
- 3-Methylbutyrfentanyl
- 3-Methylfentanyl
- 4-Fluorobutyrfentanyl
- α-Methylfentanyl
- Acetylfentanyl
- Furanylfentanyl
- List of fentanyl analogues
