= Acrylfentanyl =

Opioid analgesic

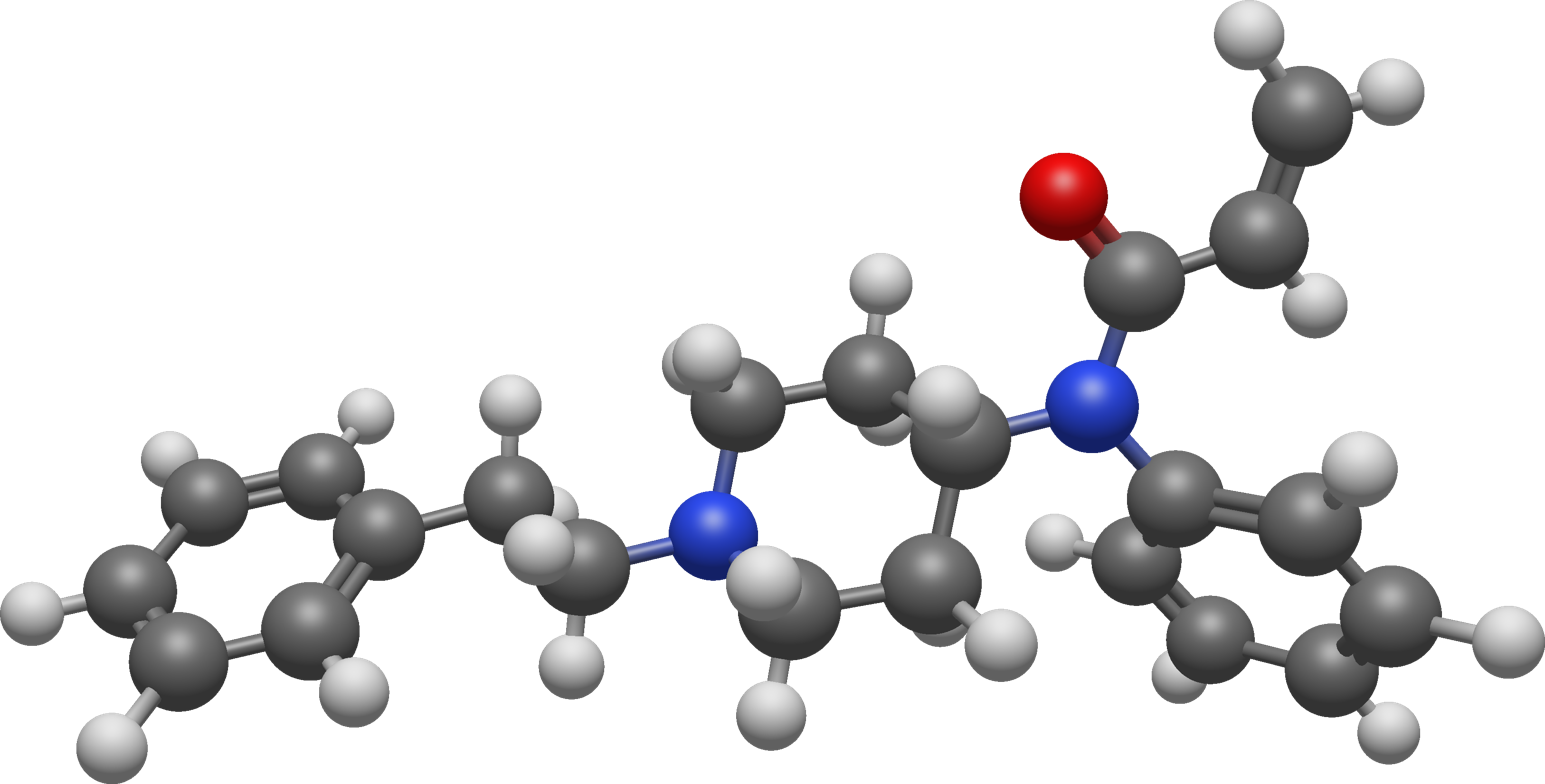

Clinical data
- ATC code: None

Legal status
- Legal status: BR: Class F1 (Prohibited narcotics); CA: Schedule I; DE: Anlage II (Authorized trade only, not prescriptible); UK: Class A; US: Schedule I; Illegal in Sweden

Identifiers
- IUPAC name: N-Phenyl-N-[1-(2-phenylethyl)piperidin-4-yl]prop-2-enamide
- CAS Number: 82003-75-6; HCl: 79279-03-1
- PubChem CID: 10314851; HCl: 12782338
- ChemSpider: 8490316; HCl: 24621155
- UNII: T64K7YD33B; HCl: QY70U25H9M
- KEGG: C22755
- ChEBI: CHEBI:233682
- ChEMBL: ChEMBL1196205; HCl: ChEMBL556159
- CompTox Dashboard (EPA): DTXSID701036742

Chemical and physical data
- Formula: C_{22}H_{26}N_{2}O
- Molar mass: 334.463 g·mol^{−1}
- 3D model (JSmol): Interactive image; HCl: Interactive image
- SMILES: C=CC(=O)N(c2ccccc2)C1CCN(CC1)CCc3ccccc3; HCl: C=CC(=O)N(c2ccccc2)C1CCN(CC1)CCc3ccccc3.Cl
- InChI: InChI=1S/C22H26N2O/c1-2-22(25)24(20-11-7-4-8-12-20)21-14-17-23(18-15-21)16-13-19-9-5-3-6-10-19/h2-12,21H,1,13-18H2; Key:RFQNLMWUIJJEQF-UHFFFAOYSA-N; HCl: InChI=1S/C22H26N2O.ClH/c1-2-22(25)24(20-11-7-4-8-12-20)21-14-17-23(18-15-21)16-13-19-9-5-3-6-10-19;/h2-12,21H,1,13-18H2;1H; Key:YUHNRLIKLNYPDD-UHFFFAOYSA-N

Acrylfentanyl (also known as acryloylfentanyl) is a highly potent opioid analgesic that is an analog of fentanyl and has been sold online as a designer drug. In animal studies the IC_{50} (the half maximal inhibitory concentration for acrylfentanyl to displace naloxone) is 1.4 nM, being slightly more potent than fentanyl itself (1.6 nM) as well as having a longer duration of action.

== Side effects ==
Side effects of fentanyl analogs are similar to those of fentanyl itself, which include itching, nausea and potentially serious respiratory depression, which can be life-threatening. Fentanyl analogs have killed hundreds of people throughout Europe and the former Soviet republics since the most recent resurgence in use began in Estonia in the early 2000s, and novel derivatives continue to appear.

As acrylamide derivatives are often used in drug discovery to make covalent inhibitors which will bind irreversibly to its target, acrylfentanyl is claimed to be naloxone resistant. However, acute intoxications with acrylfentanyl on mice treated by naloxone (2 mg/kg) have shown that acrylfentanyl could be displaced from the opioid receptor.

Acrylfentanyl has been linked to 20 deaths in Sweden as well as two deaths in Denmark in summer 2016.

== Legal status ==
Acrylfentanyl is a Schedule I controlled substance in the United States. As of 16 August 2016, it is an illegal medicine in Sweden.

== See also ==
- 3-Methylbutyrfentanyl
- 4-Fluorobutyrfentanyl
- 4-Methoxybutyrfentanyl
- Acetylfentanyl
- Butyrfentanyl
- Furanylfentanyl
- List of fentanyl analogues
