= C23H29FN2O =

The molecular formula C_{23}H_{29}FN_{2}O may refer to:

- 4-Fluorobutyrfentanyl, opioid analgesic and analog of butyrfentanyl; has been sold online as a designer drug
- 4-Fluoroisobutyrfentanyl, opioid analgesic, analog of butyrfentanyl, and structural isomer of 4-Fluorobutyrfentanyl; has been sold online as a designer drug
- XEN1101, an experimental anticonvulsant drug
