= 3-Allylfentanyl =

Opioid analgesic

Legal status
- Legal status: US: Schedule I

Identifiers
- IUPAC name: N-[(3S,4R)-1-Phenethyl-3-prop-2-enylpiperidin-4-yl]-N-phenylpropanamide
- CAS Number: 86151-80-6
- PubChem CID: 133866
- ChemSpider: 118047
- UNII: V990X77S2I

Chemical and physical data
- Formula: C_{25}H_{32}N_{2}O
- Molar mass: 376.544 g·mol^{−1}
- 3D model (JSmol): Interactive image
- SMILES: O=C(N(c1ccccc1)[C@@H]3CCN(CCc2ccccc2)C[C@@H]3C\C=C)CC
- InChI: InChI=1S/C25H32N2O/c1-3-11-22-20-26(18-16-21-12-7-5-8-13-21)19-17-24(22)27(25(28)4-2)23-14-9-6-10-15-23/h3,5-10,12-15,22,24H,1,4,11,16-20H2,2H3/t22-,24+/m0/s1; Key:BZXKQFFMDLTPJL-LADGPHEKSA-N

3-Allylfentanyl is an opioid analgesic that is an analogue of fentanyl.

3-Allylfentanyl has effects similar to fentanyl, although it is only 0.13x-0.14x as potent by weight.

The decreased potency of this analogue caused by the addition of the allyl group makes it somewhat less dangerous than fentanyl itself (ED50(rat) of 80μg/kg vs 11μg/kg for fentanyl), although this is relative. For comparison, carfentanil is at least 20-30x as potent as fentanyl.

== Side Effects ==
Side effects of fentanyl analogs vary based on strength and are similar to those of fentanyl itself, which include itching, nausea and potentially serious respiratory depression, which can be life-threatening.

== See also ==
- 3-Methylbutyrfentanyl
- 4-Fluorofentanyl
- α-Methylfentanyl
- Acetylfentanyl
- Butyrfentanyl
- List of fentanyl analogues
