= Β-Hydroxythiofentanyl =

Opioid analgesic drug

β-Hydroxythiofentanyl

Clinical data
- ATC code: none

Legal status
- Legal status: CA: Schedule I; UK: Class A; US: Schedule I

Identifiers
- IUPAC name: N-{1-[2-Hydroxy-2-(thiophen-2-yl)ethyl]piperidin-4-yl}-N-phenylpropanamide
- CAS Number: 1474-34-6
- PubChem CID: 62278
- ChemSpider: 21106268
- UNII: MG6JW60TUG
- CompTox Dashboard (EPA): DTXSID101014172

Chemical and physical data
- Formula: C_{20}H_{26}N_{2}O_{2}S
- Molar mass: 358.50 g·mol^{−1}
- 3D model (JSmol): Interactive image
- SMILES: CCC(=O)N(c1ccccc1)C2CCN(CC2)CC(c3cccs3)O
- InChI: InChI=1S/C20H26N2O2S/c1-2-20(24)22(16-7-4-3-5-8-16)17-10-12-21(13-11-17)15-18(23)19-9-6-14-25-19/h3-9,14,17-18,23H,2,10-13,15H2,1H3; Key:GLAAETOTOUGGSB-UHFFFAOYSA-N

β-Hydroxythiofentanyl (beta-hydroxythiofentanyl) is an opioid analgesic that is an analog of fentanyl and thiofentanyl.

β-Hydroxythiofentanyl was sold briefly on the black market from around 1985, before the introduction of the Federal Analog Act in 1986 which for the first time attempted to control entire families of drugs based on their structural similarity rather than scheduling each drug individually as they appeared. β-hydroxythiofentanyl was anecdotally said to be one of the more favored fentanyl analogs by opiate addicts.

== Side Effects ==
β-Hydroxythiofentanyl has effects and side effects similar to fentanyl. Side effects of fentanyl analogs include itching, nausea and potentially serious respiratory depression, which can be life-threatening.

== Legal status ==
As of October 2015, β-hydroxythiofentanyl is a controlled substance in China.

As of May 2016, β-hydroxythiofentanyl was temporarily listed as a Schedule I controlled substance in the United States. A final ruling placing it in Schedule I was issued by the DEA on May 8, 2019 after a 1 year notice of proposed permanent scheduling. There were no petitions for hearings on the matter.

== See also ==
- Sufentanil
- Thiafentanil
