= C28H32N2O =

The molecular formula C_{28}H_{32}N_{2}O (molar mass: 412.57 g/mol, exact mass: 412.2515 u) may refer to:

- 3-Phenylpropanoylfentanyl
- 4-Phenylfentanyl
