= 3-Phenylpropanoylfentanyl =

Opioid analgesic

Legal status
- Legal status: US: Schedule I; Illegal in Sweden, Finland, and Lithuania

Identifiers
- IUPAC name: N-Phenyl-N-[1-(2-phenylethyl)piperidin-4-yl]-3-phenylpropanamide
- CAS Number: 79279-02-0
- PubChem CID: 137700126
- ChemSpider: 68003792
- UNII: 7VB55DZ638

Chemical and physical data
- Formula: C_{28}H_{32}N_{2}O
- Molar mass: 412.577 g·mol^{−1}
- 3D model (JSmol): Interactive image
- SMILES: c2ccccc2CCN1CCC(CC1)N(c3ccccc3)C(=O)CCc4ccccc4
- InChI: InChI=1S/C28H32N2O/c31-28(17-16-24-10-4-1-5-11-24)30(26-14-8-3-9-15-26)27-19-22-29(23-20-27)21-18-25-12-6-2-7-13-25/h1-15,27H,16-23H2; Key:DIRAGWDYMRIDIO-UHFFFAOYSA-N

3-Phenylpropanoylfentanyl (β'-phenylfentanyl) is an opioid analgesic that is an analog of fentanyl, which was invented in 1981, and has been sold as a designer drug, first identified in March 2017 in Sweden.

== Side effects ==
Side effects of fentanyl analogs are similar to those of fentanyl itself, which include itching, nausea and potentially serious respiratory depression, which can be life-threatening. Fentanyl analogs have killed hundreds of people throughout Europe and the former Soviet republics since the most recent resurgence in use began in Estonia in the early 2000s, and novel derivatives continue to appear. A new wave of fentanyl analogues and associated deaths began in around 2014 in the US, and have continued to grow in prevalence. Since 2016 these drugs have been responsible for hundreds of overdose deaths every week.

== Legal status ==
3-Phenylpropanoylfentanyl was banned in Finland in September 2017, and in Sweden in October 2017. It was also banned in Lithuania in 2017. Banned in United States on April 27, 2021 (schedule 1 of the Controlled Substances Act).

== See also ==
- Butyrfentanyl
- Benzoylfentanyl
- List of fentanyl analogues
