= Parafluorofuranylfentanyl =

Chemical compound

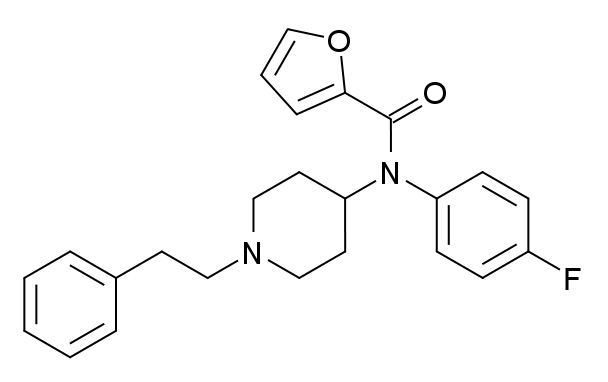

Legal status
- Legal status: US: Schedule I

Identifiers
- IUPAC name: N-(4-fluorophenyl)-N-[1-(2-phenylethyl)piperidin-4-yl]furan-2-carboxamide
- CAS Number: 1802489-71-9
- PubChem CID: 91825762
- ChemSpider: 44211060
- UNII: FD4PG6KRQ8
- CompTox Dashboard (EPA): DTXSID301018394

Chemical and physical data
- Formula: C_{24}H_{25}FN_{2}O_{2}
- Molar mass: 392.474 g·mol^{−1}
- 3D model (JSmol): Interactive image
- SMILES: C1CN(CCC1N(C2=CC=C(C=C2)F)C(=O)C3=CC=CO3)CCC4=CC=CC=C4
- InChI: InChI=1S/C24H25FN2O2/c25-20-8-10-21(11-9-20)27(24(28)23-7-4-18-29-23)22-13-16-26(17-14-22)15-12-19-5-2-1-3-6-19/h1-11,18,22H,12-17H2; Key:MGEQOAJOFFXWTR-UHFFFAOYSA-N

para-Fluorofuranylfentanyl (FFF, p-F-Fu-F) is an opioid analgesic that is an analog of fentanyl and has been sold as a designer drug. As with other fentanyl analogues, parafluorofuranylfentanyl has significant side effects including itching, nausea and potentially serious respiratory depression, which can be life-threatening, and it has been linked to numerous deaths from overdose. It falls within the definition of Schedule I drugs in the USA under federal drug analogue legislation, and is specifically listed as a Schedule I drug in North Dakota.

== See also ==
- Furanylfentanyl
- Parafluorofentanyl
- List of fentanyl analogues
