= C24H30N2O2 =

The molecular formula C_{24}H_{30}N_{2}O_{2} (molar mass: 378.51 g/mol) may refer to:

- Desmethylmoramide
- Doxapram
- Tetrahydrofuranylfentanyl
