= C27H28N2O3 =

The molecular formula C_{27}H_{28}N_{2}O_{3} (molar mass: 428.52 g/mol, exact mass: 428.2100 u) may refer to:

- AdipoRon
- Benzodioxolefentanyl
