= Cyclopentylfentanyl =

Opioid analgesic

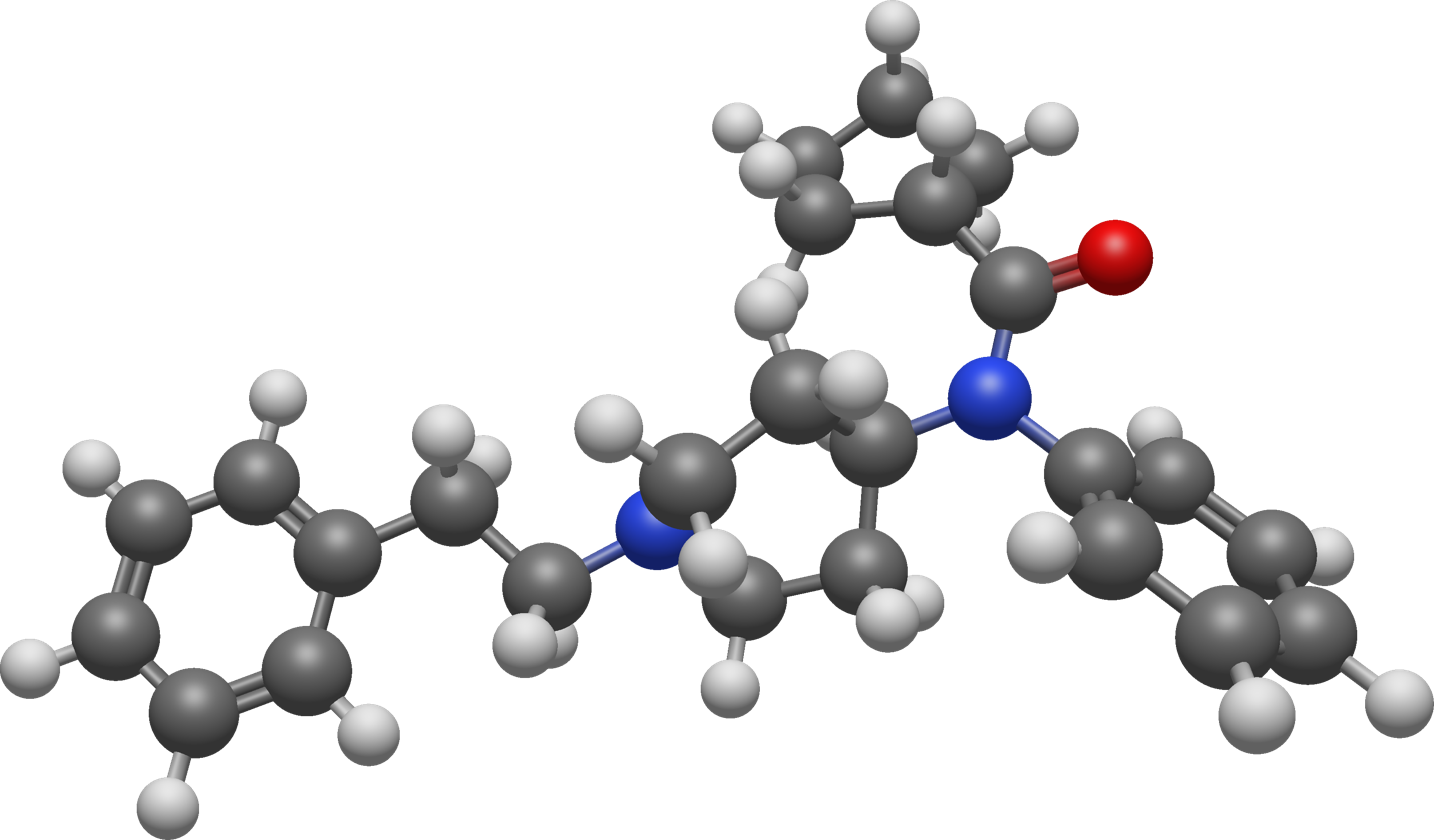

Legal status
- Legal status: CA: Schedule I; DE: NpSG (Industrial and scientific use only); UK: Class A; US: Schedule I; Illegal in Sweden

Identifiers
- IUPAC name: N-phenyl-N-[1-(2-phenylethyl)piperidin-4-yl]cyclopentanecarboxamide
- CAS Number: 2088918-01-6
- PubChem CID: 126682248
- ChemSpider: 81367208
- UNII: 79NY29L78C
- CompTox Dashboard (EPA): DTXSID801036783

Chemical and physical data
- Formula: C_{25}H_{32}N_{2}O
- Molar mass: 376.544 g·mol^{−1}
- 3D model (JSmol): Interactive image
- SMILES: C1CCC(C1)C(=O)N(C2CCN(CC2)CCC3=CC=CC=C3)C4=CC=CC=C4
- InChI: InChI=1S/C25H32N2O/c28-25(22-11-7-8-12-22)27(23-13-5-2-6-14-23)24-16-19-26(20-17-24)18-15-21-9-3-1-4-10-21/h1-6,9-10,13-14,22,24H,7-8,11-12,15-20H2; Key:PEASFKSPITUZGT-UHFFFAOYSA-N

Cyclopentylfentanyl is an opioid analgesic that is an analog of fentanyl and has been sold online as a designer drug, mainly in Sweden and other Scandinavian countries.

== Side effects ==
Side effects of fentanyl analogs are similar to those of fentanyl itself, which include itching, nausea and potentially serious respiratory depression, which can be life-threatening. Fentanyl analogs have killed hundreds of people throughout Europe and the former Soviet republics since the most recent resurgence in use began in Estonia in the early 2000s, and novel derivatives continue to appear. A new wave of fentanyl analogues and associated deaths began in around 2014 in the US, and have continued to grow in prevalence; especially since 2016 these drugs have been responsible for hundreds of overdose deaths every week.

== Legal status ==
Cyclopentylfentanyl was made illegal in Sweden in January 2017.

Cyclopentylfentanyl is a Schedule I controlled drug in the USA since 1 February 2018.

== See also ==
- Acetylfentanyl
- Butyrfentanyl
- Cyclopropylfentanyl
- Furanylfentanyl
- List of fentanyl analogues
