= List of fentanyl analogues =

Comprehensive list of compounds structurally related to fentanyl

The following is a list of fentanyl analogues (sometimes referred to as fentalogs), and includes both compounds developed by pharmaceutical companies for legitimate medical use, and those which have been sold as designer drugs. The latter have been reported to national drug control agencies such as the DEA, and some to transnational agencies such as the EMCDDA and UNODC. This is not a comprehensive or exhaustive list of fentanyl analogues, as more than 1400 compounds from this family have been described in the scientific and patent literature. However, this list does include many notable compounds that have reached late-stage human clinical trials, and compounds which have been sold as designer drugs, as well as representative examples of significant structural variations reported in the scientific and patent literature. The structural variations among fentanyl analogues can impart profound pharmacological differences between each other, especially regarding potency and efficacy.

In the United States, the Drug Enforcement Administration (DEA) placed the class of "Fentanyl-Related Substances" on the list of Schedule I drugs in 2018, making it illegal to manufacture, distribute, or possess fentanyl analogs, with very broad terminology being used in its scheduling. Regarding the temporary control of fentanyl-related substances, Schedule I was extended through December 31, 2024 by Public Law 117-328.

The chemical structure of fentanyl has been used as a basis in modern chemistry for the discovery and nomenclature of many new fentanyl analogues, sometimes called fentalogs. (Note: Cayman Chemical Company instead recommends using the 2'-, 3'-, 4'- locants to refer to non-aniline phenyl group positions, restricting use of the ortho-, meta-, para- locants to aniline ring positions.)

== Chemical structures of various fentanyl analogues ==
Structure	Name	Chemical name	CAS #
	ortho-Fluoroacrylfentanyl	N-(2-Fluorophenyl)-N-[1-(2-phenylethyl)-4-piperidinyl]-propen-2-amide	2309383-09-1
	ortho-Fluorobutyrylfentanyl (o-FBF)	N-(2-Fluorophenyl)-N-[1-(2-phenylethyl)-4-piperidinyl]-butanamide	2163847-76-3
	ortho-Fluoroisobutyrylfentanyl (o-FIBF)	N-(2-Fluorophenyl)-N-[1-(2-phenylethyl)-4-piperidinyl]-2-methylpropanamide	2351142-33-9
	ortho-Methylacetylfentanyl (o-MAF)	N-(2-Methylphenyl)-N-[1-(2-phenylethyl)-4-piperidinyl]-acetamide	90736-11-1
	ortho-Methylmethoxyacetylfentanyl	N-(2-Methylphenyl)-N-[1-(2-phenylethyl)-4-piperidinyl]-2-methoxyacetamide	2748485-22-3
	2,5-Dimethylfentanyl	N-[2,5-Dimethyl-1-(2-phenylethyl)piperidin-4-yl]-N-phenylpropanamide	42045-97-6
	2,2'-Difluorofentanyl (2'-fluoro ortho-fluorofentanyl)	N-(2-Fluorophenyl)-N-[1-(2-[2-fluorophenyl]ethyl)-4-piperidinyl]-propanamide	2748343-87-3
	3-Allylfentanyl	N-[(3S,4R)-1-Phenethyl-3-prop-2-enylpiperidin-4-yl]-N-phenylpropanamide	82208-84-2
	3-Fluorofentanyl (NFEPP)	N-(3-Fluoro-1-phenethylpiperidin-4-yl)-N-phenylpropionamide	1422952-84-8
	(3-Furanyl)fentanyl (3FUF)	N-Phenyl-N-[1-(2-phenylethyl)piperidin-4-yl]furan-3-carboxamide	101343-82-2
	3-Methylbutyrfentanyl (3-Methylbutyrylfentanyl)	N-[3-Methyl-1-(2-phenylethyl)piperidin-4-yl]-N-phenylbutanamide	97605-09-9
	3-Methylcrotonylfentanyl	N-Phenyl-N-[1-(2-phenylethyl)-4-(3-methylpiperidin-1-yl)]-2-butenamide	144480-29-5
	p-Methylcrotonylfentanyl	N-(4-methylphenyl)-N-[1-(2-phenylethyl)-4-(piperidin-1-yl)]-2-butenamide	2734344-10-4
	3-Methylfentanyl (3-MF)	N-(3-methyl-1-phenethyl-4-piperidyl)-N-phenyl-propanamide	42045-86-3
	3-Methylfuranylfentanyl (3MFUF, TMFUF)	N-Phenyl-N-[3-methyl-1-(2-phenylethyl)piperidin-4-yl]furan-2-carboxamide	
	3-Methylthiofentanyl	N-{3-Methyl-1-[2-(2-thienyl)ethyl]piperidin-4-yl}-N-phenylpropanamide	86052-04-2
	3-Phenylpropanoylfentanyl (β'-Phenyl fentanyl)	N-Phenyl-N-[1-(2-phenylethyl)piperidin-4-yl]-3-phenylpropanamide	79279-02-0
	4-Fluorobutyrfentanyl (para-Fluorobutyryl fentanyl, p-FBF)	N-(4-Fluorophenyl)-N-[1-(2-phenylethyl)-4-piperidinyl]-butanamide	244195-31-1
	4-Chloroisobutyrylfentanyl (para-Chloroisobutyryl fentanyl, 4-CIBF)	2-Methyl-N-(4-chlorophenyl)-N-[1-(1-phenylpropan-2-yl)piperidin-4-yl]propanamide	244195-34-4
	4-Fluoroisobutyrfentanyl (para-Fluoroisobutyryl fentanyl, 4-FIBF)	N-(4-Fluorophenyl)-N-[1-(2-phenylethyl)-4-piperidinyl]-isobutanamide	244195-32-2
	Parafluorofentanyl	N-(4-fluorophenyl)-N-[1-(2-phenylethyl)piperidin-4-yl]propanamide	90736-23-5
	Paramethylfentanyl (p-MF)	N-(4-methylphenyl)-N-[1-(2-phenylethyl)piperidin-4-yl]propanamide	1838-67-1
	para-fluorofuranylfentanyl (p-F-Fu-F)	N-(1-phenethylpiperidin-4-yl)-N-(4-fluorophenyl)furan-2-carboxamide	1802489-71-9
	para-chlorofuranylfentanyl (p-Cl-Fu-F)	N-(1-phenethylpiperidin-4-yl)-N-(4-chlorophenyl)furan-2-carboxamide	
	ortho-methylfuranylfentanyl (o-Me-Fu-F)	N-(1-phenethylpiperidin-4-yl)-N-(o-tolyl)furan-2-carboxamide	2309383-07-9
	ortho-methoxyfuranylfentanyl (o-MeO-Fu-F)	N-(1-phenethylpiperidin-4-yl)-N-(2-methoxyphenyl)furan-2-carboxamide	101343-50-4
	ortho-isopropylfuranylfentanyl (o-iPr-Fu-F)	N-(1-phenethylpiperidin-4-yl)-N-(2-isopropylphenyl)furan-2-carboxamide	
	4-Phenylfentanyl	N-Phenyl-N-[4-phenyl-1-(2-phenylethyl)piperidin-4-yl]propanamide	120448-97-7
	4-Methoxybutyrfentanyl (para-Methoxy butyryl fentanyl)	N-(4-Methoxyphenyl)-N-[1-(2-phenylethyl)-4-piperidinyl]-butanamide	2088842-68-4
	para-Hydroxy‐butyrylfentanyl	N-(4-hydroxyphenyl)-N-[1-(2-phenylethyl)-4-piperidinyl]-butanamide	
	4"-Fluorofentanyl	N-[1-[2-(4-Fluorophenyl)ethyl]-4-piperidinyl]-N-phenylpropanamide	2748343-99-7
	4"-Fluoro-o-fluoro-3-methylfentanyl	N-(2-fluorophenyl)-N-[1-[2-(4-fluorophenyl)ethyl]-3-methylpiperidin-4-yl]propanamide	
	4-Methyl-methoxyacetylfentanyl (para-Methyl methoxyacetyl fentanyl, 4-Me-MAF)	N-(4-Methylphenyl)-N-[1-(2-phenylethyl)-4-piperidinyl]-2-methoxyacetamide	
	4-Methylphenethylacetylfentanyl (4'-Methyl acetyl fentanyl)	N-[1-[2-(4-Methylphenyl)ethyl]-4-piperidinyl]-N-phenylacetamide	1071703-95-1
	Acrylfentanyl	N-Phenyl-N-[1-(2-phenylethyl)piperidin-4-yl]prop-2-enamide	82003-75-6
	α-Methylacetylfentanyl	N-Phenyl-N-[1-(1-phenylpropan-2-yl)-4-piperidyl]acetamide	101860-00-8
	α-Methylbutyrfentanyl	N-phenyl-N-[1-(1-phenylpropan-2-yl)-4-piperidyl]butanamide	244195-36-6
	α-Methylfentanyl (AMF)	N-phenyl-N-[1-(1-phenylpropan-2-yl)-4-piperidyl]propanamide	79704-88-4
	α-Methylthiofentanyl	N-Phenyl-N-[1-(1-thiophen-2-ylpropan-2-yl)-4-piperidyl]propanamide	103963-66-2
	α-Methyl-β-hydroxyfentanyl	N-[1-(1-hydroxy-1-phenylpropan-2-yl)piperidin-4-yl]-N-phenylpropanamide	
	Acetylfentanyl	N-(1-Phenethylpiperidin-4-yl)-N-phenylacetamide	3258-84-2
	Alfentanyl	N-{1-[2-(4-ethyl-5-oxo-4,5-dihydro-1H-1,2,3,4-tetrazol-1-yl)ethyl]-4-(methoxymethyl)piperidin-4-yl}-N-phenylpropanamide	71195-58-9
	Benzodioxolefentanyl	N-Phenyl-N-[1-(2-phenylethyl)piperidin-4-yl]-2H-1,3-benzodioxole-5-carboxamide	2306823-01-6
	Benzoylfentanyl	N-(1-Phenethylpiperidin-4-yl)-N-phenylbenzamide	2309383-15-9
	Benzylfentanyl	N-(1-Benzylpiperidin-4-yl)-N-phenylpropanamide	1474-02-8
Berger Fentanyl	BDBM50223545 (Berger Fentanyl)	1-[2-(2-phenylethyl)-3,4,4a,9b-tetrahydro-1H-pyrido[4,3-b]indol-5-yl]propan-1-one	
	β-Hydroxyfentanyl	N-[1-(2-Hydroxy-2-phenylethyl)piperidin-4-yl]-N-phenylpropanamide	78995-10-5
	β-Hydroxythiofentanyl	N-{1-[2-Hydroxy-2-(thiophen-2-yl)ethyl]piperidin-4-yl}-N-phenylpropanamide	1474-34-6
	β-Hydroxy-4-methylfentanyl	N-[1-(2-hydroxy-2-phenylethyl)-4-methylpiperidin-4-yl]-N-phenylpropanamide	
	β-Methylfentanyl	N-Phenyl-N-[1-(2-phenylpropyl)piperidin-4-yl]propanamide	79146-56-8
	Brorphine	1-{1-[1-(4-bromophenyl)ethyl]piperidin-4-yl}-1,3-dihydro-2H-benzimidazol-2-one	2244737-98-0
	Butyrfentanyl (Butyrylfentanyl, Bu-F, BUF)	N-(1-(2-Phenylethyl)-4-piperidinyl)-N-phenylbutyramide	1169-70-6
	Brifentanyl	N-[(3R,4S)-1-[2-(4-Ethyl-5-oxotetrazol-1-yl)ethyl] -3-methylpiperidin-4-yl]-N-(2-fluorophenyl)-2-methoxyacetamide	101345-71-5
	Carfentanyl ((4-Methoxycarbonyl)fentanyl)	Methyl 1-(2-phenylethyl)-4-[phenyl(propanoyl)amino]piperidine-4-carboxylate	59708-52-0
	Benzylcarfentanil	Methyl 1-benzyl-4-[phenyl(propanoyl)amino]piperidine-4-carboxylate	61085-72-1
	Ethylcarfentanil	Ethyl 1-(2-phenylethyl)-4-[phenyl(propanoyl)amino]piperidine-4-carboxylate	
	Crotonylfentanyl	N-Phenyl-N-[1-(2-phenylethyl)-4-piperidinyl]-2-butenamide	760930-59-4
	Cyclopentylfentanyl	N-phenyl-N-[1-(2-phenylethyl)piperidin-4-yl]cyclopentanecarboxamide	2088918-01-6
	Cyclobutylfentanyl	N-[1-(2-Phenylethyl)piperidin-4-yl]-N-phenylcyclobutanecarboxamide	2306827-55-2
	Cyclopropylfentanyl	N-[1-(2-Phenylethyl)piperidin-4-yl]-N-phenylcyclopropanecarboxamide	1169-68-2
	EAZ-91-05, Psicofentanil	(quinuclidin-3-yl) 4-[phenyl(propanoyl)amino]-1-[2-(indol-3-yl)ethyl]piperidine-4-carboxylate	
	Ethoxyacetylfentanyl	2-ethoxy-N-(1-phenethylpiperidin-4-yl)-N-phenylacetamide	778534-59-1
	Isobutyrylfentanyl	2-methyl-N-phenyl-N-[1-(1-phenylpropan-2-yl)piperidin-4-yl]propanamide	119618-70-1
	Isofentanyl	N-(1-Benzyl-3-methylpiperidin-4-yl)-N-phenylpropanamide	79278-40-3
	Homofentanyl (N-phenylpropylnorfentanyl)	N-phenyl-N-[1-(3-phenylpropyl)piperidin-4-yl]propanamide	59708-54-2
	R-4173	N-phenyl-N-{1-[4-(4-fluorophenyl)-4-oxobutyl]piperidin-4-yl}propanamide	2413-90-3
	trans-phenylcyclopropyl-norfentanyl	1-(trans-2-Phenylcyclopropyl)-4-(N-propionylanilino)piperidine.	102504-49-4
	2-Azaspiro[3.3]heptanefentanyl	N-[2-(2-phenylethyl)-2-azaspiro[3.3]heptan-6-yl]-N-phenylpropanamide	
	Fentanyl azepane	N-phenyl-N-[1-(2-phenylethyl)azepan-4-yl]propanamide	
	Fentanyl carbamate	ethyl N-phenyl-N-[1-(2-phenylethyl)piperidin-4-yl]carbamate	1465-20-9
	Pyridylfentanyl	N-phenyl-N-[1-(2-pyridin-4-ylethyl)piperidin-4-yl]propanamide	1443-41-0
	Furanylbenzylfentanyl	N-Phenyl-N-(1-benzylpiperidin-4-yl)furan-2-carboxamide	497240-21-8
	Furanylfentanyl (Fu-F, FUF)	N-Phenyl-N-[1-(2-phenylethyl)piperidin-4-yl]furan-2-carboxamide	101345-66-8
	Furanylethylfentanyl (Furanylethyl fentanyl, FUEF)	N-[1-[2-(2-furanyl)ethyl]-4-piperidinyl]-N-phenyl-propanamide	802544-02-1
	2-Benzofuranylethyl-alpha-methylfentanyl	N-(1-[1-(1-Benzofuran-2-yl)-2-propanyl]-4-piperidinyl)-N-phenylpropanamide	
	Fentanyl 4-methylene analogue (WO 2007/093603)	N-phenyl-N-{[1-(2-phenylethyl)piperidin-4-yl]methyl}propanamide	947139-57-3
	Indolylethylfentanyl	N-(1-[2-(1H-indol-3-yl)ethyl]-4-piperidinyl)-N-phenyl-propanamide	58399-46-5
	IQMF-4	N-[1-(2-Phenylethyl)piperidin-4-yl]-N-(1-phenylpyrazol-3-yl)prop-2-enamide	497100-48-8
	Lofentanyl	methyl (3S,4R)-3-methyl-1-(2-phenylethyl)-4-[phenyl(propionyl)amino]piperidine-4-carboxylate	61380-40-3
	N-Methylnorcarfentanyl	methyl 1-methyl-4-(N-phenylpropanamido)piperidine-4-carboxylate	59708-50-8
	Methoxyacetylfentanyl (MAF)	2-Methoxy-N-(1-phenethylpiperidin-4-yl)-N-phenylacetamide	101345-67-9
	meta-fluorofentanyl	N-(3-Fluorophenyl)-N-[1-(2-phenylethyl)-4-piperidinyl]-propanamide	90736-22-4
	meta-fluoro-methoxyacetylfentanyl	2-Methoxy-N-(1-phenethylpiperidin-4-yl)-N-(3-fluorophenyl)acetamide	2306825-32-9
	4-(Methylthiazolyl)-pyrazolylethylfentanyl	1-[2-(1H-pyrazol-1-yl)ethyl]-4-(4-methylthiazol-2-yl)-4-(N-phenylpropionamido)piperidine	120070-51-1
	Mirfentanyl	N-[1-(2-Phenylethyl)piperidin-4-yl]-N-pyrazin-2-yl-2-furamide	117523-47-4
MP102	MP102	N-cycloheptyl-1-(2-phenylethyl)-4-(N-propanoylanilino)piperidine-4-carboxamide	
	MP135	N-[4-{[2-(3-fluorophenyl)ethyl]carboxamido}-1-(2-phenylethyl)piperidin-4-yl]-N-benzylpropanamide	2677687-49-7
	N-(MDA)-fentanyl	N-(1-(1-(benzo[d][1,3]dioxol-5-yl)propan-2-yl)piperidin-4-yl)-N-phenylpropionamide	
	N-(2C-B)-fentanyl	N-(1-(2-(2,5-dimethoxy-4-bromophenyl)ethyl)piperidin-4-yl)-N-phenylpropionamide	
	Ocfentanyl	N-(2-Fluorophenyl)-2-methoxy-N-[1-(2-phenylethyl)piperidin-4-yl]acetamide	101343-69-5
	Ohmefentanyl (β-hydroxy-3-methylfentanyl)	N-[1-(2-hydroxy-2-phenylethyl)-3-methylpiperidin-4-yl]-N-phenylpropanamide	78995-14-9
Ohmecarfentanil	Ohmecarfentanil	methyl 1-(2-hydroxy-2-phenylethyl)-3-methyl-4-(N-propanoylanilino)piperidine-4-carboxylate	
	4"-Fluoroohmefentanyl	methyl 1-[2-hydroxy-2-(4-fluorophenyl)ethyl]-3-methyl-4-(N-propanoylanilino)piperidine-4-carboxylate	
	Orthofluorofentanyl	N-(2-Fluorophenyl)-N-[1-(2-phenylethyl)-4-piperidinyl]-propanamide	910616-29-4
	p-Bromofentanyl	N-(4-bromophenyl)-N-[1-(2-phenylethyl)-4-piperidinyl]-propanamide	117994-23-7
	p-Nitrofentanyl	N-(4-Nitrophenyl)-N-[1-(2-phenylethyl)-4-piperidinyl]-propanamide	
	Parafluoroisobutyrylbenzylfentanyl	N-[(1-benzylpiperidin-4-yl)methyl]-N-(4-fluorophenyl)-2-methylpropanamide	
	para-Fluorocyclopropylbenzylfentanyl	N-(1-benzylpiperidin-4-yl)-N-(4-fluorophenyl)cyclopropanecarboxamide	2344231-47-4
	Pivaloylfentanyl	2,2-dimethyl-N-phenyl-N-[1-(2-phenylethyl)piperidin-4-yl]propanamide	
	Pyrrole-fentanyl	N-[1-(2-Phenylethyl)piperidin-4-yl]-N-pyrrol-1-ylpropanamide	
	R-30490	N-[4-(Methoxymethyl)-1-(2-phenylethyl)piperidin-4-yl]-N-phenylpropanamide	60618-49-7
	Remifentanyl	methyl 1-(3-methoxy-3-oxopropyl)-4-(N-phenylpropanamido)piperidine-4-carboxylate	132875-61-7
	Remifentanil bis ethyl ester	ethyl 1-(3-ethoxy-3-oxopropyl)-4-(N-phenylpropanamido)piperidine-4-carboxylate	
	RR-49 (2'-fluoro β-fluorofentanyl)	N-{1-[2-Fluoro-2-(2-fluorophenyl)ethyl]piperidin-4-yl}-N-phenylpropanamide	2376328-79-7
SR 16412	SR-16412	1-(1-benzylpiperidin-4-yl)-3H-indol-2-one	16223-24-8
	Secofentanyl	N-phenyl-N-{4-[methyl(2-phenylethyl)amino]butan-2-yl}propanamide	253342-66-4
	Senecioylfentanyl	N-phenyl-N-[1-(2-phenylethyl)-4-piperidinyl]-3-methylbut-2-enamide	2630378-28-6
	Sufentanil	N-[4-(Methoxymethyl)-1-(2-thiofuran-2-ylethyl)-4-piperidyl]-N-phenylpropanamide	56030-54-7
	Tetrahydrofuranylfentanyl	N-Phenyl-N-[1-(2-phenylethyl)piperidin-4-yl]oxolane-2-carboxamide	2142571-01-3
	Tetramethylcyclopropylfentanyl	2,2,3,3-Tetramethyl-N-(1-phenethylpiperidin-4-yl)-N-phenylcyclopropane-1-carboxamide	2309383-11-5
	Tetramethylfentanyl	N-(2,2,6,6-tetramethyl-1-phenethyl-4-piperidyl)-N-phenyl-propanamide	
	Thenylfentanyl	N-phenyl-N-{[1-(thiophen-2-ylmethyl)piperidin-4-yl]methyl}propanamide	117332-93-1
	Thiafentanil	methyl 4-(N-(2-methoxyacetyl)anilino)-1-(2-thiophen-2-ylethyl)piperidine-4-carboxylate	101345-60-2
	Thiofentanyl	N-phenyl-N-{1-[2-(2-thienyl)ethyl]piperidin-4-yl}propanamide	1165-22-6
	Thiophenylfentanyl (Thiofuranylfentanyl)	N-Phenyl-N-[1-(2-phenylethyl)piperidin-4-yl]thiophene-2-carboxamide	2306823-38-9
	Trefentanyl	N-{1-[2-(4-ethyl-5-oxo-4,5-dihydro-1H-tetrazol-1-yl)ethyl]-4-phenylpiperidin-4-yl}-N-(2-fluorophenyl)propanamide	120656-93-1
	Trifluorofentanyl	N-(3,4-difluorophenyl)-N-[1-(2-[4-fluorophenyl]ethyl)-4-piperidinyl]-propanamide	
	Tropafentanyl (Fentanyl tropane)	N-phenyl-N-[8-(2-phenylethyl)-8-azabicyclo[3.2.1]octan-3-yl]propanamide	
	3,4-dichloro-4''-methoxyfentanyl	N-(3,4-dichlorophenyl)-N-[1-(2-[4-methoxyphenyl]ethyl)-4-piperidinyl]-propanamide	1161705-29-8
	Ureafentanyl	N,N-dimethyl-N'-phenyl-N'-[1-(2-phenylethyl)-4-piperidinyl]-urea	1443-50-1
	Valerylfentanyl (VF)	N-(1-(2-Phenylethyl)-4-piperidinyl)-N-phenylpentylamide	122882-90-0

== Analogue controls ==
Several jurisdictions have implemented analogue law controls of fentanyl analogues in an attempt to pre-emptively ban novel derivatives before they appear on the market. One representative example is the New Zealand provisions enacted in 1988 in response to the first wave of fentanyl derivatives. This bans a set of structures as follows;

"Fentanyl analogues, in which the N-[1-(2-phenethyl)-4-piperidyl]aniline nucleus has additional radicals, either alone or in combination, attached as follows:

(a) an acetyl, propionyl, butenoyl or butanoyl radical, attached to the aniline nitrogen atom:

(b) 1 or more alkyl radicals, with up to 10 carbon atoms in total, attached to the ethyl moiety:

(c) any combination of up to 5 alkyl radicals and/or alkoxy radicals (each with up to 6 carbon atoms, including cyclic radicals) and/or halogen radicals, attached to each of the benzene rings."

A more recent and somewhat broader example was introduced into US Federal legislation in 2018, covering the following structures;

"...fentanyl-related substances includes any substance not otherwise controlled in any schedule...that is structurally related to fentanyl by one or more of the following modifications:

1. Replacement of the phenyl portion of the phenethyl group by any monocycle, whether or not further substituted in or on the monocycle;
2. substitution in or on the phenethyl group with alkyl, alkenyl, alkoxyl, hydroxyl, halo, haloalkyl, amino or nitro groups;
3. substitution in or on the piperidine ring with alkyl, alkenyl, alkoxyl, ester, ether, hydroxyl, halo, haloalkyl, amino or nitro groups;
4. replacement of the aniline ring with any aromatic monocycle whether or not further substituted in or on the aromatic monocycle; and/or
5. replacement of the N-propionyl group by another acyl group."

== Organic chemistry ==
Because there are so many analogues of fentanyl, the naming for them tends to follow classical or IUPAC nomenclature conventions. This section is written to help illustrate the basic ring structure of fentanyl and what popular analogues reference on the carbon skeleton, helping a chemist working with fentanyl analogues quickly and consistently navigate the nomenclature system.

Part I

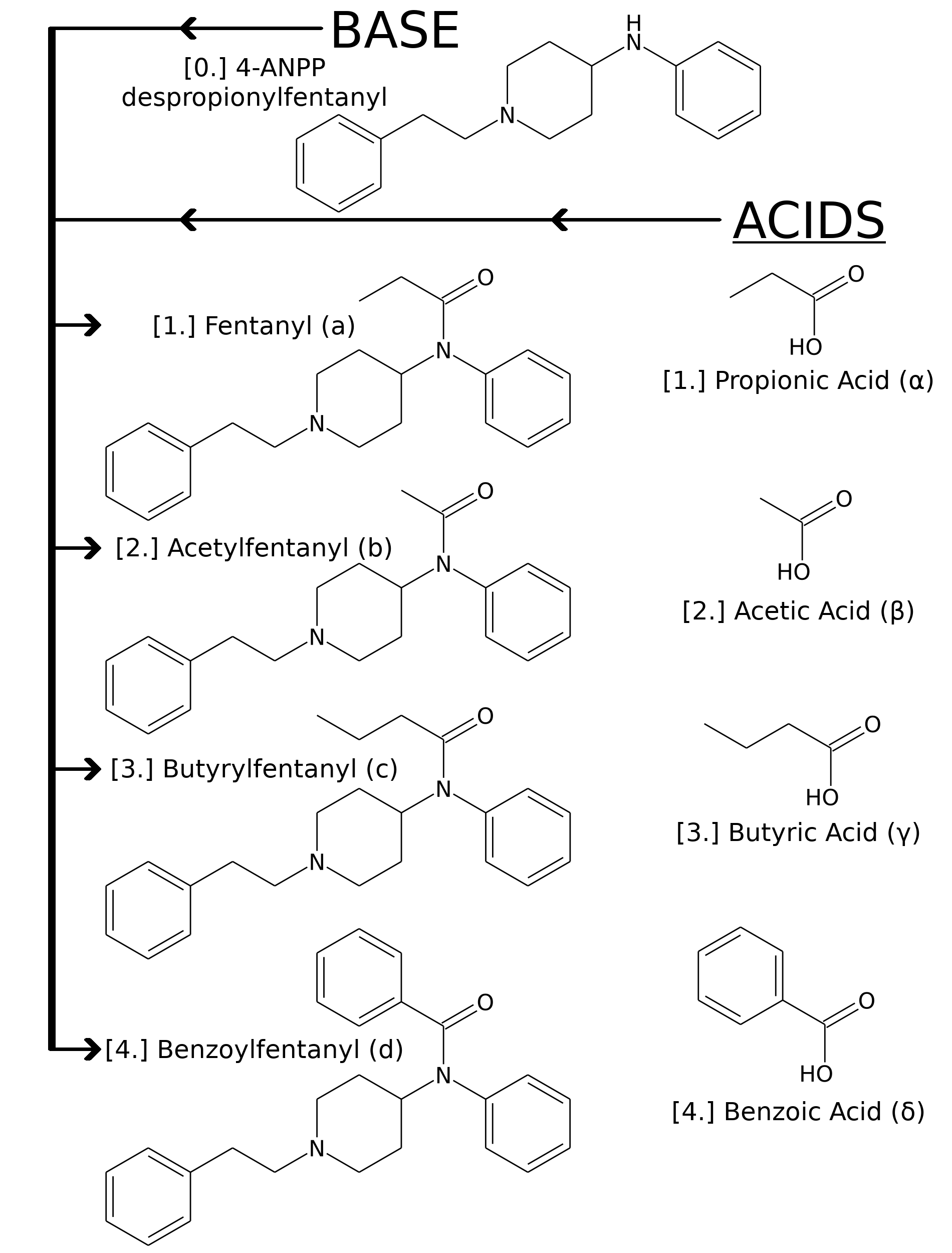
The synthesis of fentanyl and its analogues are illustrated in this skeletal diagram.

The synthesis of fentanyl and its analogues are illustrated in these skeletal diagrams. The synthesis of fentalogs is done by reacting the ring structure as a base, 4-ANPP also called 4-anilino-N-phenethylpiperidine and despropionylfentanyl. 4-ANPP acts as a base because of its two amine nitrogens, the secondary amine acts as a base to react with an organic acid which condenses into an amide. Depending on the organic acid used in the amide condensation, different analogues of fentanyl will be produced. To help align this phenomenon in the eyes of chemists, we have numerated the precursor 4-ANPP with a [0.], and then the reactions synthesizing fentanyl, acetylfentanyl, butyrylfentanyl, and benzoylfentanyl with a [1.], [2.], [3.], and [4.] respectively. To further aid in the chemical pedagogy we have aligned each number with a reaction number -> precursor -> product system that follows the following scheme: EXAMPLE: reaction number -> precursor -> product [compound name] 1 -> α -> a [fentanyl] 2 -> β -> b [acetylfentanyl] 3 -> γ -> c [butyrylfentanyl] 4 -> δ -> d [benzoylfentanyl]

Using the above scheme, a chemist can quickly extrapolate the reactions necessary for other fentanyl analogues with more complex organic acids, such as cyclopropryl fentanyl or cyclopentyl fentanyl, or any other fentanyl analogue derived from a reaction of 4-ANPP with a novel organic acid.

Part II

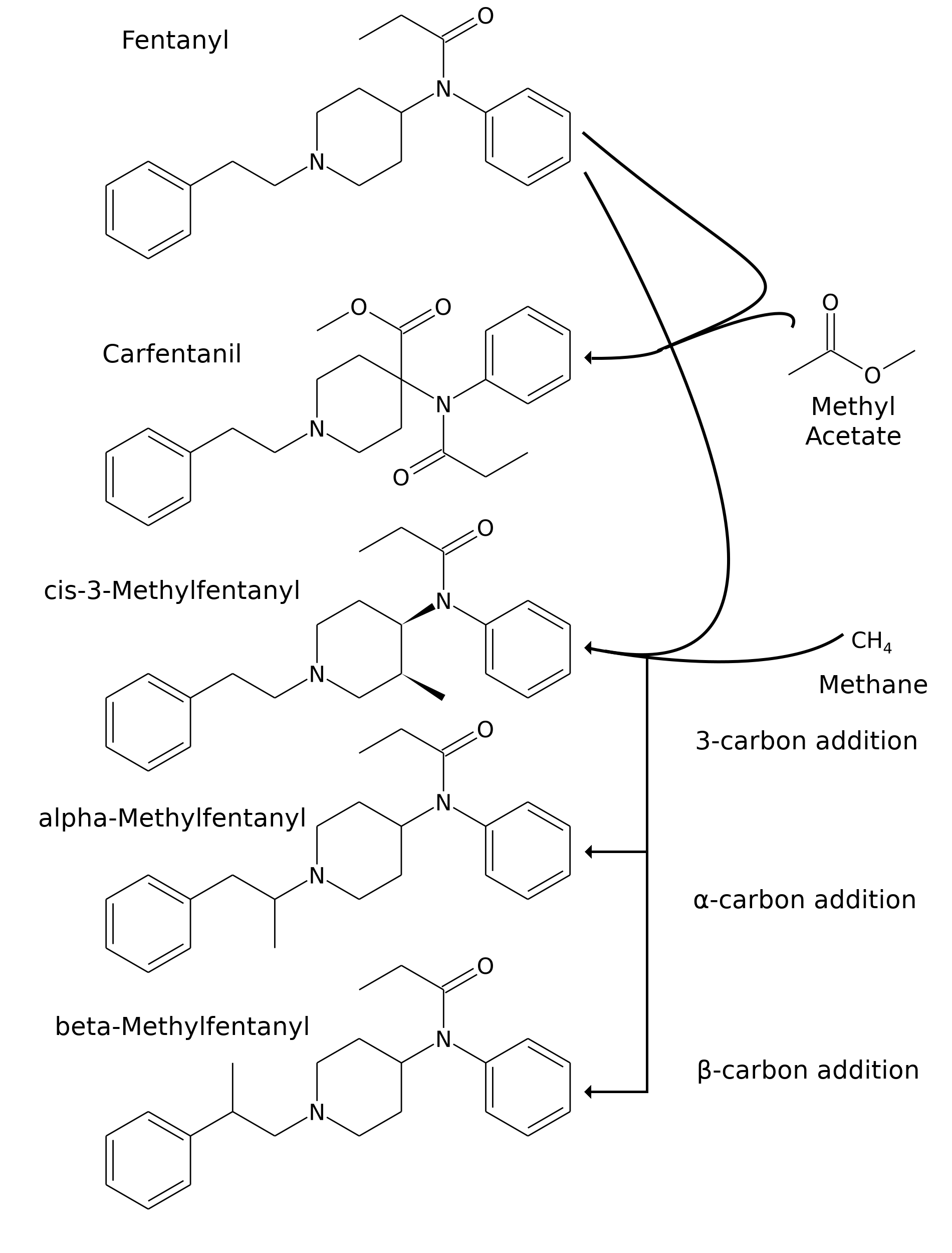
The synthesis of fentanyl and its analogues are illustrated in this skeletal diagram. Part II

The modifications covered in this diagram have to do with carbon skeleton modifications of the original fentanyl molecular structure. These are organized into methyl acetate additions, which are most known for the fentanyl -> carfentanil conversion. Many analogues of great potency, such as ohmfentanyl and lofentanyl possess methyl acetate groups added to the 4-carbon (of the piperidine ring, in the para- position relative to the annular nitrogen). The methyl acetate is added here from the α-carbon of the acetate moiety as it is with ohm- and lofentanyl. The 4-carbon is not a chiral center in carfetnanil because of a lack of piperidinyl substituents, but this same carbon is a chiral center in both ohm- and lofentanyl because both of those analogues have piperidinyl substituents.

The second group are organized into methyl additions, which are known for the fentanyl analogues such as α-methylfentanyl and cis-3-methylfentanyl. These analogues can possess a wide variety of modified pharmacological properties, including increased and decreased potency (receptor binding efficiency), increased or decreased half-life (metabolic binding efficiency) or other side effects on human physiology. Other substituents such as hydroxy, chloro, fluoro, and a wide variety of alkyl groups, are also substituted in place of these methylations to produce psychoactive analogues of fentanyl, but because they often use the same skeletal naming conventions as the simple methyl analogues, we did not reproduce them all in the image here.

Part III

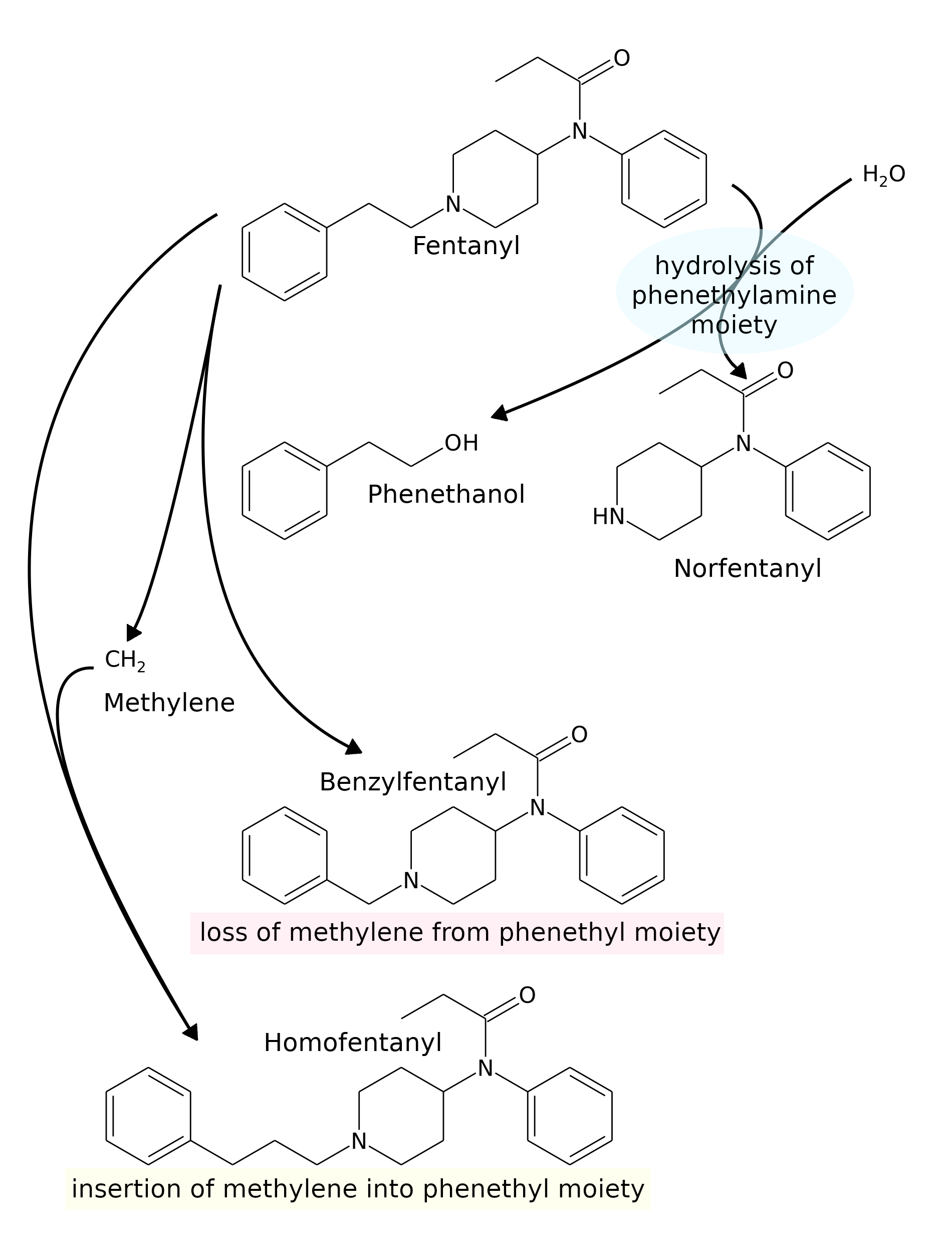
The synthesis of fentanyl and its analogues are illustrated in this skeletal diagram. Part III

The modifications described here cover alterations to the ring structure donated by the fentanyl precursor 4-ANPP. Although another series covered substitutions of hydrogen atoms on the original carbon ring structure, sometimes called functional group additions, this series focuses on the three main modifications to the phenethyl moiety. The first modifications is the removal of the phenethyl moeity from the piperidinyl nitrogen, depicted here as hydrolysis yielding phenethanol. This changes the parent skeletal name to norfentanyl.

The second and third modifications are the removal and addition of a methylene moiety internally in the ethyl chain within the greater phenethyl moiety. The removal of a methylene, which shortens the chain by one carbon length, creates the benzylfentanyl structure. The addition of a methylene, which lengthens the chain by one length, creates homofentanyl.

Part IV

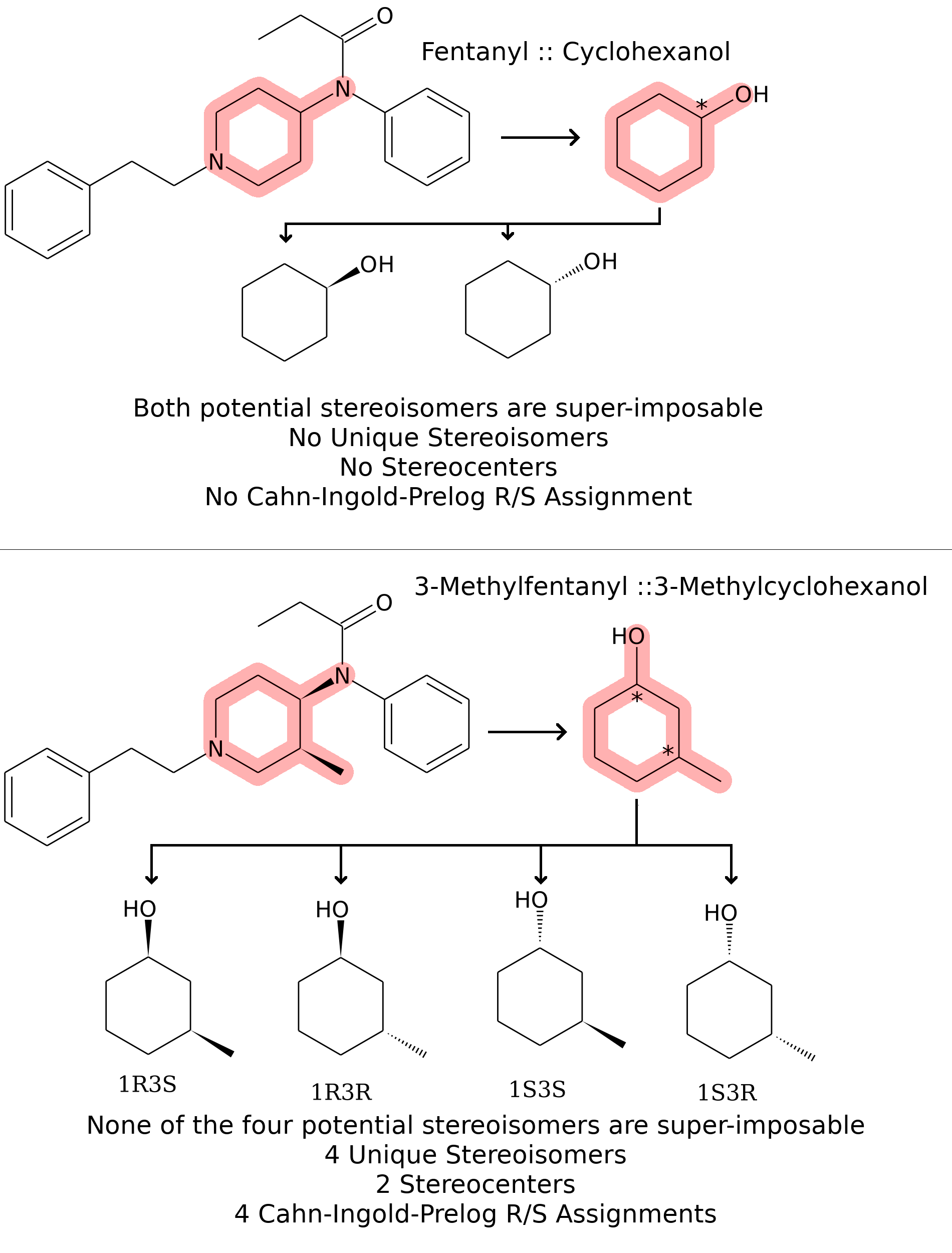
The synthesis of fentanyl and its analogues are illustrated in this skeletal diagram. Part IV

The modifications covered in this diagram have to do with stereochemistry and the assignment of unique Cahn-Ingold-Prelog R/S assignments to complex analogues of fentanyl. The stereochemistry of fentanyl analogues can seem at first counter-intuitive, because of the complex and unique nature of the reasoning organic chemists must develop to internalize complex three dimensional geometries such as those needed to comprehend stereochemistry. Thankfully these images follow a simple procedure for organizing a potential analogue of fentanyl into the total number of unique stereoisomers, the number of true stereocenters on the molecule, and the number of Cahn-Ingold-Prelog R/S assignments that are appropriate for that analogue.

The procedure used in the analysis of stereochemistry in these series of images is the following:

1. First the image is drawn out.
2. Second asterisks are placed by potential stereocenters as indicators (*).
3. Third the pairs of each stereocenters R and S orientations are combined through all possible permutations of stereocenters.
4. Fourth the permutations are checked for super-imposability, indicating that they are varying around what is not a true stereocenter and therefore the permutations are truly the self-same stereoisomer.

This procedure will be used when making an assessment of the number of valid stereoisomers that an analogue of fentanyl will be predicted to have. Because the analogues of fentanyl are so large, and the moieities (sub-regions) of the molecule that are relevant to its chirality are so small, that we often reproduce the fentanyl analogue as a smaller, simpler molecule with the same number of, and dynamics between its, stereocenters. This saves significant space allowing us not to reproduce redundant material that consumes a lot of space on the image.

The first case studied here is fentanyl itself, or propionyl-4-anilino-N-phenethylpiperidine, the most well known of the fentanyl analogues and the eponymous molecule (namesake) for the whole chemical category. The only identified stereocenter is found at the 4-carbon, opposite the piperidine nitrogen but adjacent to the aniline nitrogen. This seems to be a stereocenter because of the apparent 4 unique substituents. We transfer this stereocenter to the equivalent molecule cyclohexanol, with an analogous apparent stereocenter. Once we draw out the potential stereoisomers, we see that the two structures are super-imposable in three dimensions, and therefore are the self-same molecule. For this reason fentanyl does not have R/S assignments.

The second case studied here is of 3-methylfentanyl. There are two potential stereocenters, at the 4-carbon and also at the 3-carbon, where there is additionally a methyl group. Now, we mark both 3 and 4 carbon as potential stereocenters with an asterisk (*), and see how many potential stereoisomers we can eliminate. We see that of the four permutations of stereoisomers, none are super-imposable in three dimensions, meaning each is a unique stereoisomer and that both potential stereocenters were true. This gives four potential R/S assignments, 1R3S, 1R3R, 1S3S, 1S3R. What is particularly interesting and quite a contrast from the previous example of cyclohexanol, is the stereocenter at C-4 is indeed a true stereocenter here, whereas in the previous example of cyclohexanol as an analogy to fentanyl, the C-4 was not a true stereocenter. This changed because the modification of the C-3 carbon without an equivalent change on the C-2 carbon created an imbalance between two formerly identical substituents, creating a novel stereocenter where there was not one previously. This is why it is so important to follow the 4 steps in the above procedure every time, as "inherited procedural wisdom" may hold an organic chemist back in finding the true or correct answer.

Part V

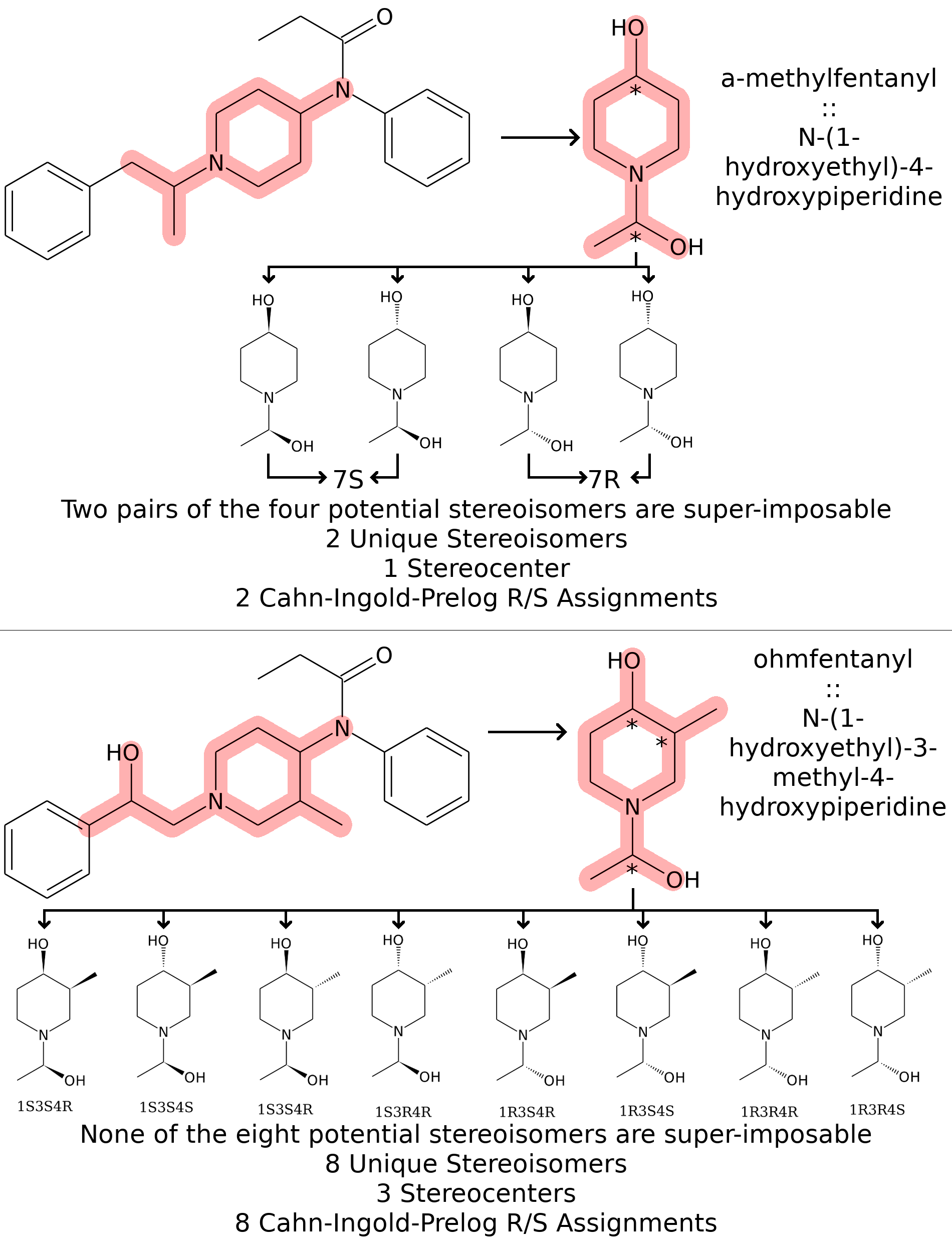
The synthesis of fentanyl and its analogues are illustrated in this skeletal diagram. Part V

The third case studied here is alpha-methylfentanyl. This group contains a substitution similar to the 3-methylfentanyl that was examined in the previous example on the previous image in this series (Fentanyl Synthesis p4.png), but it is on the phenethyl chain as opposed to being implanted on the piperidine ring. We then mark the two stereocenters, one on the C-4 carbon just as on fentanyl itself, and the other on the C-α (alpha carbon). To analogize these stereocenters we chose N-(1-hydroxyethyl)-4-hydroxypiperidine. When we draw out all potential stereoisomers, we see that the C-4 stereocenter is super-imposable, eliminating it as a true stereocenter. This leaves only 2 R/S assignments that follow the orientation of the stereocenter at the C-α (alpha carbon) position for the real α-methylfentanyl. These are labeled 7S and 7R, a reflection of the stereocenter in the piperidine derivative we used being at C-7 position. It is interesting that the C-4 stereocenter, which has no chiral activity in fentanyl (1st example), activiates it in 3-methylfentanyl with an on-the-ring addition, and loses it again in α-methylfentanyl with an off-the-ring addition.

The fourth case studied here is ohmfentanyl. Ohmfentanyl has three potential stereocenters, which are best analogized by another piperidine derivative: N-(1-hydroxyethyl)-3-methyl-4-hydroxypiperidine. This uses a similar structure to analogize the three potential stereocenters in ohmfentanyl, namely the 4-C, the 3-C, and the β-C (beta carbon). These three stereocenters are analogized in the C-4, C-3, and C-7 respectively. When we draw all potential stereoisomers out we see that they are not super-imposable in any combination of pairing, and therefore we have eight unique stereoisomers and three true stereocenters. This yields eight unique R/S assignment combinations which are outlined as captions under the stereoisomers of the analogous molecule.

These fundamentals are typically enough to help a chemists navigate the world of fentanyl analogues proficiently. Other substituents and substitutions generally follow the naming conventions outlined in this section. However, the presence of three six-membered rings which can each be independently substituted can easily lead to confusion, especially with the inconsistent use of prime notation.

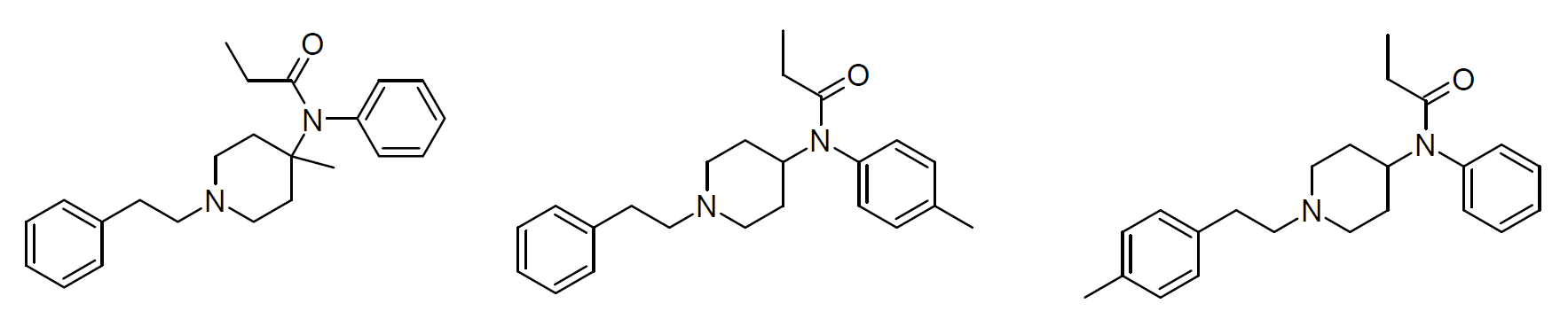
The structures of 4-methylfentanyl (left), 4'-methylfentanyl (centre) and 4"-methylfentanyl (right)

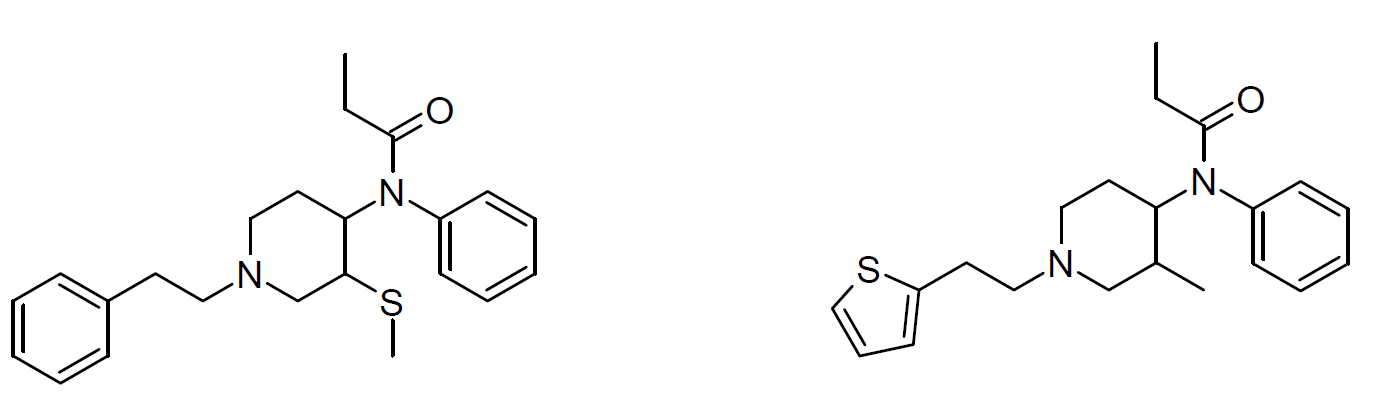
The structures of 3-methylthio-fentanyl (left) and 3-methyl-thiofentanyl (right)

For instance, 4-methylfentanyl, 4'-methylfentanyl and 4"-methylfentanyl are all known compounds, as are 3-methylthio-fentanyl and 3-methyl-thiofentanyl, all of which have varying potencies and pharmacokinetics.

Confusion between different positional isomers is especially significant in the case of fentanyls because of the huge variation in potency between different members of the class. The weakest compounds such as benzylfentanyl are around the same potency as codeine (i.e. approximately 1/10th the potency of morphine), while the strongest compounds such as carfentanil and ohmefentanil can be over 10,000x more potent than morphine, meaning there is a 100,000-fold variation in potency between the strongest and weakest fentanyl derivatives. This means that two positional isomers with the same molecular weight, which may be difficult to tell apart without detailed chemical analysis, may be hundreds or even thousands of times different in pharmacological potency. Also the wide variety of substitutions that have been used on the basic fentanyl structure, each of which can either reduce or increase the potency, can be unpredictable when used in combination, so it may be impossible to estimate the likely potency of newly discovered analogues until pharmacological testing has been carried out.

== See also ==
- 25-NB
- Arylcyclohexylamine
- List of benzimidazole opioids
- List of orphine opioids
- List of phenyltropanes
- Opioid
- Structural scheduling of synthetic cannabinoids
- Substituted cathinone
- Utopioid
