= 4-Fluorobutyrfentanyl =

Opioid analgesic

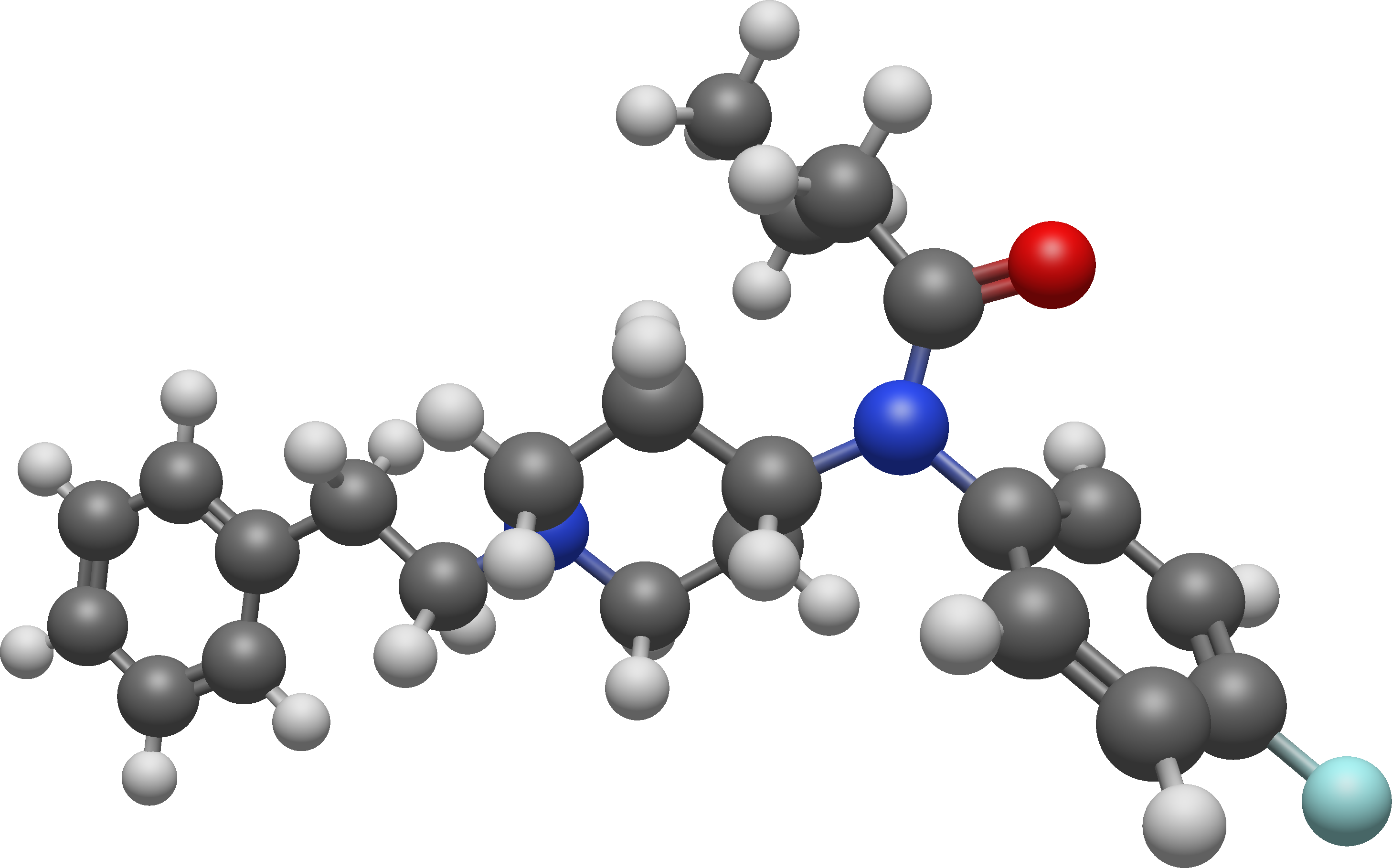

Legal status
- Legal status: BR: Class F1 (Prohibited narcotics); CA: Schedule I; DE: Anlage II (Authorized trade only, not prescriptible); UK: Class A; US: Schedule I; Illegal in China and Sweden

Identifiers
- IUPAC name: N-(4-Fluorophenyl)-N-[1-(2-phenylethyl)-4-piperidinyl]-butanamide
- CAS Number: 244195-31-1
- PubChem CID: 86280430
- ChemSpider: 32779976
- UNII: 2378L0E82T
- KEGG: C22765
- CompTox Dashboard (EPA): DTXSID101032566

Chemical and physical data
- Formula: C_{23}H_{29}FN_{2}O
- Molar mass: 368.496 g·mol^{−1}
- 3D model (JSmol): Interactive image
- SMILES: CCCC(=O)N(C1CCN(CC1)CCC2=CC=CC=C2)C3=CC=C(C=C3)F
- InChI: InChI=1S/C23H29FN2O/c1-2-6-23(27)26(21-11-9-20(24)10-12-21)22-14-17-25(18-15-22)16-13-19-7-4-3-5-8-19/h3-5,7-12,22H,2,6,13-18H2,1H3; Key:QZFMCYUBPSLOBP-UHFFFAOYSA-N

4-Fluorobutyrylfentanyl (also known as 4-FBF and p-FBF or para-fluorobutyrylfentanyl) is an opioid analgesic that is an analog of butyrfentanyl and has been sold online as a designer drug. It is closely related to 4-fluorofentanyl, which has an EC_{50} value of 4.2 nM for the human μ-opioid receptor.

== Side effects ==
Side effects of fentanyl analogs are similar to those of fentanyl itself, which include itching, nausea and potentially serious respiratory depression, which can be life-threatening. Fentanyl analogs have killed hundreds of people throughout Europe and the former Soviet republics since the most recent resurgence in use began in Estonia in the early 2000s, and novel derivatives continue to appear.

== Legal status ==
Sweden's public health agency suggested classifying 4-fluorobutyrylfentanyl as hazardous substance on August 18, 2014.

In October 2015, 4-fluorobutyrylfentanyl became a controlled substance in China.

4-Fluorobutyrfentanyl is a Schedule I controlled drug in the USA since 1. February 2018.

== See also ==
- 3-Methylbutyrfentanyl
- 3-Methylfentanyl
- 4-Fluorofentanyl
- 4-Fluoroisobutyrfentanyl
- α-Methylfentanyl
- Acetylfentanyl
- Acrylfentanyl
- Furanylfentanyl
- List of fentanyl analogues
