= Thiafentanil =

Chemical compound

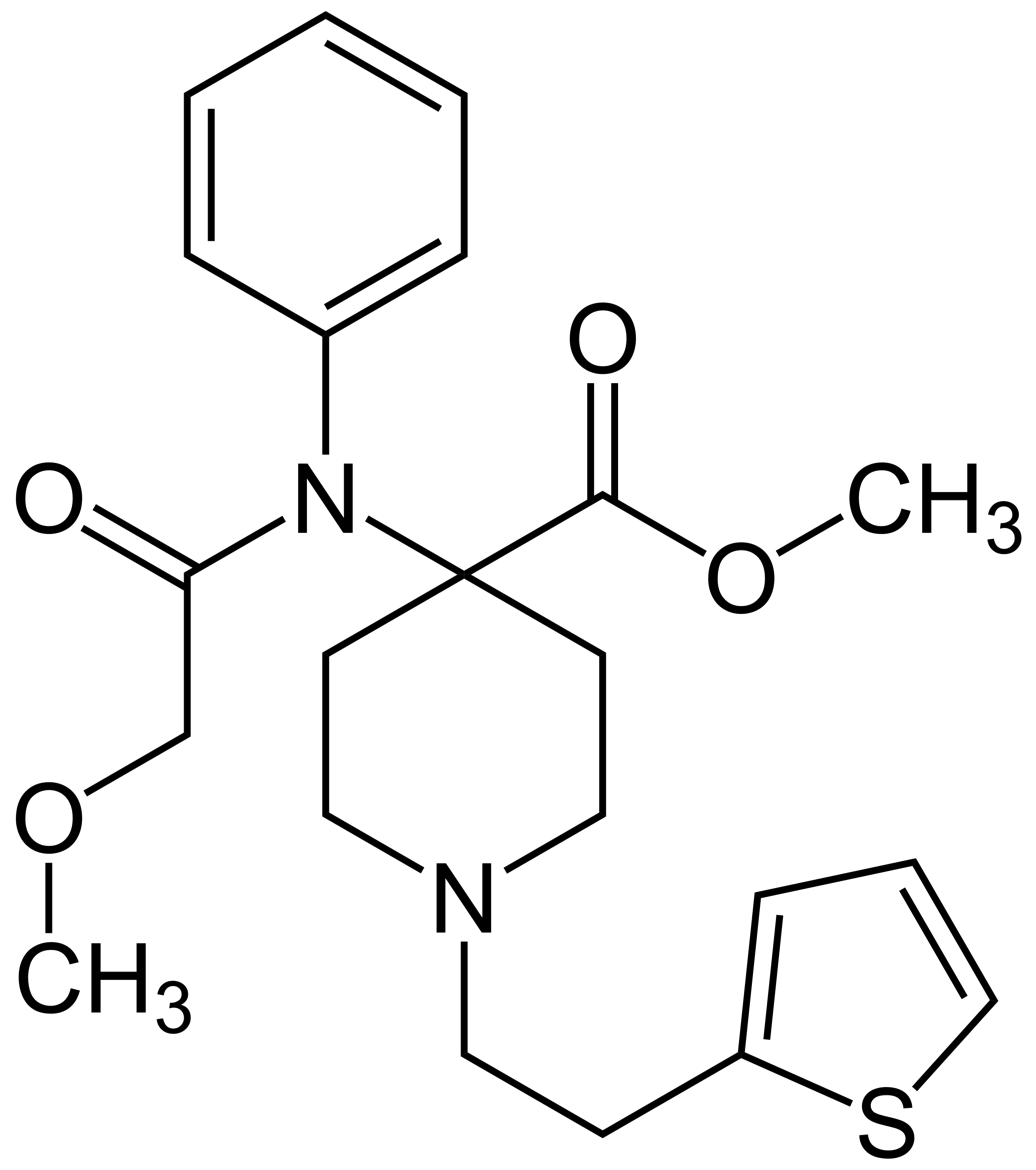

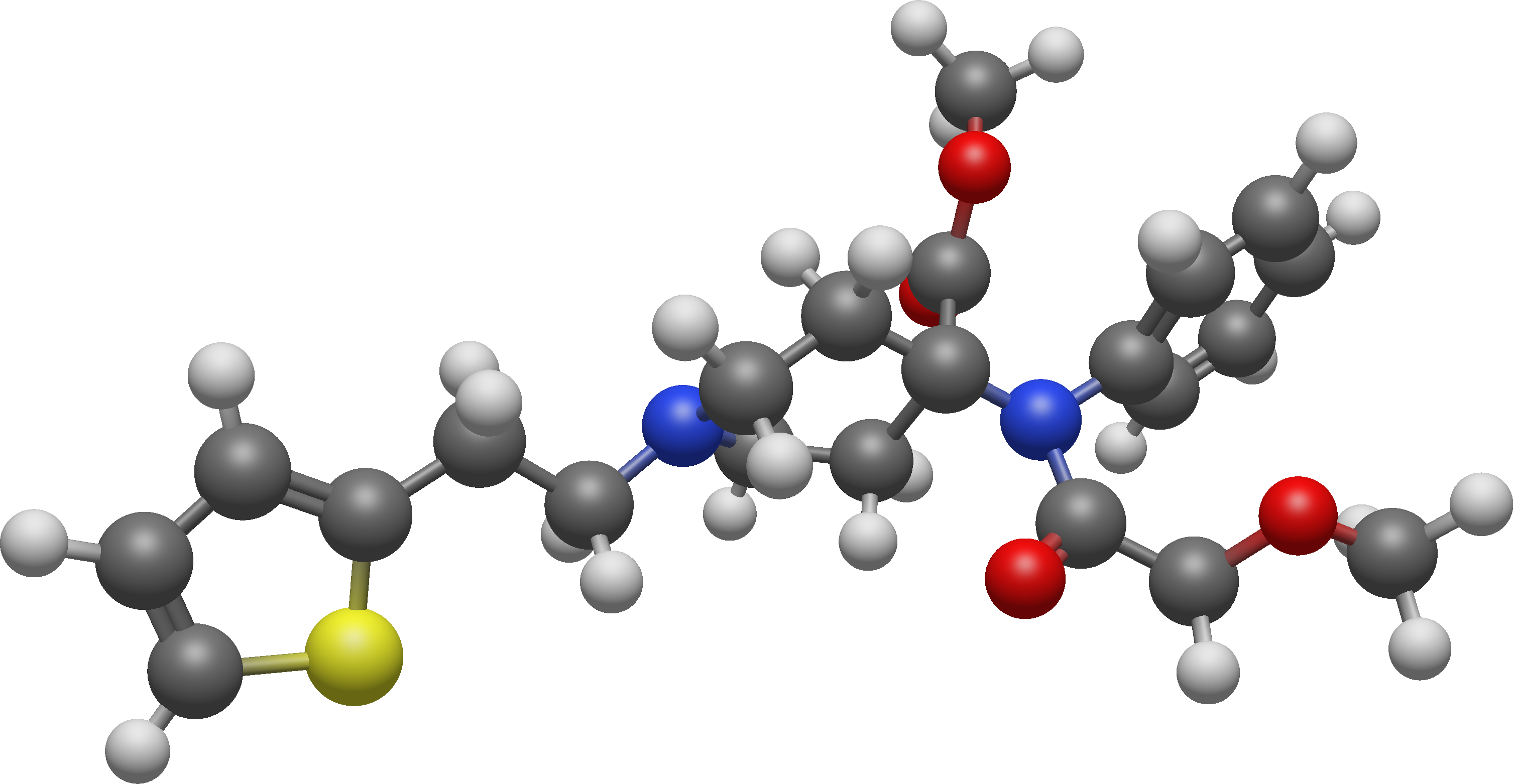

Legal status
- Legal status: CA: Schedule I; UK: Class A; US: Schedule II

Identifiers
- IUPAC name: methyl 4-(N-(2-methoxyacetyl)anilino)-1-(2-thiophen-2-ylethyl)piperidine-4-carboxylate
- CAS Number: 101345-60-2
- PubChem CID: 13653617
- ChemSpider: 58828132
- UNII: HS2D307FGT

Chemical and physical data
- Formula: C_{22}H_{28}N_{2}O_{4}S
- Molar mass: 416.54 g·mol^{−1}
- 3D model (JSmol): Interactive image
- SMILES: COCC(=O)N(C1=CC=CC=C1)C2(CCN(CC2)CCC3=CC=CS3)C(=O)OC
- InChI: InChI=1S/C22H28N2O4S/c1-27-17-20(25)24(18-7-4-3-5-8-18)22(21(26)28-2)11-14-23(15-12-22)13-10-19-9-6-16-29-19/h3-9,16H,10-15,17H2,1-2H3; Key:HFRKHTCPWUOGHM-UHFFFAOYSA-N

Thiafentanil (A-3080, Thianil) is a highly potent opioid analgesic that is an analog of fentanyl, and was invented in 1986. Its analgesic potency is slightly less than that of carfentanil (itself approximately 10,000 times the potency of morphine, or 4,000 times that of heroin), though with a faster onset of effects, shorter duration of action and a slightly lesser tendency to produce respiratory depression. It is used in veterinary medicine to anesthetise animals such as impala, usually in combination with other anesthetics such as ketamine, xylazine or medetomidine to reduce the prevalence of side effects such as muscle rigidity.

== Side effects ==
Potent pure opioid antagonists such as naltrexone or nalmefene are recommended in the event of accidental human exposure to thiafentanil.

== Legal status ==
Thiafentanil is a Schedule II controlled drug in the USA since August 2016.

== See also ==
- Sufentanil
- List of fentanyl analogues
