= 3-Methylfentanyl =

Opioid analgesic

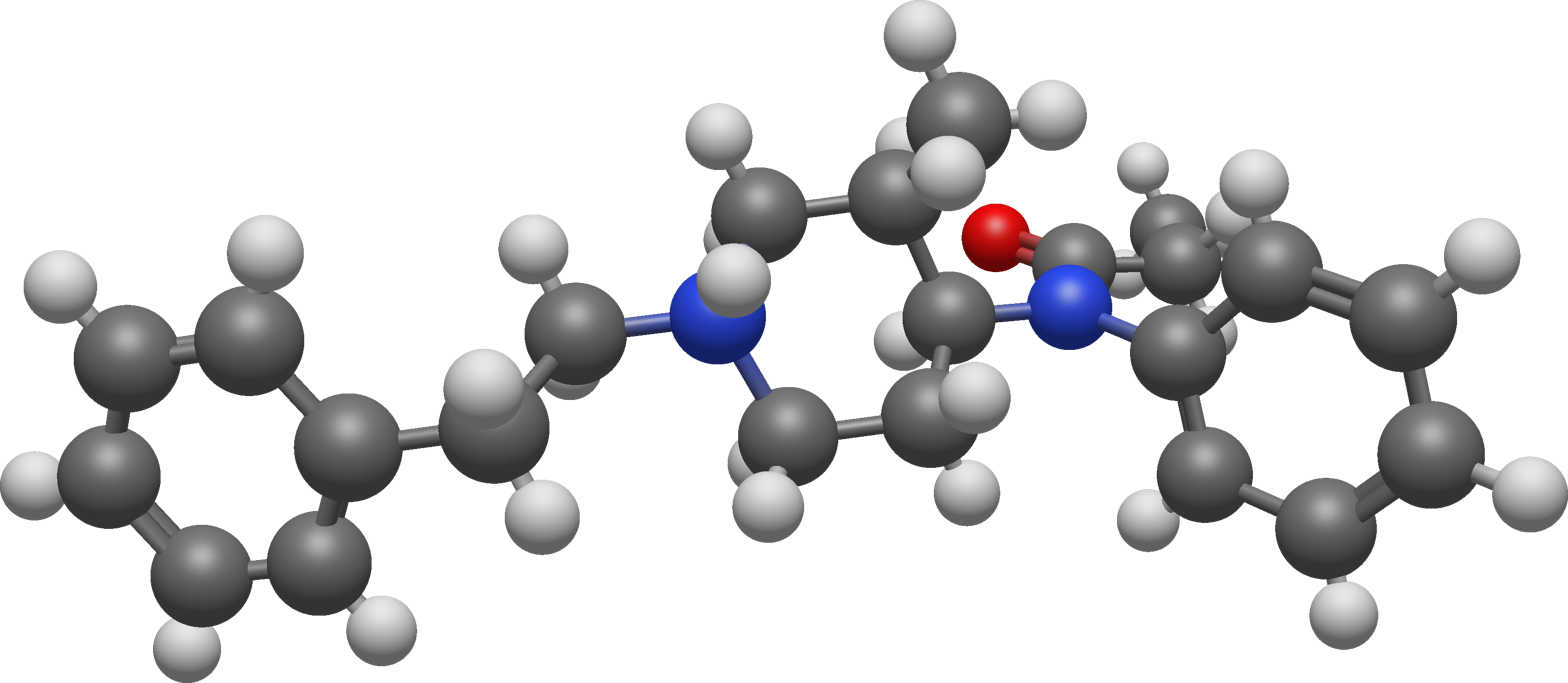

Clinical data
- Other names: 3-methylfentanyl, Mefentanyl

Legal status
- Legal status: AU: Unscheduled; BR: Class F1 (Prohibited narcotics); CA: Schedule I; DE: Anlage I (Authorized scientific use only); NZ: Unscheduled; UK: Class A; US: Schedule I; UN: Unscheduled

Identifiers
- IUPAC name: (RS)-N-(3-methyl-1-phenethyl-4-piperidyl)-N-phenyl-propanamide
- CAS Number: 42045-86-3
- PubChem CID: 61996
- DrugBank: DB01571
- ChemSpider: 55844
- UNII: QVU94XE61A
- KEGG: C22793
- ChEBI: CHEBI:61092
- CompTox Dashboard (EPA): DTXSID30962228

Chemical and physical data
- Formula: C_{23}H_{30}N_{2}O
- Molar mass: 350.506 g·mol^{−1}
- 3D model (JSmol): Interactive image
- Chirality: Racemic mixture
- SMILES: CCC(=O)N(c1ccccc1)C2CCN(CC2C)CCc3ccccc3
- InChI: InChI=1S/C23H30N2O/c1-3-23(26)25(21-12-8-5-9-13-21)22-15-17-24(18-19(22)2)16-14-20-10-6-4-7-11-20/h4-13,19,22H,3,14-18H2,1-2H3; Key:MLQRZXNZHAOCHQ-UHFFFAOYSA-N

3-Methylfentanyl (3-MF, mefentanyl) is an opioid analgesic that is an analog of fentanyl. 3-Methylfentanyl is one of the most potent opioids, estimated to be between 400 and 6000 times stronger than morphine, depending on which isomer is used (with the cis isomers being the more potent ones).

== Overview and history ==
3-methylfentanyl was first discovered in 1974 and subsequently appeared on the street as an alternative to the clandestinely produced fentanyl analog α-methylfentanyl. However, it quickly became apparent that 3-methylfentanyl was much more potent than α-methylfentanyl, and correspondingly more dangerous.

The chemical structure of fentanyl has been used as a basis in modern chemistry for the discovery and nomenclature of many new fentanyl analogues, sometimes called fentalogs.

While 3-methylfentanyl was initially sold on the black market for only a short time between 1984 and 1985, its high potency made it an attractive target to clandestine drug producers, as racemic 3-MF is 10–15 times more potent than fentanyl, and so correspondingly larger amounts of cut product for street sales can be produced for an equivalent amount of effort as for producing fentanyl itself; one gram of 3-methylfentanyl might be sufficient to produce several thousand dosage units once diluted for sale. 3-MF has thus reappeared several times, at various places around the world.

The only country in the world with significant (200+ deaths a year, more than 10,000 addicts) abuse of this chemical is Estonia, where a dose of 3-MF costs 10 €, and other opiates are not generally available since the end of the 2000s. Approximately 1100 deaths from fentanyl and 3-MF abuse were recorded in Estonia between 2005–2013, compared to approximately 450 deaths in Sweden, Germany, UK, Finland and Greece combined during the same period.

Other opioid analogs even more potent still than 3-MF are known, such as carfentanil and ohmefentanyl, but these are significantly more difficult to manufacture than 3-methylfentanyl. Since 2016 fentanyl seizures in Estonia contains mostly carfentanil or cyclopropylfentanyl.

3-methylfentanyl has similar effects to fentanyl, but is far more potent due to increased binding affinity to its target site. Since fentanyl itself is already highly potent, 3-methylfentanyl is extremely dangerous when used recreationally, and has resulted in many deaths among recreational opioid users ingesting the drug. Side effects of fentanyl analogs are similar to those of fentanyl itself, which include itching, nausea and potentially serious respiratory depression, which can be life-threatening. Fentanyl analogs have killed hundreds of people throughout Europe and the former Soviet republics since the most recent resurgence in use began in Estonia in the early 2000s, and novel derivatives continue to appear.

== Use as chemical weapon ==
3-Methylfentanyl was also reported by media as the identity of the anaesthetic "gas" Kolokol-1 delivered as an aerosol during the Moscow theater hostage crisis in 2002 in which many hostages died from accidental overdoses, 3-methylfentanyl was later ruled out as the primary agent used. The opiate antidote naloxone was on-hand to treat the victims of the crisis, but, whether due to their incarceration, lack of food, or water, or sleep, or due to the novel nature of the still-unconfirmed compound used, acute symptoms continued to develop, resulting in many fatalities despite the administration of naloxone.

== Synthesis ==
A number of methods for synthesis have been published. The most recent is probably the method posted by the Serbian chemical society (2004).

There is another method, though, for constructing the N-Benzyl-3-methyl-4-piperidone in a 2-stage Michael reaction, followed by Dieckmann cyclization as per usual.

== See also ==
- 3-Methylbutyrfentanyl
- 4-Fluorofentanyl
- α-Methylfentanyl
- Acetylfentanyl
- Butyrfentanyl
- List of fentanyl analogues
