= 3-Methylbutyrfentanyl =

Opioid analgesic

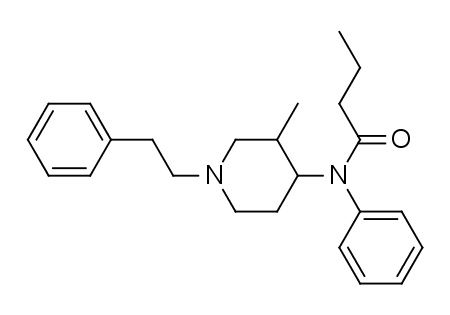

Legal status
- Legal status: CA: Schedule I; DE: NpSG (Industrial and scientific use only); UK: Class A; US: Schedule I

Identifiers
- IUPAC name: N-[3-Methyl-1-(2-phenylethyl)piperidin-4-yl]-N-phenylbutanamide
- CAS Number: 97605-09-9
- PubChem CID: 86130531
- ChemSpider: 57434313
- UNII: 875L53T89N
- CompTox Dashboard (EPA): DTXSID501017180

Chemical and physical data
- Formula: C_{24}H_{32}N_{2}O
- Molar mass: 364.533 g·mol^{−1}
- 3D model (JSmol): Interactive image
- SMILES: CCCC(=O)N(c1ccccc1)C2CCN(CC2C)CCc3ccccc3
- InChI: InChI=1S/C24H32N2O/c1-3-10-24(27)26(22-13-8-5-9-14-22)23-16-18-25(19-20(23)2)17-15-21-11-6-4-7-12-21/h4-9,11-14,20,23H,3,10,15-19H2,1-2; Key:ZPAOSKLOFZWBLS-UHFFFAOYSA-N

3-Methylbutyrfentanyl (3-MBF) is an opioid analgesic that is an analog of butyrfentanyl.

Side effects of fentanyl analogs are similar to those of fentanyl itself, which include itching, nausea and potentially serious respiratory depression, which can be life-threatening. Fentanyl analogs have killed hundreds of people throughout Europe and the former Soviet republics since the most recent resurgence in use began in Estonia in the early 2000s, and novel derivatives continue to appear.

== See also ==
- 3-Methylfentanyl
- 4-Fluorobutyrfentanyl
- 4-Fluorofentanyl
- α-Methylfentanyl
- Acetylfentanyl
- Furanylfentanyl
- List of fentanyl analogues
