= Furanylfentanyl =

Opioid analgesic

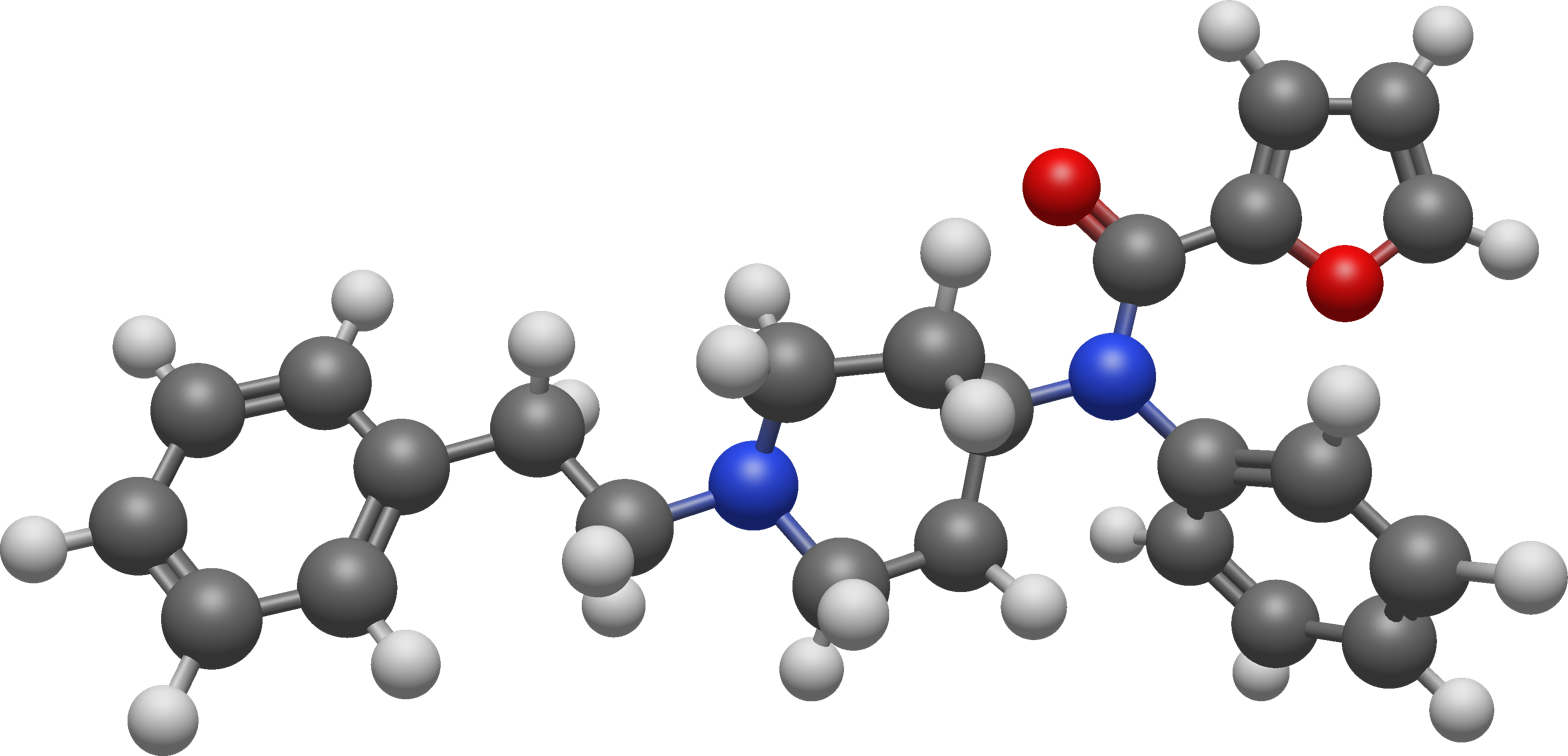

Clinical data
- ATC code: none

Legal status
- Legal status: BR: Class F1 (Prohibited narcotics); CA: Schedule I; DE: Anlage II (Authorized trade only, not prescriptible); UK: Under Psychoactive Substances Act; US: Schedule I; UN: Narcotic Schedule I; Illegal in Sweden

Identifiers
- IUPAC name: N-Phenyl-N-[1-(2-phenylethyl)piperidin-4-yl]furan-2-carboxamide
- CAS Number: 101345-66-8
- PubChem CID: 13653606
- ChemSpider: 14921702
- UNII: 3F7C9J1LS7
- KEGG: C22761
- ChEBI: CHEBI:233684
- CompTox Dashboard (EPA): DTXSID601032311

Chemical and physical data
- Formula: C_{24}H_{26}N_{2}O_{2}
- Molar mass: 374.484 g·mol^{−1}
- 3D model (JSmol): Interactive image
- SMILES: O=C(N(C1CCN(CC1)CCc2ccccc2)c3ccccc3)c4occc4
- InChI: InChI=1/C24H26N2O2/c27-24(23-12-7-19-28-23)26(21-10-5-2-6-11-21)22-14-17-25(18-15-22)16-13-20-8-3-1-4-9-20/h1-12,19,22H,13-18H2; Key:FZJVHWISUGFFQV-UHFFFAOYSA-N

Furanylfentanyl (Fu-F) is an opioid analgesic that is an analog of fentanyl and has been sold as a designer drug. It has an ED_{50} value of 0.02 mg/kg in mice. Research done in the 1980s showed that in humans furanylfentanyl is 50-100 times more potent than morphine, making it roughly half as potent as fentanyl, toxicology reports seem to confirm this finding after furanylfentanyl began appearing on the illicit drug market in 2015.

== Side effects ==
Side effects of fentanyl analogs are similar to those of fentanyl itself, which include itching, nausea and potentially serious respiratory depression, which can be life-threatening. Fentanyl analogs have killed hundreds of people throughout Europe and the former Soviet republics since the most recent resurgence in use began in Estonia in the early 2000s, and novel derivatives continue to appear.

Life-threatening adverse reactions caused by furanylfentanyl use have been observed in Sweden and Canada. At least seven deaths in Cook County, Illinois, have been linked to furanylfentanyl in 2016, with additional deaths in suburban Chicago in 2017.

=== Detection in biological fluids ===
Furanylfentanyl may be measured in blood or urine to monitor for use, confirm a diagnosis of poisoning, or assist in a medicolegal death investigation. Commercially available immunoassays are often used as initial screening tests, but chromatographic techniques are generally used for confirmation and quantitation. Blood furanylfentanyl concentrations are expected to be in a range of 1-45 μg/L in victims of fatal overdosage.

== Legal status ==
Furanylfentanyl is illegal in Sweden as of January 2016.

The United States Drug Enforcement Administration (DEA) proposed a temporary placement of furanylfentanyl into Schedule I of the Controlled Substances Act on 27 September 2016. On November 29, 2016, the DEA issued its final rule, making furanylfentanyl Schedule I.

== See also ==
- 3-Methylbutyrfentanyl
- 3-Methylfentanyl
- 4-Fluorofentanyl
- α-Methylfentanyl
- Acetylfentanyl
- Acrylfentanyl
- Benzoylfentanyl
- Butyrfentanyl
- List of fentanyl analogues
- Mirfentanil
