= Butyrfentanyl =

Synthetic opioid analgesic

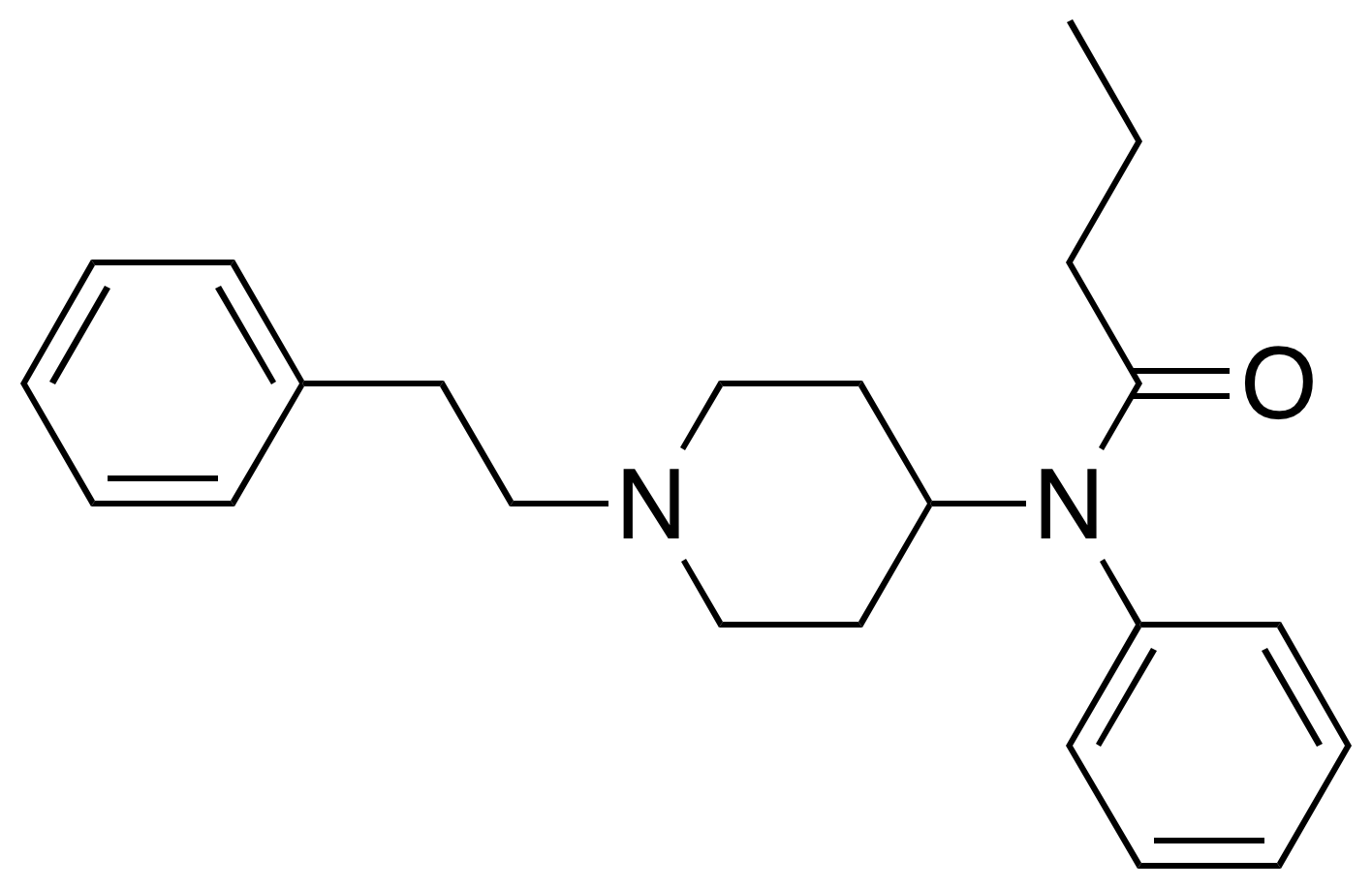

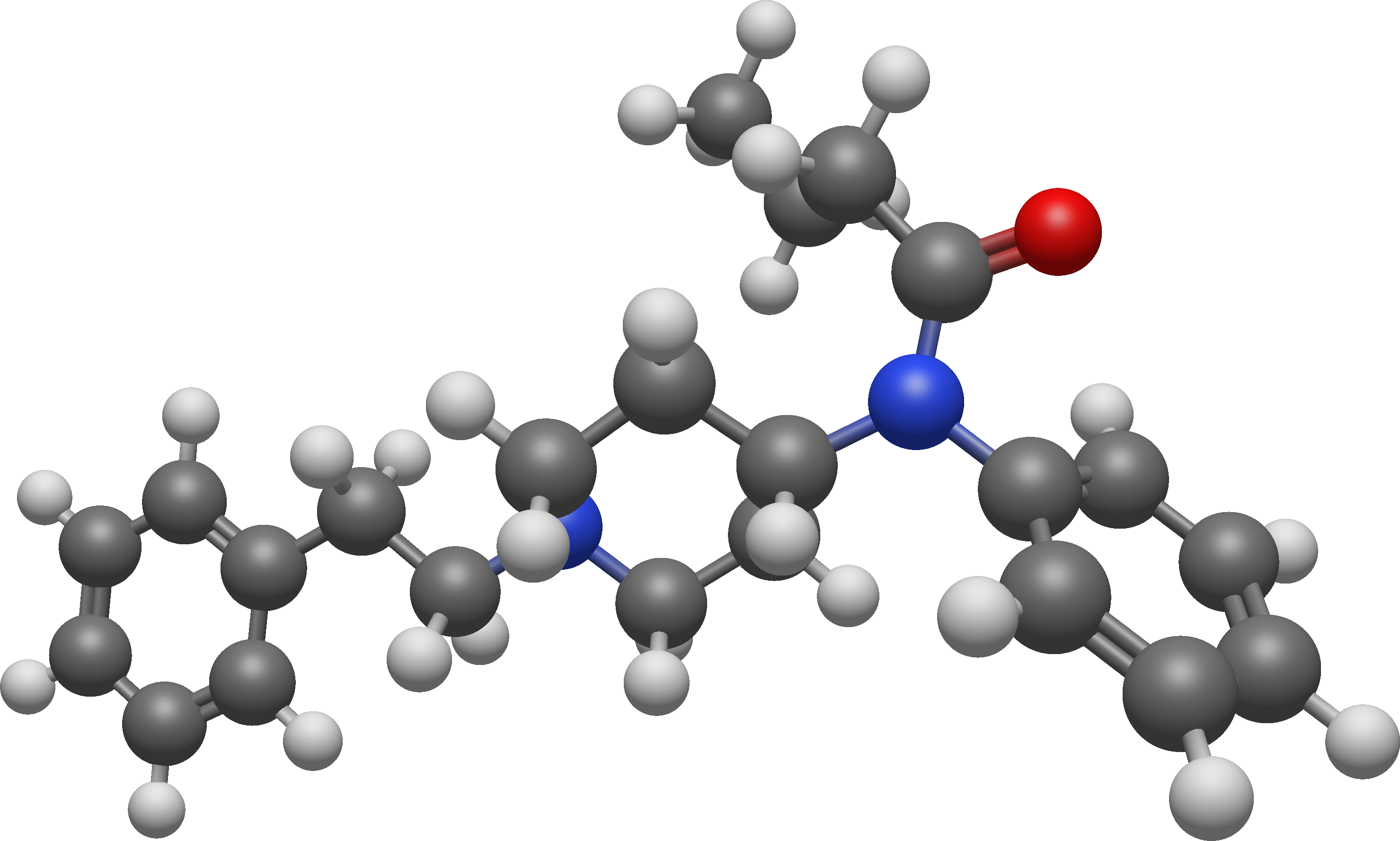

Clinical data
- ATC code: none

Legal status
- Legal status: BR: Class F1 (Prohibited narcotics); CA: Schedule I; DE: Anlage II (Authorized trade only, not prescriptible); UK: Class A; US: Schedule I

Identifiers
- IUPAC name: N-(1-(2-Phenylethyl)-4-piperidinyl)-N-phenylbutyramide
- CAS Number: 1169-70-6
- PubChem CID: 621174
- DrugBank: DB09173
- ChemSpider: 539764
- UNII: 07V1H7R6ZN
- KEGG: C22760
- ChEBI: CHEBI:233557
- CompTox Dashboard (EPA): DTXSID30347410

Chemical and physical data
- Formula: C_{23}H_{30}N_{2}O
- Molar mass: 350.506 g·mol^{−1}
- 3D model (JSmol): Interactive image
- SMILES: CCCC(=O)N(C2CCN(CCc1ccccc1)CC2)c3ccccc3
- InChI: InChI=1S/C23H30N2O/c1-2-9-23(26)25(21-12-7-4-8-13-21)22-15-18-24(19-16-22)17-14-20-10-5-3-6-11-20/h3-8,10-13,22H,2,9,14-19H2,1H3; Key:QQOMYEQLWQJRKK-UHFFFAOYSA-N

Butyrfentanyl or butyrylfentanyl is a potent short-acting synthetic opioid analgesic drug. It is an analog of fentanyl with around one quarter of its potency. One of the first mentions of this drug can be found in document written by The College on Problem of Drug Dependence, where it is mentioned as N-butyramide fentanyl analog. This document also states that the article describing its clinical effects (analgesic studies, μ-, δ-, κ-opioid receptor binding, and in vitro measures of drug efficacy, antinociceptive, and narcotic properties) was published in 1987. It is an agonist for the μ-opioid receptors.

Butyrfentanyl has no current legitimate clinical applications; however, it is being sold as a designer drug.

Side effects of fentanyl analogs are similar to those of fentanyl itself, which include itching, nausea, and potentially serious respiratory depression which can be life-threatening. Fentanyl analogs have killed hundreds of people throughout Europe and the former Soviet republics since the most recent resurgence in use began in Estonia in the early 2000s, and novel derivatives continue to appear.

== Pharmacokinetics ==
Butyrfentanyl binds to the opioid receptor. During the studies of in vitro inhibition of specific [3H] fentanyl binding to the opioid receptor, the order of analogues was: (±)-cis-3-methylfentanyl > fentanyl = alpha-methylfentanyl > butyrylfentanyl > benzylfentanyl. The studies in inhibition studies on binding affinity achieved the same order of analogues. It means that butyrfentantyl is a less potent opioid-agonist than fentanyl. On the other side, during in vitro studies of cross-reactivity with the fentanyl antibody between fentanyl and the fentanyl analogs examined, revealed order: fentanyl = butyrylfentanyl > (±)-cis-3-methylfentanyl > benzylfentanyl > alpha-methylfentanyl. High cross-reactivity may be the effect of the shape of the molecule — the shape of butyrfentanyl is closest to the original fentanyl molecule, which makes it easy to bind by fentanyl antibodies.

The opioid receptor affinity of fentanyl and its analogs was determined from their inhibitory potency in a binding assay with [3H] fentanyl as the radioligand. The K_{i} value for butyrfentanyl was 32 ± 4.1 nM. Comparing to fentanyl's K_{i} (1.06 ± 0.15 nM), butyrfentanyl's ability to displace [3H] fentanyl is low and it requires high concentrations of the drug.

Studies on urinary excretion revealed that almost all of the injected butyrfentanyl was excreted or metabolized within the first 3 hours after injection, and only very low concentrations were still detectable after 3 hours. Urinary concentrations of butyrylfentanyl from animals injected with 15 μg/kg and 45 μg/kg i.v. were measured by two techniques: radioreceptorassay and gas chromatography/mass spectrometry (GC/MS).

== Legal status ==
There was a proposal being discussed by the UN Commission on Narcotic Drugs (CND) to include butyrfentanyl in Schedule 1 of the 1961 Single Convention on Narcotic Drugs which was passed 16 March 2017.

=== United Kingdom ===
Butyrfentanyl is illegal in the United Kingdom as it is a modification of fentanyl "by replacement of the N-propionyl group by another acyl group".

=== United States ===
As of May 2016, butyrfentanyl is a Schedule I controlled substance in the United States.

=== China ===
As of October 2015, butyrfentanyl is a controlled substance in China.

=== Switzerland ===
Butyrfentanyl is illegal in Switzerland as of December 2015.

== See also ==
- 3-Methylbutyrfentanyl
- 4-Fluorobutyrfentanyl
- 4-Fluorofentanyl
- α-Methylfentanyl
- Acetylfentanyl
- Benzylfentanyl
- Furanylfentanyl
- Homofentanyl
- List of fentanyl analogues
