= C17H25NO2 =

The molecular formula C_{17}H_{25}NO_{2} (molar mass : 275.39 g/mol) may refer to:

- Magellanine
- Menthyl anthranilate
- 5-MeO-DiBF
- 3-MeO-PCMo
- Meprodine, Alpha-meprodine, Beta-meprodine
- Metethoheptazine
- N-Octyl bicycloheptene dicarboximide
- PCAA
- Proheptazine
- Trimeperidine
