= Meptazinol =

Opioid analgesic drug

Clinical data
- Trade names: Meptid
- AHFS/Drugs.com: International Drug Names
- Dependence liability: Low
- Routes of administration: By mouth, intramuscular, intravenous
- Drug class: Opioid
- ATC code: N02AX05 (WHO)

Legal status
- Legal status: AU: S4 (Prescription only); UK: POM (Prescription only)

Pharmacokinetic data
- Metabolism: The peak analgesic effect is seen within 30–60 minutes and lasts about 3–4 hours
- Elimination half-life: Half-life (1.4–4 hours)
- Excretion: The drug is rapidly metabolized to the glucuronide, and mostly excreted in the urine

Identifiers
- IUPAC name: (RS)-3-(3-Ethyl-1-methylazepan-3-yl)phenol
- CAS Number: 54340-58-8; HCl: 59263-76-2
- PubChem CID: 41049
- ChemSpider: 37469
- UNII: 18Y7S5JKZD; HCl: T62FQ4ZCPA
- KEGG: D08182
- ChEMBL: ChEMBL314437
- CompTox Dashboard (EPA): DTXSID6048543
- ECHA InfoCard: 100.053.718

Chemical and physical data
- Formula: C_{15}H_{23}NO
- Molar mass: 233.355 g·mol^{−1}
- 3D model (JSmol): Interactive image
- Chirality: Racemic mixture
- SMILES: OC1=CC=CC(C2(CCCCN(C2)C)CC)=C1
- InChI: InChI=1S/C15H23NO/c1-3-15(9-4-5-10-16(2)12-15)13-7-6-8-14(17)11-13/h6-8,11,17H,3-5,9-10,12H2,1-2H3; Key:JLICHNCFTLFZJN-UHFFFAOYSA-N

Meptazinol, sold under the brand name Meptid, is an opioid analgesic developed by Wyeth in the 1970s. Indications for use in moderate to severe pain, most commonly used to treat pain in obstetrics (childbirth).

Meptazinol is a 3-phenylazepane derivative, whereas the other phenazepanes like ethoheptazine and proheptazine are 4-phenylazepanes.

A partial μ-opioid receptor agonist, its mixed agonist/antagonist activity affords it a lower risk of dependence and abuse than full μ agonists like morphine. Meptazinol exhibits not only a short onset of action, but also a shorter duration of action relative to other opioids such as morphine, pentazocine, or buprenorphine.

== Related compounds ==
Meserine is a carbamate derivative of meptazinol.

Chemical structure of meserine
