= Propallylonal =

Barbiturate chemical compound

Clinical data
- Trade names: ?
- Other names: 5-isopropyl-5-(β-bromoallyl)barbituric acid
- ATC code: none

Legal status
- Legal status: AU: S9 (Prohibited substance); CA: Schedule IV; UK: POM (Prescription only); US: Schedule III controlled substance; controlled substance

Identifiers
- IUPAC name: 5-(2-bromoprop-2-en-1-yl)-5-isopropylpyrimidine-2,4,6(1H,3H,5H)-trione
- CAS Number: 545-93-7
- PubChem CID: 11020
- ChemSpider: 10554
- UNII: 1ER3Z9GUQH
- CompTox Dashboard (EPA): DTXSID00202906
- ECHA InfoCard: 100.008.088

Chemical and physical data
- Formula: C_{10}H_{13}BrN_{2}O_{3}
- Molar mass: 289.129 g·mol^{−1}
- 3D model (JSmol): Interactive image
- SMILES: O=C1NC(=O)NC(=O)C1(C(C)C)CC(\Br)=C
- InChI: InChI=1S/C10H13BrN2O3/c1-5(2)10(4-6(3)11)7(14)12-9(16)13-8(10)15/h5H,3-4H2,1-2H3,(H2,12,13,14,15,16); Key:KTGWBBOJAGDSHN-UHFFFAOYSA-N

Propallylonal is a barbiturate and central nervous system depressant synthesized in the 1920s, a derivative of barbituric acid.

== Effects ==
GABAergic positive allosteric modulationts as a central nervous system depressant, resulting in skeletal muscle relaxation, anxiety relief / tranquility, sedative, and hypnotic properties. In the United States, it was protected by drug patent 1622129 It has sedative, hypnotic and anticonvulsant properties, and is still rarely prescribed as a sleeping medication in some Eastern-European countries.

== Related medications ==
Other oxygenated barbiturate ("oxybarbiturates") are all sodium or acidic molecules derived from barbituric acid. This includes methohexital and Narconumal.
