= 4-Phenylazepane =

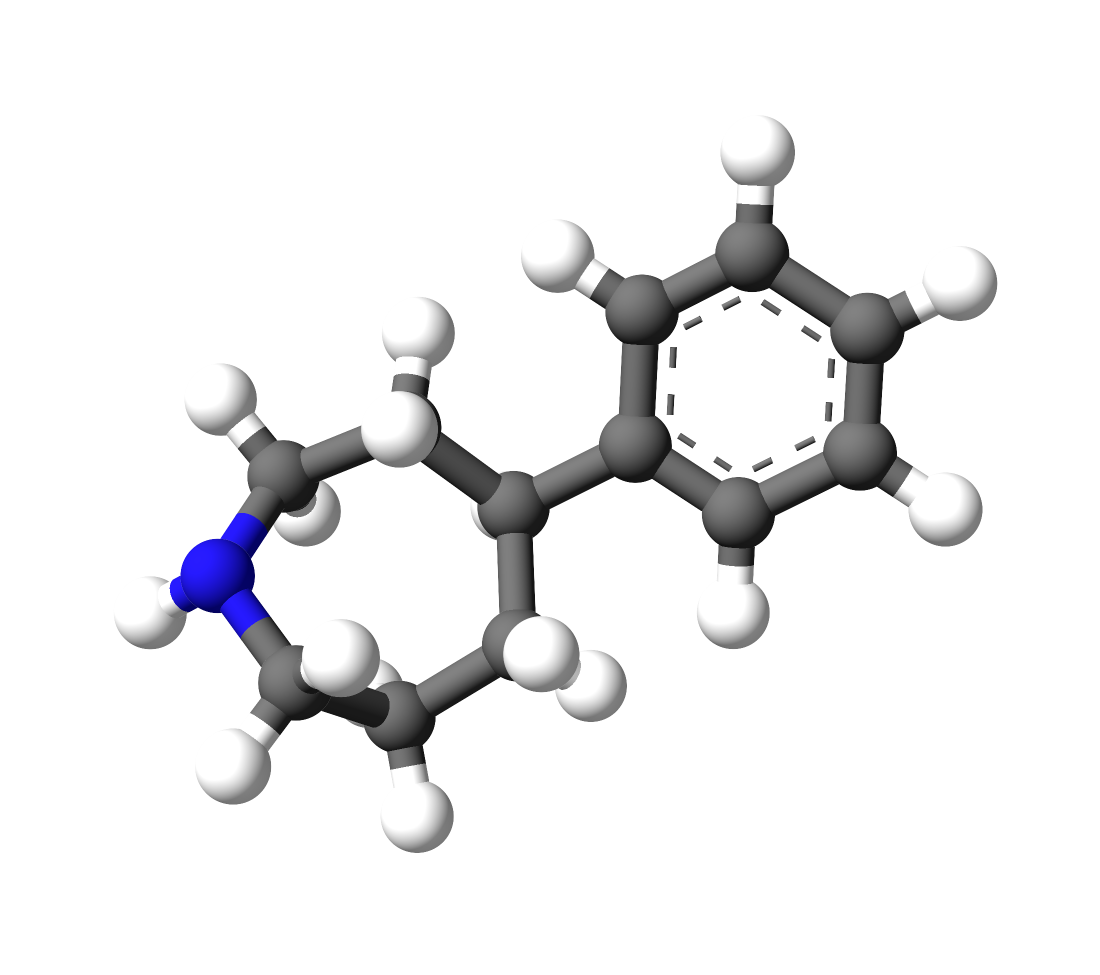

Names
- Preferred IUPAC name 4-Phenylazepane

Identifiers
CAS Number	73252-01-4; Hydrochloride: 7500-40-5
3D model (JSmol)	Interactive image; Hydrochloride: Interactive image
ChemSpider	385780; Hydrochloride: 23041709
ECHA InfoCard	100.230.814
PubChem CID	436210; Hydrochloride: 24200663
CompTox Dashboard (EPA)	DTXSID00993988
- InChI: InChI=1/C12H17N/c1-2-5-11(6-3-1)12-7-4-9-13-10-8-12/h1-3,5-6,12-13H,4,7-10H2 Key: AHKQOPMYYACTFC-UHFFFAOYSA-N; Hydrochloride: InChI=1S/C12H17N.ClH/c1-2-5-11(6-3-1)12-7-4-9-13-10-8-12;/h1-3,5-6,12-13H,4,7-10H2;1H Key: AZUFAMJWMHXXST-UHFFFAOYSA-N
- SMILES: c1c(cccc1)C2CCCNCC2; Hydrochloride: Cl.C=1C=CC(=CC1)C2CCNCCC2

Properties
Chemical formula	C_{12}H_{17}N
Molar mass	175.27 g/mol
- Except where otherwise noted, data are given for materials in their standard state (at 25 °C [77 °F], 100 kPa). verify (what is ?) Infobox references

4-Phenylazepane, also known as phenazepane, is a derivative of the cyclic amine azepane. It is a structural moiety in a series of opioid analgesics, including:

- Ethoheptazine
- Metheptazine
- Metethoheptazine
- Proheptazine

== See also ==
- 4-Phenylpiperidine
- Azepane
