= Controlled Drugs and Substances Act =

Canadian federal drug regulation act

Parliament of Canada
- Citation: S.C. 1996, c. 19
- Royal assent: 20 May 1996

Repeals
- Narcotic Control Act, Food and Drugs Act

Amended by
- Safe Streets and Communities Act, Cannabis Act
- Status: Amended

The Controlled Drugs and Substances Act (French: Loi réglementant certaines drogues et autres substances) is Canada's federal drug control statute. Passed in 1996 under Prime Minister Jean Chrétien's government, it repeals the Narcotic Control Act and Parts III and IV of the Food and Drugs Act, and establishes eight Schedules of controlled substances and two Classes of precursors. It provides that "The Governor in Council may, by order, amend any of Schedules I to VIII by adding to them or deleting from them any item or portion of an item, where the Governor in Council deems the amendment to be necessary in the public interest."

The Act serves as the implementing legislation for the Single Convention on Narcotic Drugs, the Convention on Psychotropic Substances, and the United Nations Convention Against Illicit Traffic in Narcotic Drugs and Psychotropic Substances.

== Amendments to the act ==
In November 2007, the Justice Minister Rob Nicholson introduced Bill C-26, which proposed a number of mandatory minimum penalties imposed on those who commit drug offences.

On 27 February 2009, Bill C-15, a re-introduction of C-26 received first reading in the second session of the 40th Parliament of Canada. On 9 June 2009, the House of Commons passed Bill C-15 and it went to the Senate for study and approval. On 14 December 2009, the Senate passed Bill C-15, with some amendments, for approval by the House of Commons. When the Canadian Parliament dissolved in a prorogation on 31 January 2010, Bill C-15, along with all unpassed legislation then tabled before the Commons, fell.

Early in 2012, the next parliament passed the Safe Streets and Communities Act, which received Royal Assent in March. The final legislation sees changes made to four areas of the Act, outlining mandatory minimum sentences for offences relating to the trafficking and production of various controlled substances. Mandatory minimum sentencing does not apply to simple possession and trafficking in smaller amounts.

On 17 October 2018, the federal Cannabis Act came into effect, legalizing the possession, sale and production of cannabis. Everyone with a criminal record for cannabis possession became eligible to apply for a pardon on this date.

== List of drugs ==
The list below reflects the list of drugs scheduled in Canada's Controlled Drugs and Substances Act.

=== Schedule I ===
- Opium Poppy (Papaver somniferum), its preparations, derivatives, alkaloids and salts, including:
1. Opium
2. Codeine (methylmorphine)
3. Morphine (7,8-didehydro-4,5-epoxy-17-methylmorphinan-3,6-diol)
4. Thebaine (paramorphine)
  and the salts, derivatives and salts of derivatives of the substances set out in subitems (1) to (4), including:
5. Acetorphine (acetyletorphine)
6. Acetyldihydrocodeine (4,5-epoxy-3-methoxy-17-methylmorphinan-6-ol acetate)
7. Benzylmorphine (7,8-didehydro-4,5-epoxy-17-methyl-3-(phenylmethoxy) morphinan-6-ol)
8. Codoxime (dihydrocodeinone O-(carboxymethyl) oxime)
9. Desomorphine (dihydrodeoxymorphine)
10. Diacetylmorphine (heroin)
11. Dihydrocodeine (4,5-epoxy-3-methoxy-17-methylmorphinan-6-ol)
12. Dihydromorphine (4,5-epoxy-17-methylmorphinan-3,6-diol)
13. Ethylmorphine (7,8-didehydro-4,5-epoxy-3-ethoxy-17-methylmorphinan-6-ol)
14. Etorphine (tetrahydro-7α-(1-hydroxy-1-methyl-butyl)-6,14-endo-ethenooripavine)
15. Hydrocodone (dihydrocodeinone)
16. Hydromorphinol (dihydro-14-hydroxymorphine)
17. Hydromorphone (dihydromorphinone)
18. Methyldesorphine (Δ6-deoxy-6-methylmorphine)
19. Methyldihydromorphine (dihydro-6-methylmorphine)
20. Metopon (dihydromethylmorphinone)
21. Morphine-N-oxide (morphine oxide)
22. Myrophine (benzylmorphine myristate)
23. Nalorphine (N-allylnormorphine)
24. Nicocodine (6-nicotinylcodeine)
25. Nicomorphine (dinicotinylmorphine)
26. Norcodeine (N-desmethylcodeine)
27. Normorphine (N-desmethylmorphine)
28. Oxycodone (dihydrohydroxycodeinone)
29. Oxymorphone (dihydrohydroxymorphinone)
30. Pholcodine (3-[2-(4-morpholinyl)ethyl]morphine)
31. Thebacon (acetyldihydrocodeinone)
  but not including:
1. Apomorphine (5,6,6a,7-tetrahydro-6-methyl-4H-dibenzo[de,g]quinoline-10,11-diol) and its salts
2. Cyprenorphine (N-(cyclopropylmethyl)-6,7,8,14-tetrahydro-7α-(1-hydroxy-1-methylethyl)-6,14-endo-ethenonororipavine) and its salts
3. Nalmefene (17-(cyclopropylmethyl)-4,5α-epoxy-6-methylenemorphinan-3,14-diol) and its salts
  1. Naloxone (4,5α-epoxy-3,14-dihydroxy-17-(2-propenyl)morphinan-6-one) and its salts
  2. Naltrexone (17-(cyclopropylmethyl)-4,5α-epoxy-3,14-dihydroxymorphinan-6-one) and its salts
  3. Methylnaltrexone (17-(cyclopropylmethyl)-4,5α-epoxy-3,14-dihydroxy-17-methyl-6-oxomorphinanium) and its salts
  4. Naloxegol (4,5α-epoxy-6α-(3,6,9,12,15,18,21-heptaoxadocos-1-yloxy)-17-(2-propenyl)morphinan-3,14-diol) and its salts
4. Narcotine (6,7-dimethoxy-3-(5,6,7,8-tetra-hydro-4-methoxy-6-methyl-1,3-dioxolos [4,5-g]isoquinolin-5-yl)-1(3H)-isobenzofuranone) and its salts
5. Papaverine (1-[(3,4-dimethoxyphenyl)methyl]-6,7-dimethoxyisoquinoline) and its salts
6. Poppy seed
- Coca (Erythroxylon), its preparations, derivatives, alkaloids and salts, including:
1. Coca leaves
2. Cocaine (benzoylmethylecgonine)
3. Ecgonine (3-hydroxy-2-tropane carboxylic acid)
  but not including:
4. ^{123}l-ioflupane
- Phenylpiperidines, their intermediates, salts, derivatives and analogues and salts of intermediates, derivatives and analogues, including:
1. Allylprodine (3-allyl-1-methyl-4-phenyl-4-piperidinol propionate)
2. Alphameprodine (α-3-ethyl-1-methyl-4-phenyl-4-piperidinol propionate)
3. Alphaprodine (α-1,3-dimethyl-4-phenyl-4-piperidinol propionate)
4. Anileridine (ethyl 1-[2-(p-aminophenyl)ethyl]-4-phenylpiperidine-4-carboxylate)
5. Betameprodine (β-3-ethyl-1-methyl-4-phenyl-4-piperidinol propionate)
6. Betaprodine (β-1,3-dimethyl-4-phenyl-4-piperidinol propionate)
7. Benzethidine (ethyl 1-(2-benzyloxyethyl)-4-phenylpiperidine-4-carboxylate)
8. Diphenoxylate (ethyl 1-(3-cyano-3,3-diphenylpropyl)-4-phenylpiperidine-4-carboxylate)
9. Difenoxin (1-(3-cyano-3,3-diphenylpropyl)-4-phenylpiperidine-4-carboxylate)
10. Etoxeridine (ethyl 1-[2-(2-hydroxyethoxy) ethyl]-4-phenylpiperidine-4-carboxylate)
11. Furethidine (ethyl 1-(2-tetrahydrofurfury loxyethyl)-4-phenylpiperidine-4-carboxylate)
12. Hydroxypethidine (ethyl 4-(m-hydroxyphenyl)-1-methylpiperidine-4-carboxylate)
13. Ketobemidone (1-[4-(m-hydroxyphenyl)-1-methyl-4-piperidyl]-1-propanone)
14. Methylphenylisonipecotonitrile (4-cyano-1-methyl-4-phenylpiperidine)
15. Morpheridine (ethyl 1-(2-morpholinoethyl)-4-phenylpiperidine-4-carboxylate)
16. Norpethidine (ethyl 4-phenylpiperidine-4-carboxylate)
17. Pethidine (ethyl 1-methyl-4-phenylpiperidine-4-carboxylate)
18. Phenoperidine (ethyl 1-(3-hydroxy-3-phenylpropyl)-4-phenylpiperidine-4-carboxylate)
19. Piminodine (ethyl 1-[3-(phenylamino)propyl]-4-phenylpiperidine-4-carboxylate)
20. Properidine (isopropyl 1-methyl-4-phenylpiperidine-4-carboxylate)
21. Trimeperidine (1,2,5-trimethyl-4-phenyl-4-piperidinol propionate)
22. Pethidine Intermediate C (1-methyl-4-phenylpiperidine-4-carboxylate)
  but not including:
1. Carbamethidine (ethyl 1-(2-carbamylethyl)-4-phenylpiperidine-4-carboxylate) and its salts
2. Oxpheneridine (ethyl 1-(2-hydroxy-2-phenylethyl)-4-phenylpiperidine-4-carboxylate) and its salts
- Phenazepines, their salts, derivatives and salts of derivatives including:
1. Proheptazine (hexahydro-1,3-dimethyl-4-phenyl-1H-azepin-4-ol propionate)
  but not including:
1. Ethoheptazine (ethyl hexahydro-1-methyl-4-phenyl-azepine-4-carboxylate) and its salts
2. Metethoheptazine (ethyl hexahydro-1,3-dimethyl-4-phenylazepine-4-carboxylate) and its salts
3. Metheptazine (methyl hexahydro-1,2-dimethyl-4-phenylazepine-4-carboxylate) and its salts
- Amidones, their intermediates, salts, derivatives and salts of intermediates and derivatives including:
1. Dimethylaminodiphenylbutanonitrile (4-cyano-2-dimethylamino-4,4-diphenylbutane)
2. Dipipanone (4,4-diphenyl-6-piperidino-3-heptanone)
3. Isomethadone (6-dimethylamino-5-methyl-4,4-diphenyl-3-hexanone)
4. Methadone (6-dimethylamino-4,4-diphenyl-3-heptanone)
5. Normethadone (6-dimethylamino-4,4-diphenyl-3-hexanone)
6. Norpipanone (4,4-diphenyl-6-piperidino-3-hexanone)
7. Phenadoxone (6-morpholino-4,4-diphenyl-3-heptanone)
- Methadols, their salts, derivatives and salts of derivatives including:
1. Acetylmethadol (6-dimethylamino-4,4-diphenyl-3-heptanol acetate)
2. Alphacetylmethadol (α-6-dimethylamino-4,4-diphenyl-3-heptanol acetate)
3. Alphamethadol (α-6-dimethylamino-4,4-diphenyl-3-heptanol)
4. Betacetylmethadol (β-6-dimethylamino-4,4-diphenyl-3-heptanol acetate)
5. Betamethadol (β-6-dimethylamino-4,4-diphenyl-3-heptanol)
6. Dimepheptanol (6-dimethylamino-4,4-diphenyl-3-heptanol)
7. Noracymethadol (α-6-methylamino-4,4-diphenyl-3-heptanol acetate)
- Phenalkoxams, their salts, derivatives and salts of derivatives including:
1. Dimenoxadol (dimethylaminoethyl 1-ethoxy-1,1-diphenylacetate)
2. Dioxaphetyl butyrate (ethyl 2,2-diphenyl-4-morpholinobutyrate)
3. Dextropropoxyphene ([S-(R*,S*)]-α-[2-(dimethylamino)-1-methylethyl]-α-phenylbenzeneethanol, propanoate ester)
- Thiambutenes, their salts, derivatives and salts of derivatives including:
1. Diethylthiambutene (N,N-diethyl-1-methyl-3,3-di-2-thienylallylamine)
2. Dimethylthiambutene (N,N,1-trimethyl-3,3-di-2-thienylallylamine)
3. Ethylmethylthiambutene (N-ethyl-N,1-dimethyl-3,3-di-2-thienylallylamine)
- Moramides, their intermediates, salts, derivatives and salts of intermediates and derivatives including:
1. Dextromoramide (d-1-(3-methyl-4-morpholino-2,2-diphenylbutyryl)pyrrolidine)
2. Diphenylmorpholinoisovaleric acid (2-methyl-3-morpholino-1,1-diphenylpropionic acid)
3. Levomoramide (l-1-(3-methyl-4-morpholino-2,2-diphenylbutyryl)pyrrolidine)
4. Racemoramide (d,l-1-(3-methyl-4-morpholino-2,2-diphenylbutyryl) pyrrolidine)
- Morphinans, their salts, derivatives and salts of derivatives including:
1. Buprenorphine (17-(cyclopropylmethyl)-α-(1,1-dimethylethyl)-4,5-epoxy-18,19-dihydro-3-hydroxy-6-methoxy-α-methyl-6,14-ethenomorphinan-7-methanol)
2. Drotebanol (6β,14-dihydroxy-3,4-dimethoxy-17-methylmorphinan)
3. Levomethorphan (l-3-methoxy-17-methylmorphinan)
4. Levorphanol (l-3-hydroxy-17-methylmorphinan)
5. Levophenacylmorphan (l-3-hydroxy-17-phenacylmorphinan)
6. Norlevorphanol (l-3-hydroxymorphinan)
7. Phenomorphan (3-hydroxy-17-(2-phenylethyl)morphinan)
8. Racemethorphan (d,1-3-methoxy-17-methylmorphinan)
9. Racemorphan (d,l-3-hydroxy-N-methylmorphinan)
  but not including:
1. Dextromethorphan (d-1,2,3,9,10,10a-hexahydro-6-methoxy-11-methyl-4H-10,4a-iminoethano-phenanthren) and its salts
2. Dextrorphan (d-1,2,3,9,10,10a-hexahydro-11-methyl-4H-10,4a-iminoethanophenanthren-6-ol) and its salts
3. Levallorphan (l-11-allyl-1,2,3,9,10,10a-hexahydro-4H-10,4a-iminoethanophenanthren-6-ol) and its salts
4. Levargorphan (l-11-propargyl-1,2,3,9,10,10a-hexahydro-4H-10,4a-iminoethanophenanthren-6-ol) and its salts
5. Butorphanol (17-(cyclobutylmethyl)morphinan-3,14-diol) and its salts
6. Nalbuphine (17-(cyclobutylmethyl)-4,5α-epoxymorphinan-3,6α, 14-triol) and its salts
- Benzazocines, their salts, derivatives and salts of derivatives including:
1. Phenazocine (1,2,3,4,5,6-hexahydro-6,11-dimethyl-3-phenethyl-2,6-methano-3-benzazocin-8-ol)
2. Metazocine (1,2,3,4,5,6-hexahydro-3,6,11-trimethyl-2,6-methano-3-benzazocin-8-ol)
3. Pentazocine (1,2,3,4,5,6-hexahydro-6,11-dimethyl-3-(3-methyl-2-butenyl)-2,6-methano-3-benzazocin-8-ol)
  but not including:
1. Cyclazocine (1,2,3,4,5,6-hexahydro-6,11-dimethyl-3-(cyclopropylmethyl)-2,6-methano-3-benzazocin-8-ol) and its salts
- Ampromides, their salts, derivatives and salts of derivatives including:
1. Diampromide (N-[2-(methylphenethylamino)propyl] propionanilide)
2. Phenampromide (N-(1-methyl-2-piperidino) ethyl) propionanilide)
3. Propiram (N-(1-methyl-2-piperidinoethyl)-N-2-pyridylpropionamide)
- Benzimidazoles, their salts, derivatives and salts of derivatives including:
1. Clonitazene (2-(p-chlorobenzyl)-1-diethylaminoethyl-5-nitrobenzimidazole)
2. Etonitazene (2-(p-ethoxybenzyl)-1-diethylaminoethyl-5-nitrobenzimidazole)
3. Bezitramide (1-(3-cyano-3,3-diphenylpropyl)-4-(2-oxo-3-propionyl-1-benzimidazolinyl)-piperidine)
- Phencyclidine (1-(1-phenylcyclohexyl)piperidine), its salts, derivatives and analogues and salts of derivatives and analogues, including:
1. Ketamine (2-(2-chlorophenyl)-2-(methylamino)cyclohexanone)
- Piritramide (1-(3-cyano-3,3-diphenylpropyl)-4-(1-piperidino)piperidine-4-carboxylic acid amide), its salts, derivatives and salts of derivatives
- Fentanyls, their salts, derivatives, and analogues and salts of derivatives and analogues, including:
1. Acetyl-α-methylfentanyl (N-[1-(α-methylphenethyl)-4-piperidyl] acetanilide)
2. Alfentanil (N-[1-[2-(4-ethyl-4,5-dihydro-5-oxo-1H-tetrazol-1-yl)ethyl]-4-(methoxymethyl)-4-piperidyl]propionanilide)
3. Carfentanil (methyl 4-[(1-oxopropyl)phenylamino]-1-(2-phenethyl)-4-piperidinecarboxylate)
4. p-Fluorofentanyl (4′fluoro-N-(1-phenethyl-4-piperidyl) propionanilide)
5. Fentanyl (N-(1-phenethyl-4-piperidyl) propionanilide)
6. β-Hydroxyfentanyl (N-[1-(β-hydroxyphenethyl)-4-piperidyl] propionanilide)
7. β-Hydroxy-3-methylfentanyl (N-[1-(β-hydroxyphenethyl)-3-methyl-4-piperidyl] propionanilide)
8. α-Methylfentanyl (N-[1-(α-methylphenethyl)-4-piperidyl] propionanilide)
9. α-Methylthiofentanyl (N-[1-[1-methyl-2-(2-thienyl) ethyl]-4-piperidyl] propionanilide)
10. 3-Methylfentanyl (N-(3-methyl-1-phenethyl-4-piperidyl) propionanilide)
11. 3-Methylthiofentanyl (N-[3-methyl-1-[2-(2-thienyl) ethyl]-4-piperidyl] propionanilide)
  1. Remifentanil (dimethyl 4-carboxy-4-(N-phenylpropionamido)-1-piperidinepropionate)
12. Sufentanil (N-[4-(methoxymethyl)-1-[2-(2-thienyl)ethyl]-4-piperidyl] propionanilide)
13. Thiofentanyl (N-[1-[2-(2-thienyl)ethyl]-4-piperidyl] propionanilide)
- Tilidine (ethyl2-(dimethylamino)-1-phenyl-3-cyclohexene-1-carboxylate), its salts, derivatives and salts of derivatives
1. Methylenedioxypyrovalerone (MDPV), its salts, derivatives, isomers and analogues and salts of derivatives, isomers and analogues
- Methamphetamine (N,α-dimethylbenzeneethanamine), its salts, derivatives, isomers and analogues and salts of derivatives, isomers and analogues
- Amphetamines, their salts, derivatives, isomers and analogues and salts of derivatives, isomers and analogues including:
1. Amphetamine (α-methylbenzene-ethanamine)
2. N-ethylamphetamine (N-ethyl-α-methylbenzeneethanamine)
3. 4-methyl-2,5-dimethoxyamphetamine (STP) (2,5-dimethoxy-4,α-dimethylbenzeneethanamine)
4. 3,4-Methylenedioxyamphetamine (MDA) (α-methyl-1,3-benzodioxole-5-ethanamine)
5. 2,5-dimethoxyamphetamine (2,5-dimethoxy-α-methylbenzene-ethanamine)
6. 4-methoxyamphetamine (4-methoxy-α-methylbenzeneethanamine)
7. 2,4,5-trimethoxyamphetamine (2,4,5-trimethoxy-α-methylbenzeneethanamine)
8. N-methyl-3,4-methylenedioxy- amphetamine (N,α-dimethyl-1,3-benzodioxole-5-ethanamine)
9. 4-ethoxy-2,5-dimethoxyamphetamine (4-ethoxy-2,5-dimethoxy-α-methylbenzeneethanamine)
10. 5-methoxy-3,4-methylenedioxy- amphetamine (7-methoxy-α-methyl-1,3-benzodioxole-5-ethanamine)
11. N,N-dimethyl-3,4-methylenedioxyamphetamine (N,N, α-trimethyl-1,3-benzodioxole-5-ethanamine)
12. N-ethyl-3,4-methylenedioxyamphetamine (N-ethyl-α-methyl-1,3-benzodioxole-5-ethanamine)
13. 4-ethyl-2,5-dimethoxyamphetamine (DOET) (4-ethyl-2,5-dimethoxy-α-methylbenzeneethanamine)
14. 4-bromo-2,5-dimethoxyamphetamine (4-bromo-2,5-dimethoxy-α-methylbenzeneethanamine)
15. 4-chloro-2,5-dimethoxyamphetamine (4-chloro-2,5-dimethoxy-α-methyl-benzeneethanamine)
16. 4-ethoxyamphetamine (4-ethoxy-α-methylbenzeneethanamine)
17. Benzphetamine (N-benzyl-N,α-dimethylbenzeneethanamine)
18. N-Propyl-3,4-methylenedioxy- amphetamine (α-methyl-N-propyl-1,3-benzodioxole-5-ethanamine)
19. N-(2-Hydroxyethyl)-α-meth-ylbenzeneethanamine
20. N-hydroxy-3,4-methylenedioxy- amphetamine (N-[α-methyl-3,4-(methylenedioxy)phenethyl]hydroxylamine)
21. 3,4,5-trimethoxyamphetamine (3,4,5-trimethoxy-α-methylbenzeneethanamine)
- Flunitrazepam (5-(o-fluorophenyl)-1,3-dihydro-1-methyl-7-nitro-2H-1,4-benzodiazepin-2-one) and any of its salts or derivatives
- 4-hydroxybutanoic acid (GHB) and any of its salts
- Tapentadol (3-[(1R,2R)-3-(dimethylamino)-1-ethyl-2-methylpropyl]-phenol), its salts, derivatives and isomers and salts of derivatives and isomers
- AH-7921 (1-(3,4-dichlorobenzamidomethyl)cyclohexyldimethylamine), its salts, isomers and salts of isomers
- MT-45 (1-cyclohexyl-4-(1,2-diphenylethyl)piperazine), its salts, derivatives, isomers and analogues and salts of derivatives, isomers and analogues, including:
1. Diphenidine (DEP) (1-(1,2-diphenylethyl)piperidine)
2. Methoxphenidine (2-MeO-Diphenidine, MXP) (1-[1-(2-methoxyphenyl)-2-phenylethyl]piperidine)
3. Ephenidine (NEDPA, EPE) (N-ethyl-1,2-diphenylethylamine)
4. Isophenidine (NPDPA) (N-isopropyl-1,2-diphenylethylamine)
  but not including:
1. Lefetamine ((-)-N,N-dimethyl-α-phenylbenzeneethanamine), its salts, derivatives and isomers and salts of derivatives and isomers
- W-18 (-chloro-N-[1-[2-(4-nitrophenyl)ethyl]-2-piperidinylidene]benzenesulfonamide), its salts, derivatives, isomers and analogues and salts of derivatives, isomers and analogues
- U-47700 (3,4-dichloro-N-(2-(dimethylamino)cyclohexyl)-N-methylbenzamide), its salts, derivatives, isomers and analogues, and salts of derivatives, isomers and analogues, including:
1. Bromadoline (4-bromo-N-(2-(dimethylamino)cyclohexyl)benzamide)
2. U-47109 (3,4-dichloro-N-(2-(dimethylamino)cyclohexyl)benzamide)
3. U-48520 (4-chloro-N-(2-(dimethylamino)cyclohexyl)-N-methylbenzamide)
4. U-50211 (N-(2-(dimethylamino)cyclohexyl)-4-hydroxy-N-methylbenzamide)
5. U-77891 (3,4-dibromo-N-methyl-N-(1-methyl-1-azaspiro[4.5]decan-6-yl)benzamide)
- Tramadol (2-[(dimethylamino)methyl]-1-(3-methoxyphenyl)cyclohexanol), its salts, isomers and salts of isomers and the following derivatives of tramadol and the salts, isomers and salts of isomers of those derivatives:
1. O-desmethyltramadol (3-[2-[(dimethylamino)methyl]-1-hydroxycyclohexyl]-phenol)
2. N,O-didesmethyltramadol (3-[1-hydroxy-2-[(methylamino)methyl]cyclohexyl]-phenol)

=== Schedule II ===
1. Synthetic cannabinoid receptor type 1 agonists, their salts, derivatives, isomers, and salts of derivatives and isomers – with the exception of any substance that is identical to any phytocannabinoid and with the exception of ((3S)-2,3-dihydro-5-methyl-3-(4-morpholinylmethyl)pyrrolo[1,2,3-de]-1,4-benzoxazin-6-yl)-1-naphthalenyl-methanone (WIN 55,212-3) and its salts – including those that fall within the following core chemical structure classes:
  1. Any substance that has a 2-(cyclohexyl)phenol structure with substitution at the 1-position of the benzene ring by a hydroxy, ether or ester group and further substituted at the 5-position of the benzene ring, whether or not further substituted on the benzene ring to any extent, and substituted at the 3'-position of the cyclohexyl ring by an alkyl, carbonyl, hydroxyl, ether or ester, and whether or not further substituted on the cyclohexyl ring to any extent, including
    1. Nabilone ((±)-trans-3-(1,1-dimethylheptyl)-6,6a,7,8,10,10a-hexahydro-1-hydroxy-6,6-dimethyl-9H-dibenzo[b,d]pyran-9-one)
    2. Parahexyl (3-hexyl-6,6,9-trimethyl-7,8,9,10-tetrahydro-6H-dibenzo[b,d]pyran-1-ol)
    3. 3-(1,2-dimethylheptyl)-7,8,9,10-tetrahydro-6,6,9-trimethyl-6H-dibenzo[b,d]pyran-1-ol (DMHP)
    4. 5-(1,1-dimethylheptyl)-2-(5-hydroxy-2-(3-hydroxypropyl)cyclohexyl)phenol (CP 55,940)
    5. 5-(1,1-dimethylheptyl)-2-(3-hydroxycyclohexyl)phenol (CP 47,497)
  2. Any substance that has a 3-(1-naphthoyl)indole structure with substitution at the nitrogen atom of the indole ring, whether or not further substituted on the indole ring to any extent and whether or not substituted on the naphthyl ring to any extent, including
    1. 1-pentyl-3-(1-naphthoyl)indole (JWH-018)
    2. 1-butyl-3-(1-naphthoyl)indole (JWH-073)
    3. 1-pentyl-3-(4-methyl-1-naphthoyl)indole (JWH-122)
    4. 1-hexyl-3-(1-naphthoyl)indole (JWH-019)
    5. 1-(4-pentenyl)-3-(1-naphthoyl)indole (JWH-022)
    6. 1-butyl-3-(4-methoxy-1-naphthoyl)indole (JWH-080)
    7. 1-pentyl-3-(4-methoxy-1-naphthoyl)indole (JWH-081)
    8. 1-(2-morpholin-4-ylethyl)-3-(1-naphthoyl)indole (JWH-200)
    9. 1-pentyl-3-(4-ethyl-1-naphthoyl)indole (JWH-210)
    10. 1-pentyl-3-(2-methoxy-1-naphthoyl)indole (JWH-267)
    11. 1-[(N-methylpiperidin-2-yl)methyl]-3-(1-naphthoyl)indole (AM-1220)
    12. 1-(5-fluoropentyl)-3-(1-naphthoyl)indole (AM-2201)
    13. 1-(5-fluoropentyl)-3-(4-methyl-1-naphthoyl)indole (MAM-2201)
    14. 1-(5-fluoropentyl)-3-(4-ethyl-1-naphthoyl)indole (EAM-2201)
    15. ((3R)-2,3-dihydro-5-methyl-3-(4-morpholinylmethyl)pyrrolo[1,2,3-de]-1,4-benzoxazin-6-yl)-1-naphthalenyl-methanone (WIN 55,212-2)
  3. Any substance that has a 3-(1-naphthoyl)pyrrole structure with substitution at the nitrogen atom of the pyrrole ring, whether or not further substituted on the pyrrole ring to any extent and whether or not substituted on the naphthyl ring to any extent, including
    1. 1-pentyl-5-(2-fluorophenyl)-3-(1-naphthoyl)pyrrole (JWH-307)
  4. Any substance that has a 3-phenylacetylindole structure with substitution at the nitrogen atom of the indole ring, whether or not further substituted on the indole ring to any extent and whether or not substituted on the phenyl ring to any extent, including
    1. 1-pentyl-3-(2-methoxyphenylacetyl)indole (JWH-250)
    2. 1-pentyl-3-(2-methylphenylacetyl)indole (JWH-251)
    3. 1-pentyl-3-(3-methoxyphenylacetyl)indole (JWH-302)
  5. Any substance that has a 3-benzoylindole structure with substitution at the nitrogen atom of the indole ring, whether or not further substituted on the indole ring to any extent and whether or not substituted on the phenyl ring to any extent, including
    1. 1-(1-methylpiperidin-2-ylmethyl)-3-(2-iodobenzoyl)indole (AM-2233)
  6. Any substance that has a 3-methanone(cyclopropyl)indole structure with substitution at the nitrogen atom of the indole ring, whether or not further substituted on the indole ring to any extent and whether or not substituted on the cyclopropyl ring to any extent, including
    1. (1-pentyl-1H-indol-3-yl)(2,2,3,3-tetramethylcyclopropyl)-methanone (UR-144)
    2. (1-(5-fluoropentyl)-1H-indol-3-yl)(2,2,3,3-tetramethylcyclopropyl)-methanone (5F-UR-144)
    3. (1-(2-(4-morpholinyl)ethyl)-1H-indol-3-yl)(2,2,3,3-tetramethylcyclopropyl)-methanone (A-796,260)
  7. Any substance that has a quinolin-8-yl 1H-indole-3-carboxylate structure with substitution at the nitrogen atom of the indole ring, whether or not further substituted on the indole ring to any extent and whether or not substituted on the quinolin-8-yl ring to any extent, including
    1. 1-pentyl-8-quinolinyl ester-1H-indole-3-carboxylic acid (PB-22)
    2. 1-(5-fluoropentyl)-8-quinolinyl ester-1H-indole-3-carboxylic acid (5F-PB-22)
  8. Any substance that has a 3-carboxamideindazole structure with substitution at the nitrogen atom of the indazole ring, whether or not further substituted on the indazole ring to any extent and whether or not substituted at the carboxamide group to any extent, including
    1. N-(adamantan-1-yl)-1-pentyl-1H-indazole-3-carboxamide (AKB48)
    2. N-(adamantan-1-yl)-1-(5-fluoropentyl)-1H-indazole-3-carboxamide (5F-AKB48)
    3. N-(1-(aminocarbonyl)-2-methylpropyl)-1-(4-fluorobenzyl)-1H-indazole-3-carboxamide (AB-FUBINACA)
    4. N-(1-amino-3-methyl-1-oxobutan-2-yl)-1-pentyl-1H-indazole-3-carboxamide (AB-PINACA)
  9. Any substance that has a 3-carboxamideindole structure with substitution at the nitrogen atom of the indole ring, whether or not further substituted on the indole ring to any extent and whether or not substituted at the carboxamide group to any extent, including
    1. N-(adamantan-1-yl)-1-fluoropentylindole-3-carboxamide (STS-135)
    2. N-(adamantan-1-yl)-1-pentylindole-3-carboxamide (APICA)

=== Schedule III ===
1. Methylphenidate (α-phenyl-2-piperidineacetic acid methyl ester) and any salts, derivatives, isomers, and analogues and salts of derivatives, isomers, and analogues, including:
  1. Ethylphenidate (ethyl 2-phenyl-2-(piperidin-2-yl)acetate)
  2. Isopropylphenidate (isopropyl 2-phenyl-2-(piperidin-2-yl)acetate)
  3. Propylphenidate (propyl 2-phenyl-2-(piperidin-2-yl)acetate)
  4. 3,4-Dichloromethylphenidate (methyl 2-(3,4-dichlorophenyl)-2-(piperidin-2-yl)acetate)
  5. 4-Methylmethylphenidate (methyl 2-(4-methylphenyl)-2-(piperidin-2-yl)acetate)
  6. 4-Fluoromethylphenidate (methyl 2-(4-fluorophenyl)-2-(piperidin-2-yl)acetate)
  7. Methylnaphthidate (methyl 2-(naphthalen-2-yl)-2-(piperidin-2-yl)acetate)
  8. Ethylnaphthidate (ethyl 2-(naphthalen-2-yl)-2-(piperidin-2-yl)acetate)
2. Methaqualone (2-methyl-3-(2-methylphenyl)-4(3H)-quinazolinone) and any salt thereof
3. Mecloqualone (2-methyl-3-(2-chlorophenyl)-4(3H)-quinazolinone) and any salt thereof
4. LSD (lysergic acid diethylamide) (N,N-diethyllysergamide) and any salt thereof
5. DET (N,N-Diethyltryptamine) (3-[(2-diethylamino) ethyl]indole) and any salt thereof
6. DMT (N,N-Dimethyltryptamine) (3-[(2-dimethylamino) ethyl]indole) and any salt thereof
7. JB-336 (N-Methyl-3-piperidyl benzilate or LBJ) (3-[(hydroxydiphenylacetyl)oxy]-1-methylpiperidine) and any salt thereof
8. Harmaline (4,9-dihydro-7-methoxy-1-methyl-3H-pyrido(3,4-b)indole) and any salt thereof
9. Harmalol (4,9-dihydro-1-methyl-3H-pyrido(3,4-b)indol-7-ol) and any salt thereof
10. Psilocin (3-[2-(dimethylamino)ethyl]-4-hydroxyindole) and any salt thereof
11. Psilocybin (3-[2-(dimethylamino)ethyl]-4-phosphoryloxyindole) and any salt thereof
12. PCE (N-(1-phenylcyclohexyl)ethylamine) and any salt thereof
13. TCP (1-[1-(2-Thienyl) cyclohexyl]piperidine) and any salt thereof
14. PCPr (1-Phenyl-N-propylcyclohexanamine) and any salt thereof
15. Rolicyclidine (1-(1-phenylcyclohexyl) pyrrolidine) and any salt thereof
16. Mescaline (3,4,5-trimethoxybenzeneethanamine) and any salt thereof, but not peyote (lophophora)
17. 4-Methylaminorex (4,5-dihydro-4-methyl-5-phenyl-2-oxazolamine) and any salt thereof
18. Cathinone ((-)-α-aminopropiophenone) and any salt thereof
19. Fenetylline (d,l-3,7-dihydro-1,3-dimethyl-7-(2-[(1-methyl-2-phenethyl)amino]ethyl)-1H-purine-2, 6-dione) and any salt thereof
20. Methcathinone (2-Methylamino-1-phenyl-1-propanone) and any salt thereof
21. Benzylcyclidine (1-[1-(Phenylmethyl)cyclohexyl]piperidine) and any salt thereof
22. 4-Methyl-PCP (1-[1-(4-Methylphenyl)cyclohexyl]piperidine) and any salt thereof
23. [Repealed, SOR/2016-73, s. 1]
24. [Repealed, 2012, c. 1, s. 46]
25. [Repealed, 2012, c. 1, s. 46]
26. Aminorex (4,5-dihydro-5-phenyl-2-oxazolamine) and any salt thereof
27. Etryptamine (3-(2-aminobutyl)indole) and any salt thereof
28. Lefetamine ((-)-N,N-dimethyl-α-phenylbenzeneethanamine) and any salt thereof
29. Mesocarb (3-(α-methylphenethyl)-N-(phenylcarbamoyl)sydnone imine) and any salt thereof
30. Zipeprol (4-(2-methoxy-2-phenylethyl)-α-(methoxyphenylmethyl)-1-piperazineethanol) and any salt thereof
31. Amineptine (7-[(10,11-dihydro-5H-dibenzo[a,d]cyclohepten-5-yl)amino]heptanoic acid) and any salt thereof
32. BZP (Benzylpiperazine) (1-benzylpiperazine) and its salts, isomers and salts of isomers
33. TFMPP (Trifluoromethylphenylpiperazine) (1-(3-trifluoromethylphenyl)piperazine) and its salts, isomers and salts of isomers
34. 2C-phenethylamines and their salts, derivatives, isomers and salts of derivatives and isomers that correspond to the following chemical description:
  any substance that has a 1-amino-2-phenylethane structure substituted at the 2' and 5' or 2' and 6' positions of the benzene ring by an alkoxy or haloalkoxy group, or substituted at two adjacent carbon atoms of the benzene ring which results in the formation of a furan, dihydrofuran, pyran, dihydropyran or methylenedioxy group—whether or not further substituted on the benzene ring to any extent, whether or not substituted at the amino group by one or two, or a combination of, methyl, ethyl, propyl, isopropyl, hydroxyl, benzyl (or benzyl substituted to any extent) or benzylene (or benzylene substituted to any extent) groups and whether or not substituted at the 2-ethyl (beta carbon) position by a hydroxyl, oxo or alkoxy group—and its salts and derivatives and salts of derivatives, including:
1. 4-bromo-2,5-dimethoxy-N-(2-methoxybenzyl)phenethylamine (25B-NBOMe)
2. 4-chloro-2,5-dimethoxy-N-(2-methoxybenzyl)phenethylamine (25C-NBOMe)
3. 4-iodo-2,5-dimethoxy-N-(2-methoxybenzyl)phenethylamine (25I-NBOMe)
4. 4-bromo-2,5-dimethoxybenzeneethanamine (2C-B)

=== Schedule IV ===
- Barbiturates, their salts and derivatives including
1. Allobarbital (5,5-diallylbarbituric acid)
2. Alphenal (5-allyl-5-phenylbarbituric acid)
3. Amobarbital (5-ethyl-5-(3-methylbutyl)barbituric acid)
4. Aprobarbital (5-allyl-5-isopropylbarbituric acid)
5. Barbital (5,5-diethylbarbituric acid)
6. [Repealed, SOR/2017-13, s. 7]
7. Butabarbital (5-sec-butyl-5-ethylbarbituric acid)
8. Butalbital (5-allyl-5-isobutylbarbituric acid)
9. Butallylonal (5-(2-bromoallyl)-5-sec-butylbarbituric acid)
10. Butethal (5-butyl-5-ethylbarbituric acid)
11. Cyclobarbital (5-(1-cyclohexen-1-yl)-5-ethylbarbituric acid)
12. Cyclopal (5-allyl-5-(2-cyclopenten-1-yl)barbituric acid)
13. Heptabarbital (5-(1-cyclohepten-1-yl)-5-ethylbarbituric acid)
14. Hexethal (5-ethyl-5-hexylbarbituric acid)
15. Hexobarbital (5-(1-cyclohexen-1-yl)-1,5-dimethylbarbituric acid)
16. Mephobarbital (5-ethyl-1-methyl-5-phenylbarbituric acid)
17. Methabarbital (5,5-diethyl-1-methylbarbituric acid)
18. Methylphenobarbital (5-ethyl-1-methyl-5-phenylbarbituric acid)
19. Propallylonal (5-(2-bromoallyl)-5-isopropylbarbituric acid)
20. Pentobarbital (5-ethyl-5-(1-methylbutyl)barbituric acid)
21. Phenobarbital (5-ethyl-5-phenylbarbituric acid)
22. Probarbital (5-ethyl-5-isopropylbarbituric acid)
23. Phenylmethylbarbituric acid (5-methyl-5-phenylbarbituric acid)
24. Secobarbital (5-allyl-5-(1-methylbutyl)barbituric acid)
25. Sigmodal (5-(2-bromoallyl)-5-(1-methylbutyl) barbituric acid)
26. Talbutal (5-allyl-5-sec-butylbarbituric acid)
27. Vinbarbital (5-ethyl-5-(1-methyl-1-butenyl)barbituric acid)
28. Vinylbital (5-(1-methylbutyl)-5-vinylbarbituric acid)
  but not including:
29. Barbituric acid (2,4,6(1H,3H,5H)-pyrimidinetrione) and its salts
30. 1,3-Dimethylbarbituric acid (1,3-dimethyl-2,4,6(1H,3H,5H)-pyrimidinetrione) and its salts
- Thiobarbiturates, their salts and derivatives including:
1. Thialbarbital (5-allyl-5-(2-cyclohexen-1-yl)-2-thiobarbituric acid)
2. Thiamylal (5-allyl-5-(1-methylbutyl)-2-thiobarbituric acid)
3. Thiobarbituric acid (2-thiobarbituric acid)
4. Thiopental (5-ethyl-5-(1-methylbutyl)-2-thiobarbituric acid)
- Chlorphentermine (1-(p-chlorophenyl)-2-methyl-2-aminopropane) and any salt thereof
- Diethylpropion (2-(diethylamino)propiophenone) and any salt thereof
- Phendimetrazine (d-3,4-dimethyl-2-phenylmorpholine) and any salt thereof
- Phenmetrazine (3-methyl-2-phenylmorpholine) and any salt thereof
- Pipradrol (α,α-diphenyl-2-piperidinemethanol) and any salt thereof
- Phentermine (α,α-dimethylbenzeneethanamine) and any salt thereof
- Butorphanol (l-N-cyclobutylmethyl-3,14-dihydroxymorphinan) and any salt thereof
- Nalbuphine (N-cyclobutylmethyl-4,5-epoxy-morphinan-3,6,14-triol) and any salt thereof
- Glutethimide (2-ethyl-2-phenylglutarimide)
- Clotiazepam (5-(o-chlorophenyl)-7-ethyl-1,3-dihydro-1-methyl-2H-thieno[2,3-e]-1,4-diazepin-2-one) and any salt thereof
- Ethchlorvynol (ethyl-2-chlorovinyl ethynyl carbinol)
- Ethinamate (1-ethynylcyclohexanol carbamate)
- Mazindol (5-(p-chlorophenyl)-2,5-dihydro-3H-imidazo[2,1-a]isoindol-5-ol)
- Meprobamate (2-methyl-2-propyl-1,3-propanediol dicarbamate)
- Methyprylon (3,3-diethyl-5-methyl-2,4-piperidinedione)
- Benzodiazepines, their salts and derivatives, including:
1. Alprazolam (8-chloro-1-methyl-6-phenyl-4H-s-triazolo[4,3-a][1,4] benzodiazepine)
2. Bromazepam (7-bromo-1,3-dihydro-5-(2-pyridyl)-2H-1, 4-benzodiazepin-2-one)
3. Brotizolam (2-bromo-4-(o-chlorophenyl)-9-methyl-6H-thieno[3,2-f]-s-triazolo[4,3-a][1,4]diazepine)
4. Camazepam (7-chloro-1,3-dihydro-3-(N,N- dimethylcarbamoyl)-1-methyl-5-phenyl-2H-1, 4-benzodiazepin-2-one)
5. Chlordiazepoxide (7-chloro-2-(methylamino)-5-phenyl-3H-1,4-benzodiazepine-4-oxide)
6. Clobazam (7-chloro-1-methyl-5-phenyl-1H-1,5-benzodiazepine-2,4(3H,5H)-dione)
7. Clonazepam (5-(o-chlorophenyl)-1,3-dihydro-7-nitro-2H-1,4-benzodiazepin-2-one)
8. Clorazepate (7-chloro-2,3-dihydro-2,2-dihydroxy-5-phenyl-1H-1,4-benzodiazepine-3-carboxylic acid)
9. Cloxazolam (10-chloro-11b-(o-chlorophenyl)-2,3, 7,11b-tetrahydrooxazolo[3,2-d][1,4]benzodiazepin 6-(5H)-one)
10. Delorazepam (7-chloro-5-(o-chlorophenyl)-1,3-dihydro-2H-1,4-benzodiazepin-2-one)
11. Diazepam (7-chloro-1,3-dihydro-1-methyl-5-phenyl-2H-1,4-benzodiazepin-2-one)
12. Estazolam (8-chloro-6-phenyl-4H-s-triazolo [4,3-a][1,4]benzodiazepine)
13. Ethyl Loflazepate (ethyl 7-chloro-5-(o-fluorophenyl)-2,3-dihydro-2-oxo-1H-1,4-benzodiazepine-3-carboxylate)
14. Fludiazepam (7-chloro-5-(o-fluorophenyl)-1,3-dihydro-1-methyl-2H-1,4-benzodiazepin-2-one)
15. [Repealed, SOR/98-173, s. 2]
16. Flurazepam (7-chloro-1-[2-(diethylamino) ethyl]-5-(o-fluorophenyl)-1,3-dihydro-2H-1,4-benzodiazepin-2-one)
17. Halazepam (7-chloro-1,3-dihydro-5-phenyl-1-(2,2,2-trifluoroethyl)-2H-1,4-benzodiazepin-2-one)
18. Haloxazolam (10-bromo-11b-(o-fluorophenyl)-2,3,7,11b-tetrahydrooxazolo[3,2-d][1,4]benzodiazepin-6(5H)-one)
19. Ketazolam (11-chloro-8,12b-dihydro-2,8-dimethyl-12b-phenyl-4H-[1,3]-oxazino-[3,2-d][1,4] benzodiazepine-4,7(6H)-dione)
20. Loprazolam (6-(o-chlorophenyl)-2,4-dihydro-2-[(4-methyl-1-piperazinyl)methylene]-8-nitro-1H-imidazo[1,2-a][1,4]benzodiazepin-1-one)
21. Lorazepam (7-chloro-5-(o-chlorophenyl)-1,3-dihydro-3-hydroxy-2H-1,4-benzodiazepin-2-one)
22. Lormetazepam (7-chloro-5-(o-chlorophenyl)-1,3-dihydro-3-hydroxy-1-methyl-2H-1,4-benzodiazepin-2-one)
23. Medazepam (7-chloro-2,3-dihydro-1-methyl-5-phenyl-1H-1,4-benzodiazepine)
  1. Midazolam (8-chloro-6-(o-fluorophenyl)-1-methyl-4H-imidazo[1,5-a][1,4]benzodiazepine)
24. Nimetazepam (1,3-dihydro-1-methyl-7-nitro-5-phenyl-2H-1,4-benzodiazepin-2-one)
25. Nitrazepam (1,3-dihydro-7-nitro-5-phenyl-2H-1,4-benzodiazepin-2-one)
26. Nordazepam (7-chloro-1,3-dihydro-5-phenyl-2H-1,4-benzodiazepin-2-one)
27. Oxazepam (7-chloro-1,3-dihydro-3-hydroxy-5-phenyl-2H-1,4-benzodiazepin-2-one)
28. Oxazolam (10-chloro-2,3,7,11b-tetrahydro-2-methyl-11b-phenyloxazolo[3,2-d] [1,4]benzodiazepin-6(5H)-one)
29. Pinazepam (7-chloro-1,3-dihydro-5-phenyl-1-(2-propynyl)-2H-1,4-benzodiazepin-2-one)
30. Prazepam (7-chloro-1-(cyclopropylmethyl)-1, 3-dihydro-5-phenyl-2H-1,4-benzodiazepin-2-one)
  1. Quazepam (7-chloro-5-(o-fluorophenyl)-1,3-dihydro-1-(2,2,2-trifluoroethyl)-2H-1,4-benzodiazepine-2-thione)
31. Temazepam (7-chloro-1,3-dihydro-3-hydroxy-1-methyl-5-phenyl-2H-1,4-benzodiazepin-2-one)
32. Tetrazepam (7-chloro-5-(cyclohexen-1-yl)-1,3-dihydro-1-methyl-2H-1,4-benzodiazepin-2-one)
33. Triazolam (8-chloro-6-(o-chlorophenyl)-1-methyl-4H-s-triazolo[4,3-a][1,4]benzodiazepine)
  but not including:
34. Clozapine (8-chloro-11-(4-methyl-1-piperazinyl)-5H-dibenzo[b,e][1,4]diazepine) and any salt thereof
35. Flunitrazepam (5-(o-fluorophenyl)-1,3-dihydro-1-methyl-7-nitro-2H-1,4-benzodiazepin-2-one) and any salts or derivatives thereof
36. Olanzapine (2-methyl-4-(4-methyl-1-piperazinyl)-10H-thieno[2,3-b][1,5]benzodiazepine) and its salts
37. Clozapine N-oxide (8-chloro-11-(4-methyl-4-oxido-1-piperazinyl)-5H-dibenzo[b,e][1,4]diazepine) and its salts
- Catha edulis Forsk., its preparations, derivatives, alkaloids and salts, including:
1. Cathine (d-threo-2-amino-1-hydroxy-1-phenylpropane)
- Fencamfamin (d,l-N-ethyl-3-phenylbicyclo[2,2,1] heptan-2-amine) and any salt thereof
- Fenproporex (d,l-3-[(α-methylphenethyl)amino]propionitrile) and any salt thereof
- Mefenorex (d,l-N-(3-chloropropyl)-α-methylbenzeneethanamine) and any salt thereof
- Anabolic steroids and their derivatives including:
1. Androisoxazole (17ß-hydroxy-17α-methylandrostano [3,2-c]isoxazole)
2. Androstanolone (17ß-hydroxy-5α-androstan-3-one)
3. Androstenediol (androst-5-ene-3ß,17ß-diol)
4. Bolandiol (estr-4-ene-3ß,17ß-diol)
5. Bolasterone (17ß-hydroxy-7α,17-dimethylandrost-4-en-3-one)
6. Bolazine (17ß-hydroxy-2α-methyl-5α-androstan-3-one azine)
7. Boldenone (17ß-hydroxyandrosta-1,4-dien-3-one)
8. Bolenol (19-nor-17α-pregn-5-en-17-ol)
9. Calusterone (17ß-hydroxy-7ß,17-dimethylandrost-4-en-3-one)
10. Clostebol (4-chloro-17ß-hydroxyandrost-4-en-3-one)
11. Drostanolone (17ß-hydroxy-2α-methyl-5α-androstan-3-one)
12. Enestebol (4, 17ß-dihydroxy-17-methylandrosta-1,4-dien-3-one)
13. Epitiostanol (2α, 3α-epithio-5α-androstan-17ß-ol)
14. Ethylestrenol (19-nor-17α-pregn-4-en-17-ol)
15. 4-Hydroxy-19-nor testosterone (4-HO-Nandrolone)
16. Fluoxymesterone (9-fluoro-11ß,17ß-dihydroxy-17-methylandrost-4-en-3-one)
17. Formebolone (11α, 17ß-dihydroxy-17-methyl-3-oxoandrosta-1,4 di-en-2-carboxaldehyde)
18. Furazabol (17-methyl-5α-androstano[2,3-c] furazan-17ß-ol)
19. Mebolazine (17ß-hydroxy-2α,17-dimethyl-5α-androstan-3-one azine)
20. Mesabolone (17ß-[(1-methoxycyclohexyl)oxy]-5α-androst-1-en-3-one)
21. Mesterolone (17ß-hydroxy-1α-methyl-5α-androstan-3-one)
22. Metandienone (17ß-hydroxy-17-methylandrosta-1,4-dien-3-one)
23. Metenolone (17ß-hydroxy-1-methyl-5α-androst-1-en-3-one)
24. Methandriol (17α-methylandrost-5-ene-3ß,17ß-diol)
25. Methyltestosterone (17ß-hydroxy-17-methylandrost-4-en-3-one)
26. Metribolone (17ß-hydroxy-17-methylestra-4, 9,11-trien-3-one)
27. Mibolerone (17ß-hydroxy-7α,17-dimethylestr-4-en-3-one)
28. Nandrolone (17ß-hydroxyestr-4-en-3-one)
29. Norboletone (13-ethyl-17ß-hydroxy-18, 19-dinorpregn-4-en-3-one)
30. Norclostebol (4-chloro-17ß-hydroxyestr-4-en-3-one)
31. Norethandrolone (17α-ethyl-17ß-hydroxyestr-4-en-3-one)
32. Oxabolone (4,17ß-dihydroxyestr-4-en-3-one)
33. Oxandrolone (17ß-hydroxy-17-methyl-2-oxa-5α-androstan-3-one)
34. Oxymesterone (4,17ß-dihydroxy-17-methylandrost-4-en-3-one)
35. Oxymetholone (17ß-hydroxy-2-(hydroxymethylene)-17-methyl-5α-androstan-3-one)
36. Prasterone (3ß-hydroxyandrost-5-en-17-one)
37. Quinbolone (17ß-(1-cyclopenten-1-yloxy) androsta-1,4-dien-3-one)
38. Stanozolol (17ß-hydroxy-17-methyl-5α-androstano [3,2-c]pyrazole)
39. Stenbolone (17ß-hydroxy-2-methyl-5α-androst-1-en-3-one)
40. Testosterone (17ß-hydroxyandrost-4-en-3-one)
41. Tibolone ((7α,17α)-17-hydroxy-7-methyl-19-norpregn-5(10) en-20-yn-3-one)
42. Tiomesterone (1α,7α-bis(acetylthio)-17ß -hydroxy-17-methylandrost-4-en-3-one)
43. Trenbolone (17ß-hydroxyestra-4,9,11-trien-3-one)
- Zeranol (3,4,5,6,7,8,9,10,11,12-decahydro-7,14,16-trihydroxy-3-methyl-1H-2-benzoxacyclotetradecin-1-one)
- Zolpidem (N,N,6-trimethyl-2-(4-methylphenyl)imidazo[1,2-a]pyridine-3-acetamide) and any salt thereof
- Pemoline (2-amino-5-phenyl-oxazolin-4-one) and any salt thereof
- Pyrovalerone (4′-methyl-2-(1-pyrrolidinyl)valerophenone) and any salt thereof
- Salvia divinorum (S. divinorum), its preparations and derivatives, including:
1. Salvinorin A ((2S,4aR,6aR,7R,9S,10aS,10bR)-9-(acetyloxy)-2-(3-furanyl)dodecahydro-6a,10b-dimethyl-4,10-dioxo-2H-naphtho[2,1-c]pyran-7-carboxylic acid methyl ester)

=== Schedule V ===
- Spirobrorphine (8-[1-(4-bromophenyl)ethyl]-1-phenyl-1,3,8-triazaspiro[4.5]decan-4-one) and its salts (from the period beginning June 5, 2026 and ending June 4, 2027)
- Spirochlorphine (8-[1-(4-chlorophenyl)ethyl]-1-phenyl-1,3,8-triazaspiro[4.5]decan-4-one) and its salts (from the period beginning June 5, 2026 and ending June 4, 2027)

=== Schedule VI (Precursors) ===
==== PART 1 ====
Class A Precursors (Note: Each Class A precursor includes synthetic and natural forms.)

- Acetic anhydride
- N-Acetylanthranilic acid (2-acetamidobenzoic acid) and its salts
- Anthranilic acid (2-aminobenzoic acid) and its salts
- Ephedrine (erythro-2-(methylamino)-1-phenylpropan-1-ol), its salts and any plant containing ephedrine or any of its salts
- Ergometrine (9,10-didehydro-N-(2-hydroxy-1-methylethyl)-6-methylergoline-8-carboxamide) and its salts
- Ergotamine (12′-hydroxy-2′-methyl-5′-(phenylmethyl)ergotaman-3′,6′,18-trione) and its salts
- Isosafrole (5-(1-propenyl)-1,3-benzodioxole)
- Lysergic acid (9,10-didehydro-6-methylergoline-8-carboxylic acid) and its salts
- 3,4-Methylenedioxyphenyl-2-propanone (1-(1,3-benzodioxole)-2-propanone), its derivatives and analogues and salts of derivatives and analogues, including:
  1. methyl 3-(1,3 benzodioxol-5-yl)-2-methyloxirane-2-carboxylate (MMDMG)
- Norephedrine (Phenylpropanolamine) and its salts
- 1-Phenyl-2-propanone, its derivatives and analogues and salts of derivatives and analogues, including:
  1. methyl 2-methyl-3-phenyloxirane-2-carboxylate (BMK methyl glycidate)
  2. 3-oxo-2-phenylbutanamide (α- phenylacetoacetamide-APAA)
- Phenylacetic acid and its salts
- Piperidine and its salts
- Piperonal (1,3-benzodioxole-5-carboxaldehyde)
- Potassium permanganate
- Pseudoephedrine (threo-2-(methylamino)-1-phenylpropan-1-ol), its salts and any plant containing pseudoephedrine or any of its salts
- Safrole (5-(2-propenyl)-1,3-benzodioxole) and any essential oil containing more than 4% safrole
- Gamma-butyrolactone (dihydro-2(3H)-furanone)
- 1,4-butanediol
- Red Phosphorus
- White Phosphorus
- Hypophosphorous acid, its salts and derivatives
- Hydriodic acid
- Alpha-phenylacetoacetonitrile and its salts, isomers and salts of isomers
- Propionyl chloride
- 1-Phenethyl-4-piperidone and its salts
- 4-Piperidone and its salts
- Norfentanyl (N-phenyl-N-piperidin-4-ylpropanamide), its salts, derivatives and analogues and salts of derivatives and analogues
- 1-Phenethylpiperidin-4-ylidenephenylamine and its salts
- N-Phenyl-4-piperidinamine (N-phenylpiperidin-4-amine), its salts, derivatives and analogues and salts of derivatives and analogues, including:
  1. 4-anilino-1-boc-piperidine (tert-butyl 4-(phenylamino)piperidine-1-carboxylate)
  2. 4-fluoro anilino-1-boc-piperidine (tert-butyl 4-((4-fluorophenyl)amino)piperidine-1-carboxylate)
  3. N-(4-fluorophenyl)-4-piperidinamine (N-(4-fluorophenyl)piperidin-4-amine)
  4. 4-bromo anilino-1-boc-piperidine (tert-butyl 4-((4-bromophenyl)amino)piperidine-1-carboxylate)
- N^{1},N^{1},N^{2}-trimethylcyclohexane-1,2-diamine and its salts
- Benzylfentanyl (N-(1-benzylpiperidin-4-yl)-N-phenylpropionamide), its salts, derivatives and analogues and salts of derivatives and analogues

==== PART 2 ====
Class B Precursors (Note: Each Class B precursor includes synthetic forms.)

- Acetone
- Diethyl ether
- Hydrochloric acid
- Methyl ethyl ketone
- Sulfuric acid
- Toluene

==== PART 3 ====
Preparations and Mixtures

- Any preparation or mixture that contains a precursor set out in Part 1, except items 20 to 23 [Red Phosphorus; White Phosphorus; Hypophosphorous acid, its salts and derivatives; Hydriodic acid], or in Part 2.

=== Schedule VII ===
[Repealed, 2018, c. 16, s. 205] Previously prohibited the possession of cannabis and cannabis resin in amounts greater than 3 kg.

=== Schedule VIII ===
[Repealed, 2018, c. 16, s. 205] Previously prohibited the possession of cannabis and cannabis resin in amounts greater than 30 grams and 1 gram, respectively.

=== Schedule IX ===
1. Manual, semi-automatic or fully automatic device that may be used to compact or mould powdered, granular or semi-solid material to produce coherent solid tablets
2. Manual, semi-automatic or fully automatic device that may be used to fill capsules with any powdered, granular, semi-solid or liquid material

== Laws – Penalties ==
=== Possession ===
If tried as an indictable offence, the defendant is liable to:

Schedule I: Maximum 3 years' imprisonment
Schedule II: Maximum 2 years' imprisonment
Schedule III: Maximum 1 years' imprisonment
Schedule IV: It is not an indictable offence to possess a Schedule IV substance for personal use.

If tried as a summary conviction offence, the defendant is liable to:

Schedule I, II, or III: Maximum $1000 fine for the first offence and/or a maximum 6-month term of imprisonment, increasing to a maximum fine of $2000 for each subsequent offense and/or a maximum of 1 year in prison.
Schedule IV: It is not a summary offence to possess a Schedule IV substance for personal use.

Section (4), Subsection (2) of the CDSA reads that any person who obtains or who makes any attempt to obtain a Schedule I through IV substance from a physician without fully disclosing the details of any previous instances of obtaining a Schedule I through IV substance in the preceding thirty (30) days, a practice often referred to as "doctor shopping", is guilty of a summary or indictable offense, as per Section (4), Subsection (7)(a) and (b).

These drugs are considered lawful (and thus without penalty) if the person from whom the substance, precursor or property was seized came into possession of it lawfully and continued to deal with it lawfully, such as through a prescription by a prescribing practitioner.

=== Trafficking/Possession for the Purpose of Distribution ===
If tried as an indictable offence, the defendant is liable to:

Schedule I or Schedule II: Maximum 4 years' imprisonment

- Mandatory minimum 1 year's imprisonment for exporting a Schedule I drug under 1 kg (2 lb), 2 years if amount exceeds 1 kg (2 lb)

Schedule III or Schedule IV: Maximum 4 years' imprisonment
Schedule V or Schedule VI: Maximum 2 years' imprisonment

Or, if tried as a summary conviction, the defendant is liable to:

Schedule III or Schedule IV: Maximum 9 months' imprisonment
Schedule V or Schedule VI: Maximum 6 months' imprisonment

=== Production ===
If tried as an indictable offence, the defendant is liable to:

Schedule I or Schedule II: Maximum 4 years imprisonment

- minimum 2 years' imprisonment

Schedule III: Maximum 4 years' imprisonment
Schedule IV: Maximum 2 years' imprisonment

Or, if tried as a summary conviction, the defendant is liable to:

Schedule III: Maximum 9 months' imprisonment
Schedule IV: Maximum 6 months' imprisonment

== See also ==
- Controlled Substances Act (US)
- Misuse of Drugs Act 1971 (UK)
- Legal status of psychedelic drugs in Canada
