= Aprobarbital =

Chemical compound

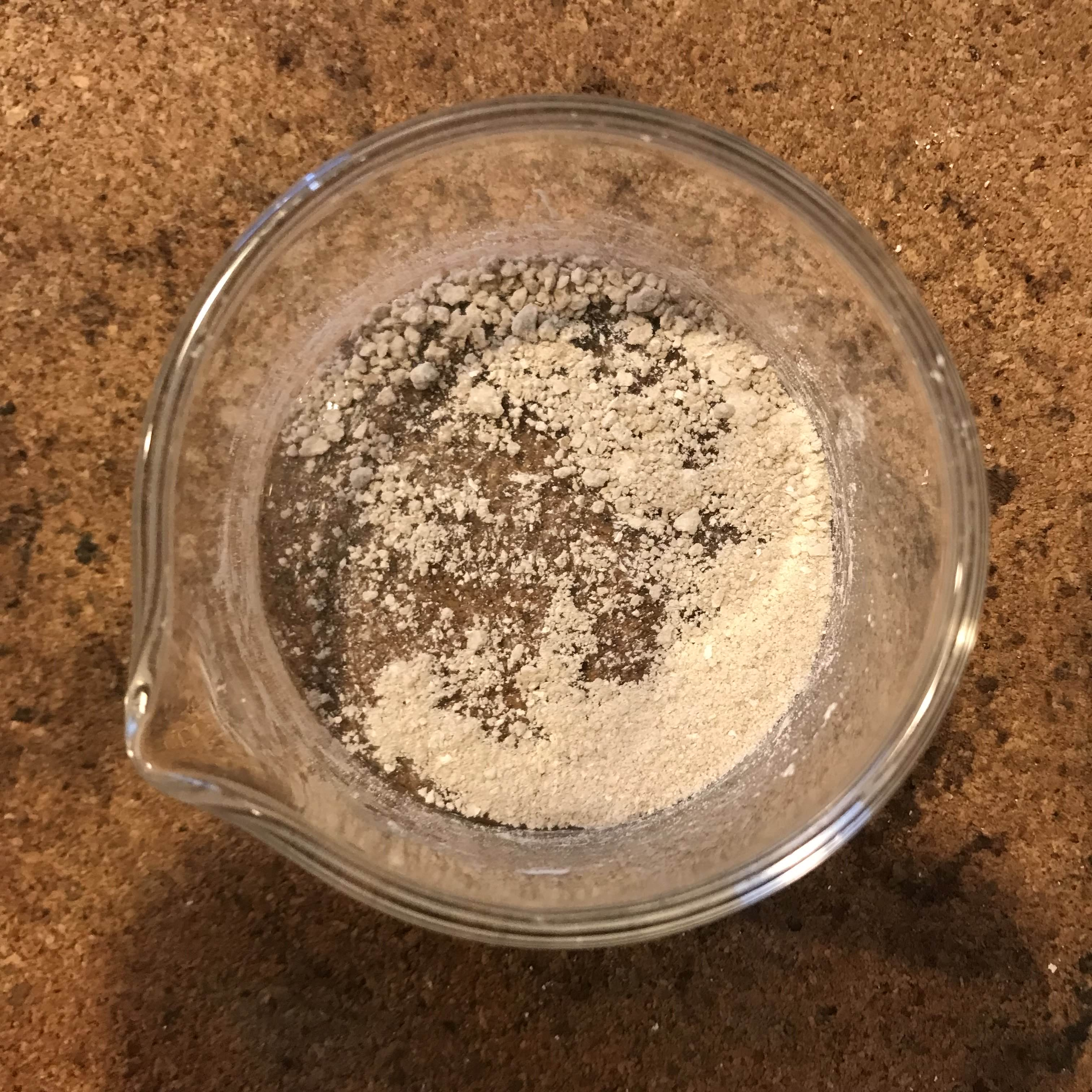

Clinical data
- Trade names: Oramon, Somnifane, Allonal
- Other names: aprobarbitone, allylpropymal, Alurate, 5-isopropyl- 5-allylbarbituric acid
- AHFS/Drugs.com: International Drug Names
- Drug class: Barbiturate
- ATC code: N05CA05 (WHO)

Legal status
- Legal status: BR: Class B1 (Psychoactive drugs); CA: Schedule IV

Identifiers
- IUPAC name: 5-propan-2-yl-5-prop-2-enyl-1,3-diazinane-2,4,6-trione
- CAS Number: 77-02-1
- PubChem CID: 6464
- DrugBank: DB01352
- ChemSpider: 6221
- UNII: Q0YKG9L6RF
- KEGG: D00698
- ChEBI: CHEBI:2791
- ChEMBL: ChEMBL7863
- CompTox Dashboard (EPA): DTXSID8022616
- ECHA InfoCard: 100.000.908

Chemical and physical data
- Formula: C_{10}H_{14}N_{2}O_{3}
- Molar mass: 210.233 g·mol^{−1}
- 3D model (JSmol): Interactive image
- SMILES: O=C1NC(=O)NC(=O)C1(C(C)C)C\C=C
- InChI: InChI=1S/C10H14N2O3/c1-4-5-10(6(2)3)7(13)11-9(15)12-8(10)14/h4,6H,1,5H2,2-3H3,(H2,11,12,13,14,15); Key:UORJNBVJVRLXMQ-UHFFFAOYSA-N

Aprobarbital or aprobarbitone (International Naming Nomenclature) is a barbiturate (chemical derivative of barbituric acid) distributed by trade names Oramon, Somnafon, and Allonal. It was developed from in the 1920s by Ernst Preiswerk, and possesses sedative, hypnotic, and anticonvulsant properties, being used primarily for the treatment of insomnia.

Aprobarbital was the structure from which enallylpropymal synthesized, being was methylated in the 1934. It was never as widely usemore common barbiturate such as phenobarbital and is now rarely prescribed.

== See also ==
- Alphenal
