= PCAA =

PCAA may refer to:

- 5-((1-Phenylcyclohexyl)amino)pentanoic acid
- Big West Conference, an American college athletics conference originally named the Pacific Coast Athletic Association
- Pakistan Civil Aviation Authority, an organization that regulates civil aviation in Pakistan
- Progressive Conservative Association of Alberta, a political party in Alberta, Canada
