= Thialbarbital =

Chemical compound

Clinical data
- Other names: Kemithal, 5-(1-cyclohex-2-enyl)-5-prop-2-enyl-2-sulfanylidene-1,3-diazinane-4,6-dione
- ATC code: none

Legal status
- Legal status: CA: Schedule IV

Identifiers
- IUPAC name: 5-allyl-5-cyclohex-2-en-1-yl-2-thioxodihydropyrimidine-4,6(1H,5H)-dione
- CAS Number: 467-36-7; as salt: 3546-29-0
- PubChem CID: 3032306
- ChemSpider: 2297316
- UNII: ENV72C33QD; as salt: RHK739S84F
- ChEMBL: ChEMBL2104657
- CompTox Dashboard (EPA): DTXSID90861960
- ECHA InfoCard: 100.006.720

Chemical and physical data
- Formula: C_{13}H_{16}N_{2}O_{2}S
- Molar mass: 264.34 g·mol^{−1}
- 3D model (JSmol): Interactive image
- SMILES: O=C1NC(=S)NC(=O)C1(C2/C=C\CCC2)C\C=C
- InChI: InChI=1S/C13H16N2O2S/c1-2-8-13(9-6-4-3-5-7-9)10(16)14-12(18)15-11(13)17/h2,4,6,9H,1,3,5,7-8H2,(H2,14,15,16,17,18); Key:PXLVRFQEBVNJOH-UHFFFAOYSA-N

Thialbarbital (Intranarcon) is a barbiturate derivative invented in the 1960s. It has sedative effects, and was used primarily for induction in surgical anaesthesia. Thialbarbital is short acting and has less of a tendency to induce respiratory depression than other barbiturate derivatives such as pentobarbital.

== See also ==
- Thiamylal
