= Metheptazine =

Phenazepine opioid analgesic

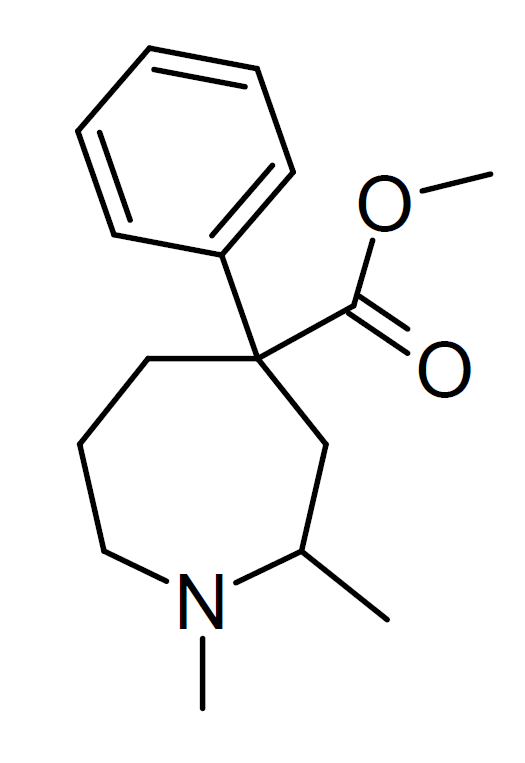

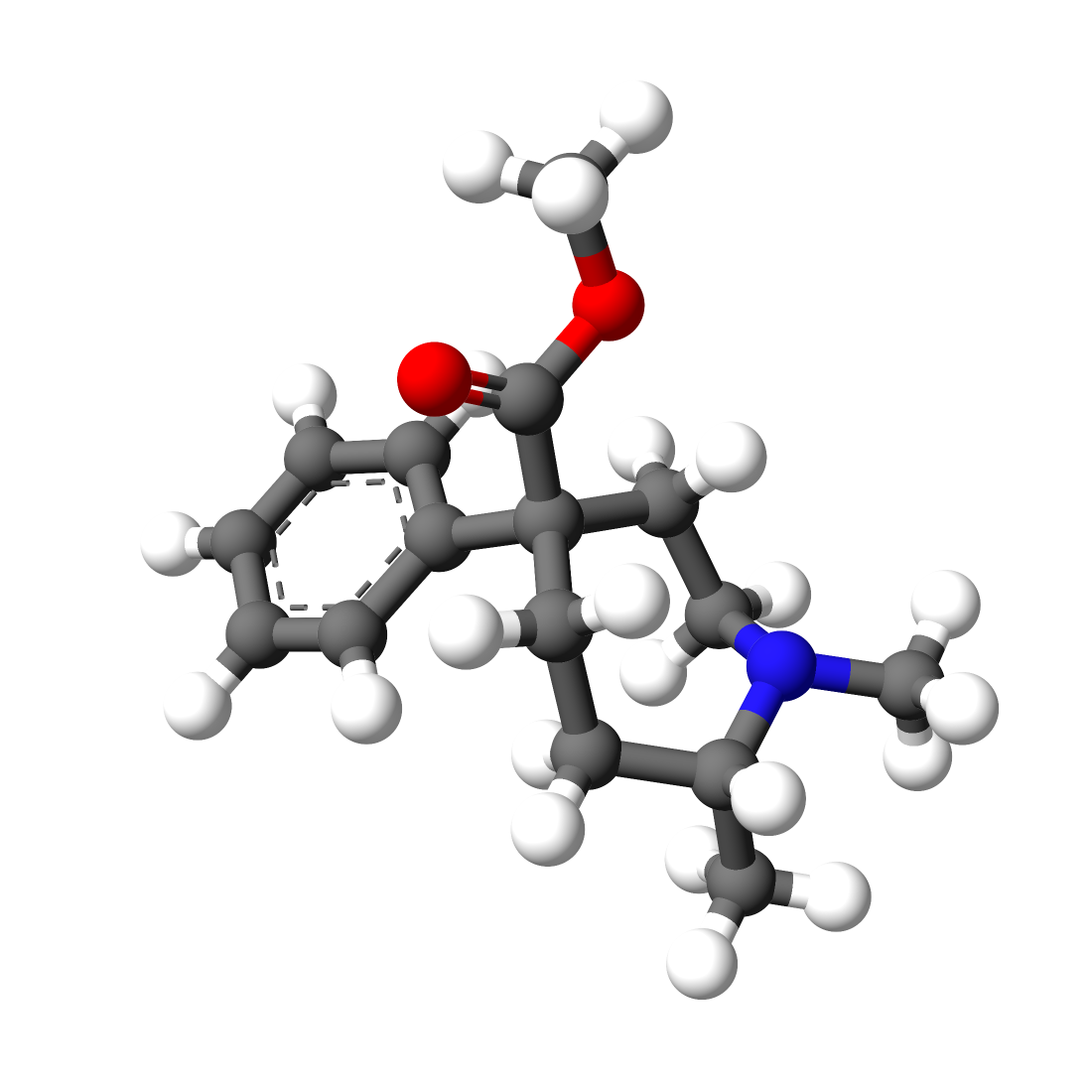

Clinical data
- Other names: Metheptazine
- ATC code: none

Identifiers
- IUPAC name: methyl 1,2-dimethyl-4-phenylazepane-4-carboxylate
- CAS Number: 469-78-3
- PubChem CID: 3047717
- ChemSpider: 2310051
- UNII: 93X4R66P5A
- ChEMBL: ChEMBL2104520
- CompTox Dashboard (EPA): DTXSID10861967

Chemical and physical data
- Formula: C_{16}H_{23}NO_{2}
- Molar mass: 261.365 g·mol^{−1}
- 3D model (JSmol): Interactive image
- SMILES: O=C(OC)C2(c1ccccc1)CC(N(C)CCC2)C
- InChI: InChI=1S/C16H23NO2/c1-13-12-16(15(18)19-3,10-7-11-17(13)2)14-8-5-4-6-9-14/h4-6,8-9,13H,7,10-12H2,1-3H3; Key:RAAFYFKWMRWOIT-UHFFFAOYSA-N

Metheptazine is an opioid analgesic from the phenazepane family. It was developed by American Home Products in the 1950s.

Metheptazine produces similar effects to other opioids, including analgesia, sedation, dizziness and nausea.

Metheptazine is not listed as a controlled substance under the Controlled Substances Act 1970 in the United States. The Canadian Controlled Drugs and Substances Act specifically excludes the phenazepine opioids metheptazine, ethoheptazine, and metethoheptazine from control.
