= C12H17N =

The molecular formula C_{12}H_{17}N (molar mass: 175.27 g/mol) may refer to:

- 2-Benzylpiperidine
- 4-Benzylpiperidine
- Indanylaminopropane
- 2-Methyl-3-phenylpiperidine
- 4-Phenylazepane
- Phenylethylpyrrolidine
- UCD0830
