= C11H15BrN2O3 =

The molecular formula C_{11}H_{15}BrN_{2}O_{3} (molar mass: 303.15 g/mol, exact mass: 302.0266 u) may refer to:

- Butallylonal
- Narcobarbital
