= C9H14N2O3 =

The molecular formula C_{9}H_{14}N_{2}O_{3} (molar mass: 198.219 g/mol, exact mass: 198.1004 u) may refer to:

- Metharbital
- Probarbital
