= Zactane =

Zactane is the trade name of two different drugs:

- Famotidine, a histamine H_{2}-receptor antagonist that inhibits stomach acid production
- Ethoheptazine, an opioid analgesic
