= Ortal =

Ortal may refer to:

- Hexethal, a sedative-hypnotic barbiturate drug previously marketed by Parke-Davis as Ortal
- Marie Ortal Malka, Israeli singer commonly known as Ortal
- Jeronimo Ortal de Saragosa, colonial governor of Paria and Maracapana, eastern portion of Venezuela, Oct. 1534-1541(?)
- Ortal, Golan Heights, an Israeli settlement and a kibbutz in the Golan Heights
