= Aspirin/meprobamate =

Combination drug

Combination of
- Aspirin: NSAID
- Meprobamate: Anxiolytic

Clinical data
- Trade names: Equagesic
- AHFS/Drugs.com: Micromedex Detailed Consumer Information
- Routes of administration: Oral
- ATC code: N05BC51 (WHO)

Legal status
- Legal status: US: ℞-only

Identifiers
- CAS Number: 8056-21-1

Aspirin/meprobamate, sold under the brand name Equagesic (/ˌɛkwəˈdʒiːzɪk/), is a combination drug of aspirin and meprobamate indicated for short-term pain treatment accompanied by tension or anxiety in patients with musculoskeletal disorders or tension headache. Some formulations also contain ethoheptazine, an opioid analgesic.

== Other combinations ==
There also appears to be a combination with ethoheptazine, an opioid analgesic.

== Society and culture ==
Equagesic was discontinued in the United States, because of its possible toxic effects, specifically of meprobamate. It was credited with the sudden death of actor Bruce Lee in 1973. Lee suffered a fatal hypersensitive reaction to one of the prescription drug's ingredients while working in Hong Kong.
