= Quinbolone =

Chemical compound

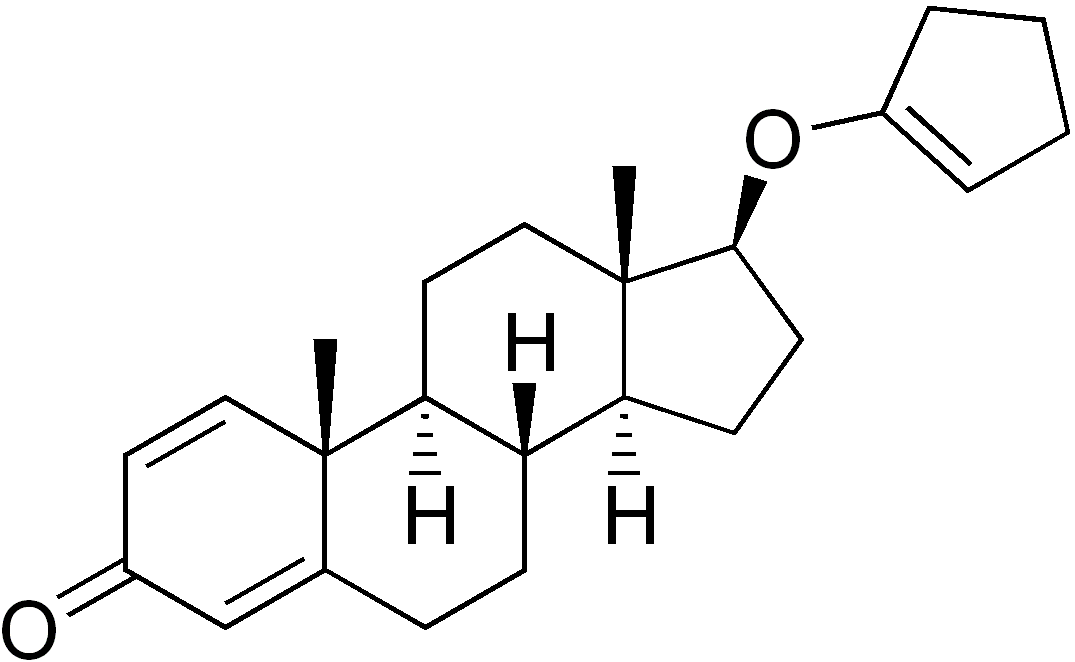

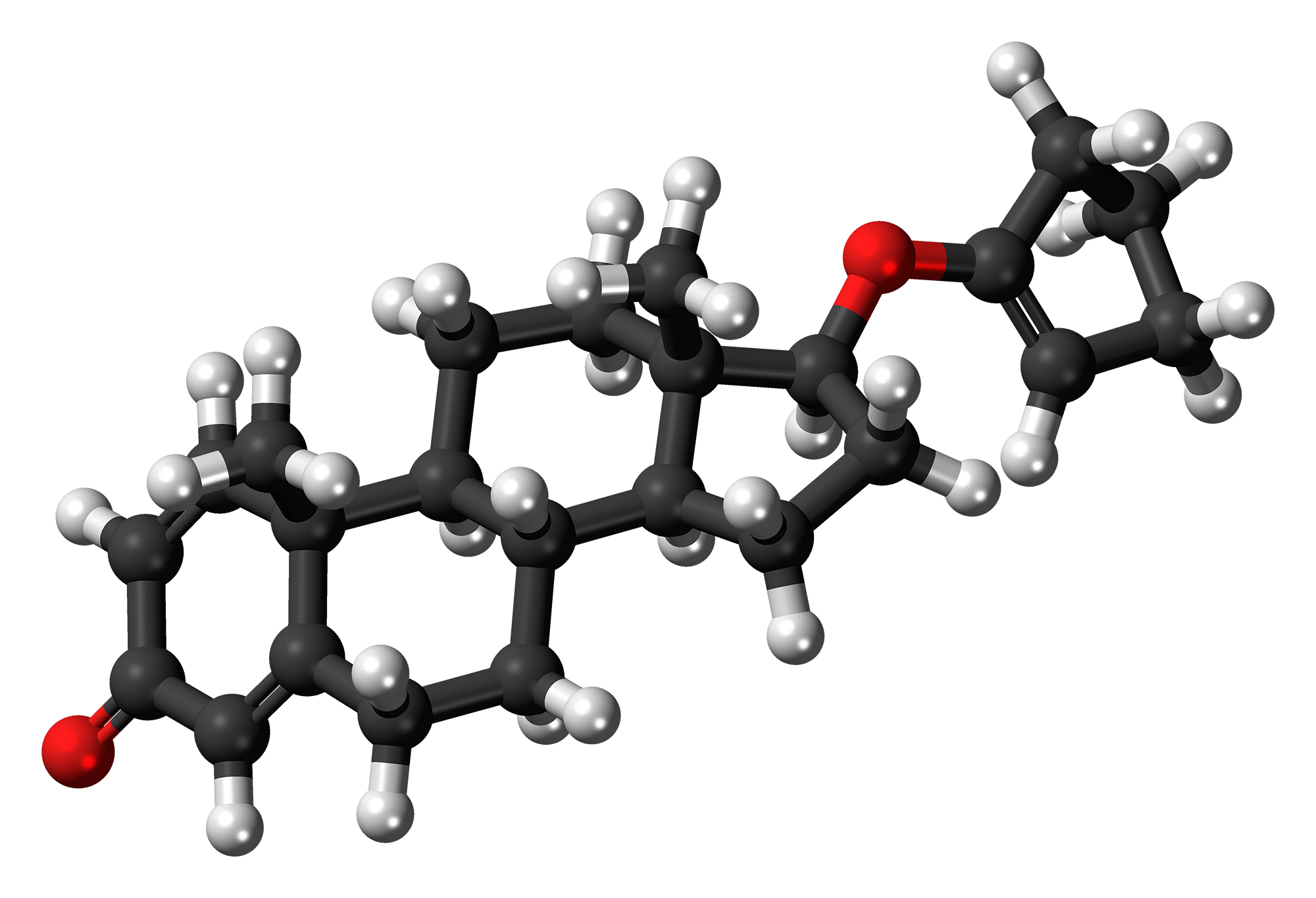

Clinical data
- Trade names: Anabolicum, Anabolvis
- Other names: MK-810; Δ^{1}-Testosterone 17β-cyclopent-1-enyl enol ether; 1-Dehydrotestosterone 17β-cyclopent-1-enyl ether; 17β-(1-Cyclopenten-1-yloxy)androsta-1,4-dien-3-one; Androsta-1,4-dien-17β-ol-3-one 17β-(1-cyclopent-1-ene)
- Pregnancy category: X
- Routes of administration: By mouth
- ATC code: A14AA06 (WHO)

Legal status
- Legal status: CA: Schedule IV; US: Schedule III

Pharmacokinetic data
- Metabolism: Liver
- Excretion: Urine

Identifiers
- IUPAC name: (8R,9S,10R,13S,14S,17S)-17-(1-Cyclopentenyloxy)-10,13-dimethyl- 6,7,8,9,11,12,14,15,16,17-decahydrocyclopenta[a]phenanthren-3-one
- CAS Number: 2487-63-0
- PubChem CID: 10360683
- ChemSpider: 8536132
- UNII: W59598KWLX
- KEGG: D05674
- CompTox Dashboard (EPA): DTXSID20179580

Chemical and physical data
- Formula: C_{24}H_{32}O_{2}
- Molar mass: 352.518 g·mol^{−1}
- 3D model (JSmol): Interactive image
- SMILES: O=C\1\C=C/[C@]5(/C(=C/1)CC[C@@H]3[C@@H]5CC[C@@]4([C@@H](O/C2=C/CCC2)CC[C@@H]34)C)C
- InChI: InChI=1S/C24H32O2/c1-23-13-11-17(25)15-16(23)7-8-19-20-9-10-22(26-18-5-3-4-6-18)24(20,2)14-12-21(19)23/h5,11,13,15,19-22H,3-4,6-10,12,14H2,1-2H3/t19-,20-,21-,22-,23-,24-/m0/s1; Key:IUVKMZGDUIUOCP-BTNSXGMBSA-N

Quinbolone (INN, USAN), sold under the brand names Anabolicum and Anabolvis, is an androgen and anabolic steroid (AAS) which was previously marketed in Italy. It was developed by Parke-Davis as a viable orally administered AAS with little or no liver toxicity.

== Pharmacology ==
Most orally administered anabolic steroids function by having an alkylated 17α-carbon atom, which prevents first-pass metabolism by the liver. This approach however results in the AAS having hepatotoxicity. Quinbolone is not 17α-alkylated; instead it has increased oral bioavailability due to its cyclopentenyl ether group. After ingestion, the inactive quinbolone is transformed into boldenone.

Quinbolone itself has very few androgenic effects, and most of what it does have are a result of its conversion to boldenone and its metabolites. Because of high doses necessary for androgenic effects, cost and inconvenience meant that quinbolone never proved to be commercially successful, and its clinical applications were fulfilled by alternative, more effective, AAS. Its illicit usage in bodybuilding and athletics likewise proved limited, though drug tests are still used to detect its metabolites as it remains a banned substance for most competitive sports.

Quinbolone, via boldenone, can be transformed into estrogens, and hence may have some estrogenic activity.

== Chemistry ==
Quinbolone, also known as δ^{1}-testosterone 17β-cyclopent-1-enyl enol ether or as androsta-1,4-dien-17β-ol-3-one 17β-(1-cyclopent-1-ene) enol ether, is a synthetic androstane steroid and a derivative of testosterone. It is the C17β cyclopentyl enol ether of boldenone (δ^{1}-testosterone). A related AAS is boldenone undecylenate (δ^{1}-testosterone 17β-undec-10-enoate).

=== Synthesis ===
Quinbolone can be prepared from testosterone. Dehydrogenation using DDQ forms boldenone. Reaction with 1,1-dimethoxycyclopentane followed by heating to eliminate methanol gives quinbolone.

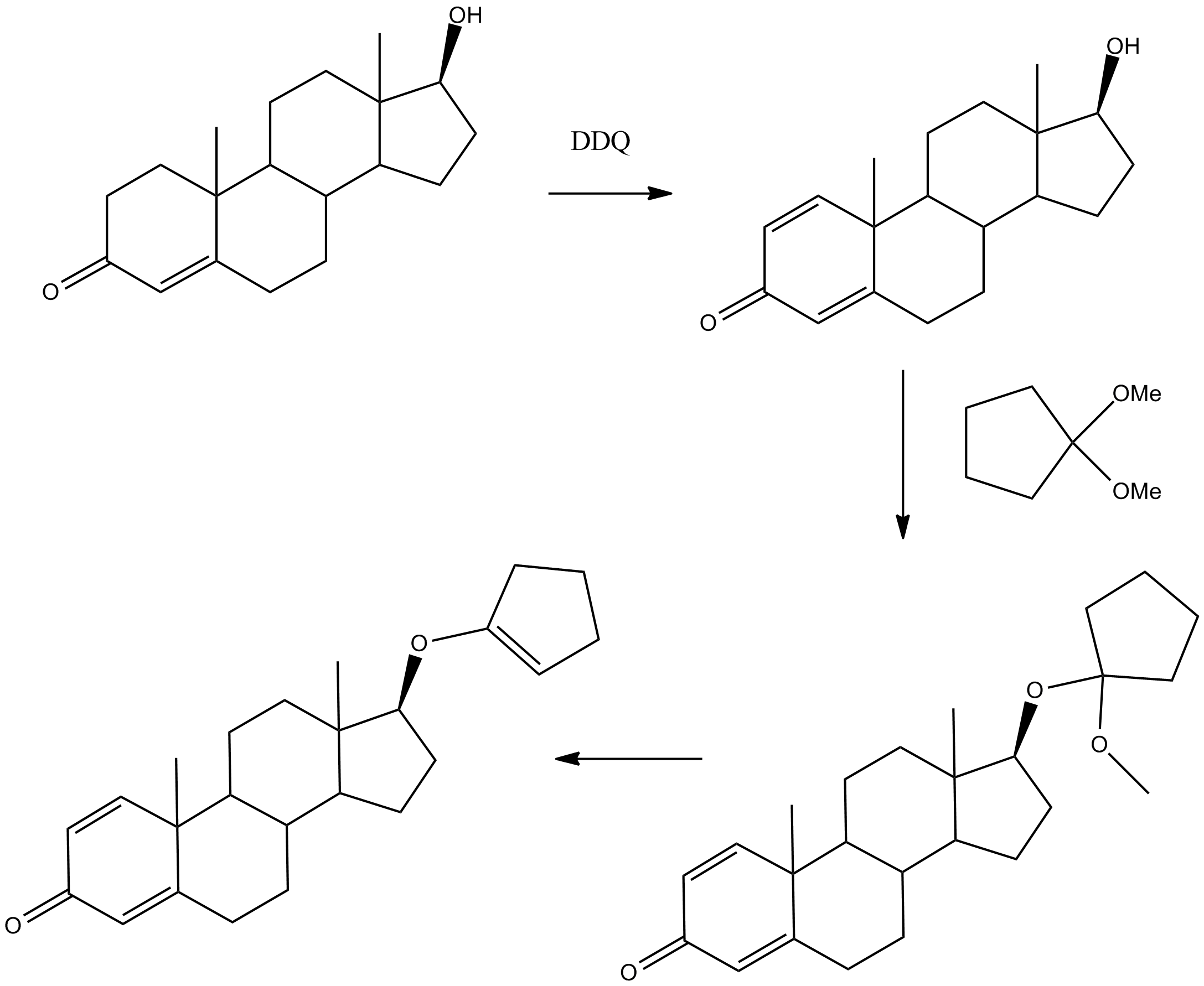
Quinbolone synthesis:

== History ==
Quinbolone was described as early as 1962. It was marketed in Italy by Parke-Davis.
