= Heptobarbital =

Chemical compound

Clinical data
- ATC code: None

Legal status
- Legal status: CA: Schedule IV

Identifiers
- IUPAC name: 5-methyl-5-phenylpyrimidine-2,4,6(1H,3H,5H)-trione
- CAS Number: 76-94-8
- PubChem CID: 66160
- ChemSpider: 59547
- UNII: GFR227X6YY
- CompTox Dashboard (EPA): DTXSID00226900
- ECHA InfoCard: 100.000.905

Chemical and physical data
- Formula: C_{11}H_{10}N_{2}O_{3}
- Molar mass: 218.212 g·mol^{−1}
- 3D model (JSmol): Interactive image
- SMILES: O=C1NC(=O)NC(=O)C1(c2ccccc2)C
- InChI: InChI=1S/C11H10N2O3/c1-11(7-5-3-2-4-6-7)8(14)12-10(16)13-9(11)15/h2-6H,1H3,(H2,12,13,14,15,16); Key:LSAOZCAKUIANSQ-UHFFFAOYSA-N

Heptobarbital (Rutonal), also known as phenylmethylbarbituric acid, is a barbiturate derivative. It has often been confused with methylphenobarbital because both drugs contain a methylphenyl moiety and are overall very similar in structure.

== See also ==
- Barbiturate
