= Sigmodal =

Chemical compound

Legal status
- Legal status: CA: Schedule IV

Identifiers
- IUPAC name: 5-(2-bromoprop-2-en-1-yl)-5-(1-methylbutyl)pyrimidine-2,4,6(1H,3H,5H)-trione
- CAS Number: 1216-40-6
- PubChem CID: 14630
- ChemSpider: 13964
- UNII: 8N609W64JZ
- CompTox Dashboard (EPA): DTXSID90874338
- ECHA InfoCard: 100.013.575

Chemical and physical data
- Formula: C_{12}H_{17}BrN_{2}O_{3}
- Molar mass: 317.183 g·mol^{−1}
- 3D model (JSmol): Interactive image
- SMILES: CCCC(C)C1(C(=O)NC(=O)NC1=O)CC(=C)Br
- InChI: InChI=1S/C12H17BrN2O3/c1-4-5-7(2)12(6-8(3)13)9(16)14-11(18)15-10(12)17/h7H,3-6H2,1-2H3,(H2,14,15,16,17,18); Key:ZGVCLZRQOUEZHG-UHFFFAOYSA-N

Sigmodal (Rectidon) is a barbiturate derivative. It has sedative, hypnotic and anticonvulsant properties, and was used in surgical anaesthesia in the 1950s, and frequently appeared in drug mixtures in the 60s.

It was never widely used compared to better known barbiturates such as thiopental, and has now been replaced by newer drugs with a better safety profile.
