= Hexethal =

Chemical compound

Clinical data
- Other names: Sodium 5-ethyl-5-hexylbarbiturate, Ortal, Hebaral
- ATC code: none

Legal status
- Legal status: CA: Schedule IV

Identifiers
- IUPAC name: sodium 5-ethyl-5-hexyl-4,6-dioxo-1H-pyrimidin-2-olate
- CAS Number: 144-00-3
- PubChem CID: 8941
- ChemSpider: 8597
- UNII: ATA79U054W
- CompTox Dashboard (EPA): DTXSID00162591

Chemical and physical data
- Formula: C_{12}H_{19}N_{2}NaO_{3}
- Molar mass: 262.285 g·mol^{−1}
- 3D model (JSmol): Interactive image
- SMILES: [Na+].O=C1/N=C(/[O-])NC(=O)C1(CCCCCC)CC
- InChI: InChI=1S/C12H20N2O3.Na/c1-3-5-6-7-8-12(4-2)9(15)13-11(17)14-10(12)16;/h3-8H2,1-2H3,(H2,13,14,15,16,17);/q;+1/p-1; Key:HXUAXLUDTCGASZ-UHFFFAOYSA-M

Hexethal (Ortal) is a barbiturate derivative invented in the 1940s. It has sedative, anxiolytic, muscle relaxant, and anticonvulsant properties, and was used primarily as an anaesthetic in veterinary medicine.

Hexethal is considered similar in effects to pentobarbital, with a very fast onset of action but short duration of effects.
