= Alphenal =

Chemical compound

Clinical data
- Trade names: Alphenal, Efrodal, Prophenal, Sanudorm
- Other names: 5-Phenyl-5-allylbarbituric acid
- Routes of administration: By mouth
- Drug class: Barbiturate
- ATC code: none

Legal status
- Legal status: CA: Schedule IV; US: Schedule III

Identifiers
- IUPAC name: 5-phenyl-5-prop-2-enyl-1,3-diazinane-2,4,6-trione
- CAS Number: 115-43-5
- PubChem CID: 8274
- ChemSpider: 7975
- UNII: 7T7L08Q9JI
- CompTox Dashboard (EPA): DTXSID60150919
- ECHA InfoCard: 100.003.718

Chemical and physical data
- Formula: C_{13}H_{12}N_{2}O_{3}
- Molar mass: 244.250 g·mol^{−1}
- 3D model (JSmol): Interactive image
- SMILES: O=C1NC(=O)NC(=O)C1(c2ccccc2)C\C=C
- InChI: InChI=1S/C13H12N2O3/c1-2-8-13(9-6-4-3-5-7-9)10(16)14-12(18)15-11(13)17/h2-7H,1,8H2,(H2,14,15,16,17,18); Key:WOIGZSBYKGQJGL-UHFFFAOYSA-N

Alphenal, also known as 5-allyl-5-phenylbarbituric acid, is a barbiturate derivative developed in the 1920s. It has primarily anticonvulsant properties and was used occasionally for the treatment of epilepsy or convulsions, although not as commonly as better known barbiturates such as phenobarbital.

LD_{50}: Mouse (Oral): 280 mg/kg
