= Oxygenation =

Oxygenation may refer to:

- Oxygenation (environmental), a measurement of dissolved oxygen concentration in soil or water
- Oxygen saturation (medicine), The percent of hemoglobin saturated by oxygen, usually in arterial blood.
- Water oxygenation, the process of increasing the oxygen saturation of the water
- Great Oxygenation Event, an ancient event that led to the rise of oxygen within our atmosphere

== See also ==
- Oxygenase, an enzyme that oxidizes a substrate by transferring the oxygen from molecular oxygen O_{2} (as in air) to it
- Oxidation
