= Butallylonal =

Chemical compound

Clinical data
- ATC code: none

Legal status
- Legal status: CA: Schedule IV

Identifiers
- IUPAC name: 5-sec-Butyl-5-(beta-bromoallyl)barbituric acid
- CAS Number: 1142-70-7
- PubChem CID: 14362
- ChemSpider: 13723
- UNII: H223WHY93B
- ChEMBL: ChEMBL469253
- CompTox Dashboard (EPA): DTXSID10871829
- ECHA InfoCard: 100.013.215

Chemical and physical data
- Formula: C_{11}H_{15}BrN_{2}O_{3}
- Molar mass: 303.156 g·mol^{−1}
- 3D model (JSmol): Interactive image
- SMILES: O=C1NC(=O)NC(=O)C1(C(C)CC)CC(\Br)=C
- InChI: InChI=1S/C11H15BrN2O3/c1-4-6(2)11(5-7(3)12)8(15)13-10(17)14-9(11)16/h6H,3-5H2,1-2H3,(H2,13,14,15,16,17); Key:FWZMBTIUIQUJFF-UHFFFAOYSA-N

Butallylonal is a barbiturate derivative invented in the 1920s. It has sedative properties, and was used primarily as an anaesthetic in veterinary medicine. Butallylonal is considered similar in effects to pentobarbital but is longer in action, being considered an intermediate-acting barbiturate rather than short-acting.
