= Ampromide =

Index of chemical compounds with the same name.

Ampromides are a class of opioid drugs which includes:

- Diampromide
- Phenampromide
- Propiram
