= N-Octyl bicycloheptene dicarboximide =

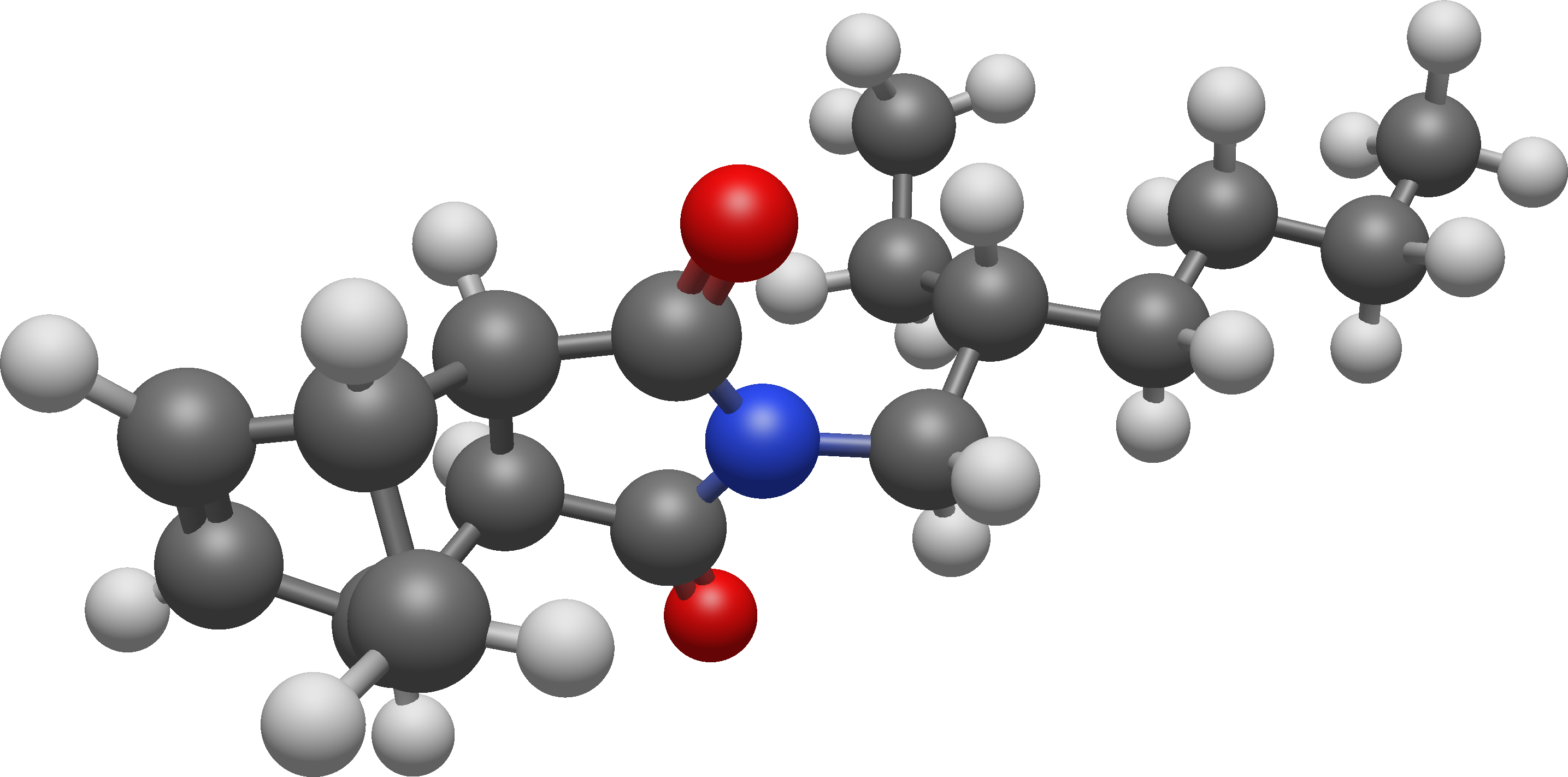

Names
- IUPAC name 4-(2-Ethyl-hexyl)-4-aza-tricyclo[5.2.1.0^{2,6}]dec-8-ene-3,5-dione
- Other names MGK-264; Pyrodone; N-(2-Ethylhexyl)-5-norbornene-2,3-dicarboximide

Identifiers
CAS Number	113-48-4
3D model (JSmol)	Interactive image
ChEBI	CHEBI:81966
ChEMBL	ChEMBL1874490
ChemSpider	7934
ECHA InfoCard	100.003.663
KEGG	C18795
PubChem CID	8227
UNII	1B9RV7L76C
CompTox Dashboard (EPA)	DTXSID6032562
- InChI: InChI=1S/C17H25NO2/c1-3-5-6-11(4-2)10-18-16(19)14-12-7-8-13(9-12)15(14)17(18)20/h7-8,11-15H,3-6,9-10H2,1-2H3 Key: WLLGXSLBOPFWQV-UHFFFAOYSA-N
- SMILES: O=C(N3CC(CC)CCCC)C1C(C3=O)C2C=CC1C2

Properties
Chemical formula	C_{17}H_{25}NO_{2}
Molar mass	275.386 g/mol
- Except where otherwise noted, data are given for materials in their standard state (at 25 °C [77 °F], 100 kPa). verify (what is ?) Infobox references

N-Octyl bicycloheptene dicarboximide (MGK 264) is an ingredient in some common pesticides. It has no intrinsic pesticidal qualities itself, but rather is a synergist enhancing the potency of pyrethroid ingredients. It is used in a variety of household and veterinary products.

MGK 264 is starting to appear on pesticide monitoring lists by states legalizing and mandating pesticide monitoring in medical and recreational cannabis. This is most likely due to the very large amounts of pyrethroids that are used in cannabis monitoring lists and the likelihood of MGK 264 usage to maximize yield.
