= Probarbital =

Chemical compound

Clinical data
- Other names: Probarbital, Ipral, Vasalgin, 5-Isopropyl-5-ethylbarbituric acid
- ATC code: none

Legal status
- Legal status: CA: Schedule IV

Identifiers
- IUPAC name: 5-ethyl-5-isopropylpyrimidine-2,4,6(1H,3H,5H)-trione
- CAS Number: 76-76-6
- PubChem CID: 6455
- ChemSpider: 6213
- UNII: R87TF75S6O
- CompTox Dashboard (EPA): DTXSID30226897

Chemical and physical data
- Formula: C_{9}H_{14}N_{2}O_{3}
- Molar mass: 198.222 g·mol^{−1}
- 3D model (JSmol): Interactive image
- SMILES: O=C1NC(=O)NC(=O)C1(C(C)C)CC
- InChI: InChI=1S/C9H14N2O3/c1-4-9(5(2)3)6(12)10-8(14)11-7(9)13/h5H,4H2,1-3H3,(H2,10,11,12,13,14); Key:HHLXJTDUHFBYAU-UHFFFAOYSA-N

Probarbital (trade names Ipral, Vasalgin) is a barbiturate derivative invented in the 1920s. It has sedative, hypnotic and anticonvulsant properties.
