= Thiamylal =

Chemical compound

Clinical data
- Other names: Thiamylal, Thioseconal, Surital
- AHFS/Drugs.com: International Drug Names
- ATCvet code: QN01AF90 (WHO)

Legal status
- Legal status: BR: Class B1 (Psychoactive drugs); CA: Schedule IV; US: Schedule III

Pharmacokinetic data
- Metabolism: Hepatic
- Elimination half-life: 14.3 h (cats)

Identifiers
- IUPAC name: 5-(Pentan-2-yl)-5-(prop-2-en-1-yl)-2-sulfanylidenedihydropyrimidine-4,6(1H,5H)-dione
- CAS Number: 77-27-0
- PubChem CID: 3032285
- IUPHAR/BPS: 7305
- DrugBank: DB01154
- ChemSpider: 2297298
- UNII: 01T23W89FR
- KEGG: D06106
- ChEBI: CHEBI:9536
- ChEMBL: ChEMBL440
- CompTox Dashboard (EPA): DTXSID3048441
- ECHA InfoCard: 100.000.927

Chemical and physical data
- Formula: C_{12}H_{18}N_{2}O_{2}S
- Molar mass: 254.35 g·mol^{−1}
- 3D model (JSmol): Interactive image
- SMILES: O=C1NC(=S)NC(=O)C1(C(C)CCC)C\C=C
- InChI: InChI=1S/C12H18N2O2S/c1-4-6-8(3)12(7-5-2)9(15)13-11(17)14-10(12)16/h5,8H,2,4,6-7H2,1,3H3,(H2,13,14,15,16,17); Key:XLOMZPUITCYLMJ-UHFFFAOYSA-N

Thiamylal (Surital) is a barbiturate derivative invented in the 1950s. It has sedative, anticonvulsant, and hypnotic effects, and is used as a strong but short acting sedative. Thiamylal is still in current use, primarily for induction in surgical anaesthesia or as an anticonvulsant to counteract side effects from other anaesthetics. It is the thiobarbiturate analogue of secobarbital.
