= Enallylpropymal =

N-methylated oxybarbiturate and anesthetic

Enallylpropymal (INN)

Clinical data
- Trade names: Narconumal, "Methyl Numal"
- Other names: Enallylpropymal
- Routes of administration: IV, oral
- ATC code: none

Legal status
- Legal status: UK: Class D; US: Schedule III controlled substance (de facto as a "derivative of barbituric acid"); Philippines: Class B from 1972-1990; Class F since 1990

Identifiers
- IUPAC name: RS-1-Methyl-5-allyl-5-isopropyl-1,3-diazinane-2,4,6-trione
- CAS Number: 1861-21-8
- PubChem CID: 95636
- ChemSpider: 86329
- UNII: 17BT2X209M
- CompTox Dashboard (EPA): DTXSID40871852
- ECHA InfoCard: 100.015.876

Chemical and physical data
- Formula: C_{11}H_{16}N_{2}O_{3}
- Molar mass: 224.260 g·mol^{−1}
- 3D model (JSmol): Interactive image
- Chirality: Racemic mixture
- SMILES: O=C1NC(=O)N(C)C(=O)C1(C(C)C)CC=C
- InChI: InChI=1S/C11H16N2O3/c1-5-6-11(7(2)3)8(14)12-10(16)13(4)9(11)15/h5,7H,1,6H2,2-4H3,(H,12,14,16); Key:AXJXURWWUFZZKN-UHFFFAOYSA-N

Enallylpropymal (INN; trade name Narconumal) is a rapid-acting anesthetic. It is an N-methylated barbiturate retaining an oxygen atom at the C2 position, in contrast to thiobarbiturates such as thiopentone. It acts as a central nervous system depressant with sedative and soporific effects and was used primarily in Europe as an intravenous anaesthetic induction agent. Chemically, it is N-methyl-5,5-allylisopropylbarbituric acid. The compound and its sodium salt were introduced as potent sedative-hypnotics and were protected by a United States patent granted to Hoffmann-La Roche in 1937. It was marketed principally under the trade name Narconumal and was also known colloquially as "Methyl Numal".

== Chemistry ==
Enallylpropymal crystallizes in a single known crystalline form, consisting of centrosymmetric N–H⋯O hydrogen-bonded dimers built around an essentially planar barbiturate ring, as determined by X-ray crystallography. This distinguishes its solid-state packing from some other N-monosubstituted barbituric acid derivatives, which instead form hydrogen-bonded helical chains. An earlier thermomicroscopic and differential scanning calorimetry study had already established a melting point of 58–61 °C, notably low relative to other N-monosubstituted derivatives of barbituric acid, a finding the crystallographic study's own thermal measurements corroborated.

== History ==
Enallylpropymal was developed by Otto Schneider at Hoffmann-La Roche in 1934 in Switzerland, molecularly identified as N-methyl-5,5-allyl-isopropyl-barbituric acid. The compound was synthesized as a sodium salt modification to improve water solubility and rapid onset for clinical administration.

Dundee and McIlroy (1982) described Narconumal as a "popular" choice of sedative in France, a characterization echoed independently by Ball and Westhorpe (2001) in their historical review of intravenous anaesthesia. Clinical use extended beyond France: Barron's 1962 induction trial (below) establishes that the drug was also supplied and used clinically in the United Kingdom, and case reports document its use for induction of anaesthesia across continental Europe through the late 1940s and early 1950s.

=== Clinical use across continental Europe ===
- Austria: Clinical evaluations recorded the early operational use of intravenous anesthesia using the drug in 1947.
- Italy: Dental and surgical applications for rapid intravenous narcosis were published in Italian medical literature during the same period.
- Germany: A 500-case series published in Die Medizinische in 1952 provided data on its profile during short-duration narcoses.

=== David Barron study ===
In 1961-62, David W. Barron at The Queen's University of Belfast compared the induction characteristics of enallylpropymal with a brominated oxybarbiturate analog Narcodorm, with thiopentone as a reference standard. For the trial, Narconumal was supplied by Roche Products Ltd. Both drugs produced a fairly high incidence of excitatory phenomena — more pronounced with atropine premedication than with opiate premedication — as well as hypotension. in 1982, Dundee and McIlroy separately reported that Barron had found a particularly high incidence of muscle movement associated with Narconumal's use during induction.

== Legal status ==
Federal drug policy of the United States designates 5-allyl-5-isopropyl-1-methylbarbituric acid and the trade name Narconumal as a "habit-forming" but "non-narcotic" derived from barbituric acid, thus a Schedule III controlled substance.

In the Philippines, the compound was separately listed as a Schedule B regulated drug under both the trade name "Narconumal-Enallylpropymal" and the generic name "Enallylpropymal". (Note: The same 1972 Philippine list also includes two variant spellings: "Emalilpropimal-Enallylpropymal" and "Enallynymalnatrium." The former appears to be a straightforward transcription variant of "Enallylpropymal." The latter's "-natrium" suffix (from the Latin natrium, sodium) is consistent with the naming convention used elsewhere in the same list for sodium-salt formulations, and may denote the sodium salt of the compound described above — though this identification is not independently confirmed.)
