= 5-((1-Phenylcyclohexyl)amino)pentanoic acid =

Metabolite of phencyclidine (PCP)

Names
- Preferred IUPAC name 5-[(1-Phenylcyclohexyl)amino]pentanoic acid

Identifiers
CAS Number	77160-83-9
3D model (JSmol)	Interactive image
ChemSpider	151498
PubChem CID	173576
UNII	BL9SJ9WN2A
- InChI: InChI=1S/C17H25NO2/c19-16(20)11-5-8-14-18-17(12-6-2-7-13-17)15-9-3-1-4-10-15/h1,3-4,9-10,18H,2,5-8,11-14H2,(H,19,20) Key: RZGZMLICFFEUIQ-UHFFFAOYSA-N; InChI=1/C17H25NO2/c19-16(20)11-5-8-14-18-17(12-6-2-7-13-17)15-9-3-1-4-10-15/h1,3-4,9-10,18H,2,5-8,11-14H2,(H,19,20) Key: RZGZMLICFFEUIQ-UHFFFAOYAJ
- SMILES: O=C(O)CCCCNC2(c1ccccc1)CCCCC2

Properties
Chemical formula	C_{17}H_{25}NO_{2}
Molar mass	275.392 g·mol^{−1}
- Except where otherwise noted, data are given for materials in their standard state (at 25 °C [77 °F], 100 kPa). verify (what is ?) Infobox references

5-[N-(1-phenylcyclohexyl)amino]pentanoic acid, or PCAA, is a metabolite of phencyclidine (PCP). It can be detected in the urine of PCP users by mass spectrometry as means of drug screening.
