= Proheptazine =

Opioid analgesic drug

Clinical data
- ATC code: none

Legal status
- Legal status: AU: S9 (Prohibited substance); BR: Class A1 (Narcotic drugs); CA: Schedule I; DE: Anlage I (Authorized scientific use only); US: Schedule I

Identifiers
- IUPAC name: 1,3-Dimethyl-4-phenylazepan-4-yl propionate
- CAS Number: 77-14-5
- PubChem CID: 60969
- ChemSpider: 54931
- UNII: S23189WW7E
- KEGG: D12677
- CompTox Dashboard (EPA): DTXSID50861628
- ECHA InfoCard: 100.000.916

Chemical and physical data
- Formula: C_{17}H_{25}NO_{2}
- Molar mass: 275.392 g·mol^{−1}
- 3D model (JSmol): Interactive image
- SMILES: O=C(OC2(c1ccccc1)CCCN(C)CC2C)CC
- InChI: InChI=1S/C17H25NO2/c1-4-16(19)20-17(15-9-6-5-7-10-15)11-8-12-18(3)13-14(17)2/h5-7,9-10,14H,4,8,11-13H2,1-3H3; Key:ZXWAUWBYASJEOE-UHFFFAOYSA-N

Proheptazine is an opioid analgesic related to pethidine. It was invented in the 1960s.

Proheptazine produces similar effects to other opioids, including analgesia, sedation, euphoria, dizziness and nausea.

In the United States it is a Schedule I Narcotic controlled substance with an ACSCN of 9643 and a 2013 annual aggregate manufacturing quota of zero. The salts in use are the citrate (free base conversion ratio 0.589), hydrobromide (0.773), and hydrochloride (0.883).
