= Metethoheptazine =

Group of stereoisomers

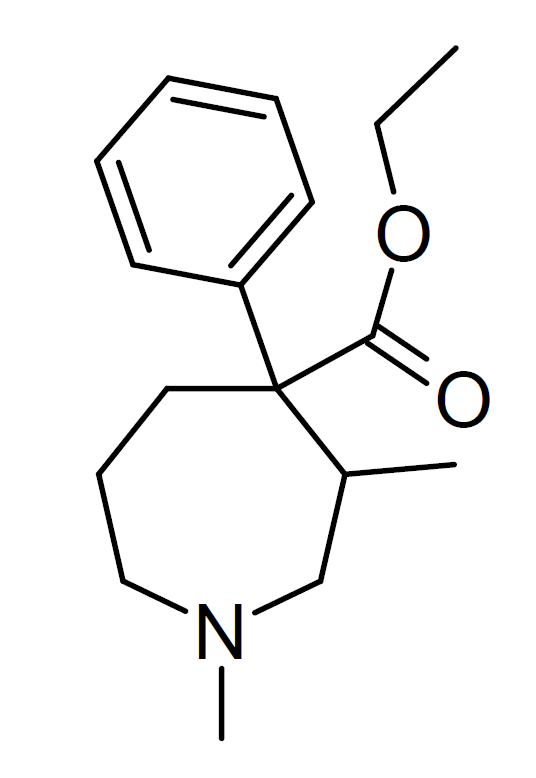

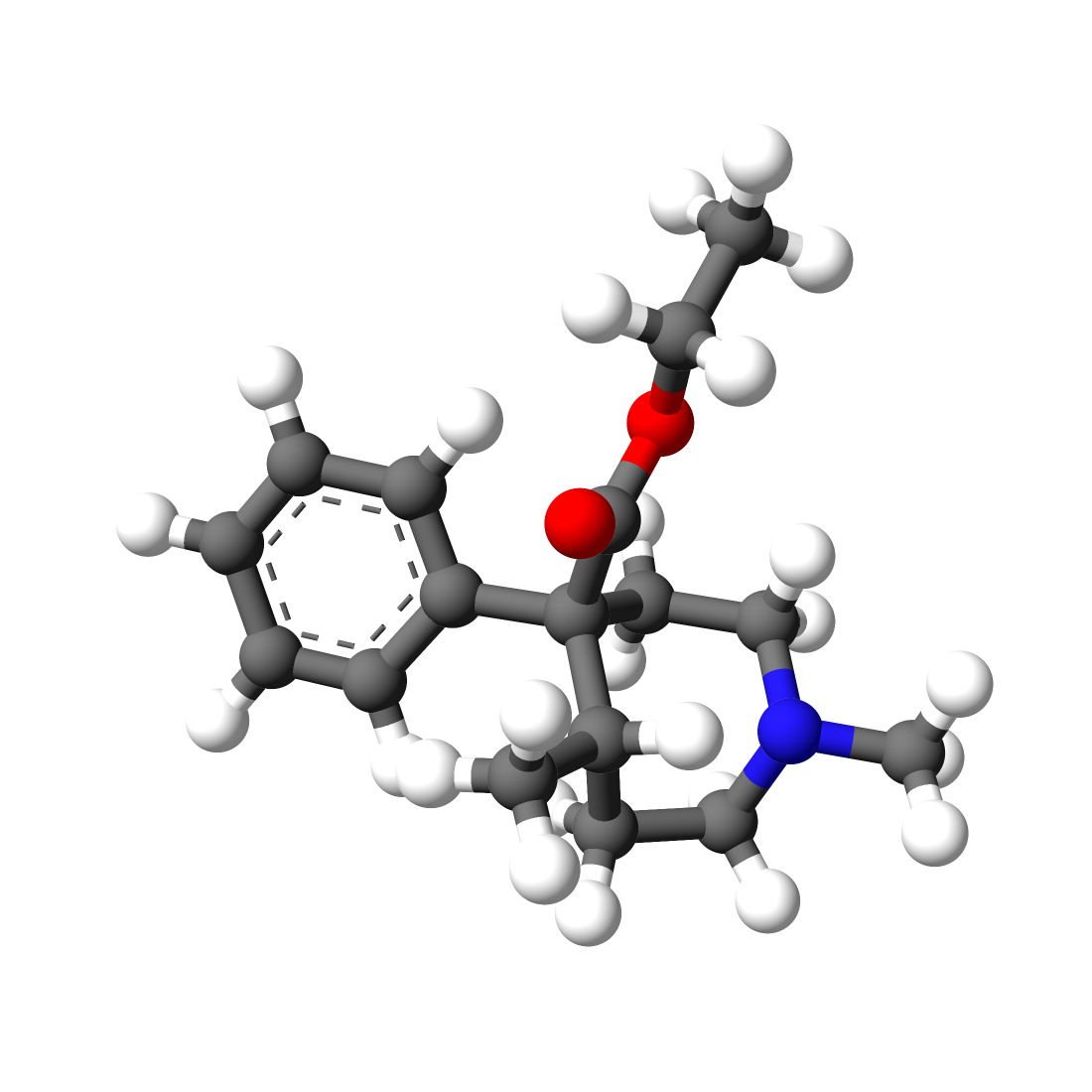

Clinical data
- Other names: WY-535
- ATC code: none

Identifiers
- IUPAC name: ethyl 1,3-dimethyl-4-phenylazepane-4-carboxylate
- CAS Number: 509-84-2
- PubChem CID: 176888
- ChemSpider: 154060
- UNII: S36J5ZY2TH
- CompTox Dashboard (EPA): DTXSID30862077

Chemical and physical data
- Formula: C_{17}H_{25}NO_{2}
- Molar mass: 275.392 g·mol^{−1}
- 3D model (JSmol): Interactive image
- SMILES: O=C(OCC)C2(c1ccccc1)CCCN(C)CC2C
- InChI: InChI=1S/C17H25NO2/c1-4-20-16(19)17(15-9-6-5-7-10-15)11-8-12-18(3)13-14(17)2/h5-7,9-10,14H,4,8,11-13H2,1-3H3; Key:BOSULDNQDJLKKL-UHFFFAOYSA-N

Metethoheptazine (WY-535) is an opioid analgesic from the phenazepine family. It was invented in the 1960s.

Metethoheptazine produces similar effects to other opioids, including analgesia, sedation, dizziness and nausea.

Metethoheptazine is not listed as a controlled substance under the Controlled Substances Act 1970 in the United States. The Canadian Controlled Drugs and Substances Act specifically excludes phenazepine opioids from control.
