= Ethoheptazine =

Opioid analgesic drug

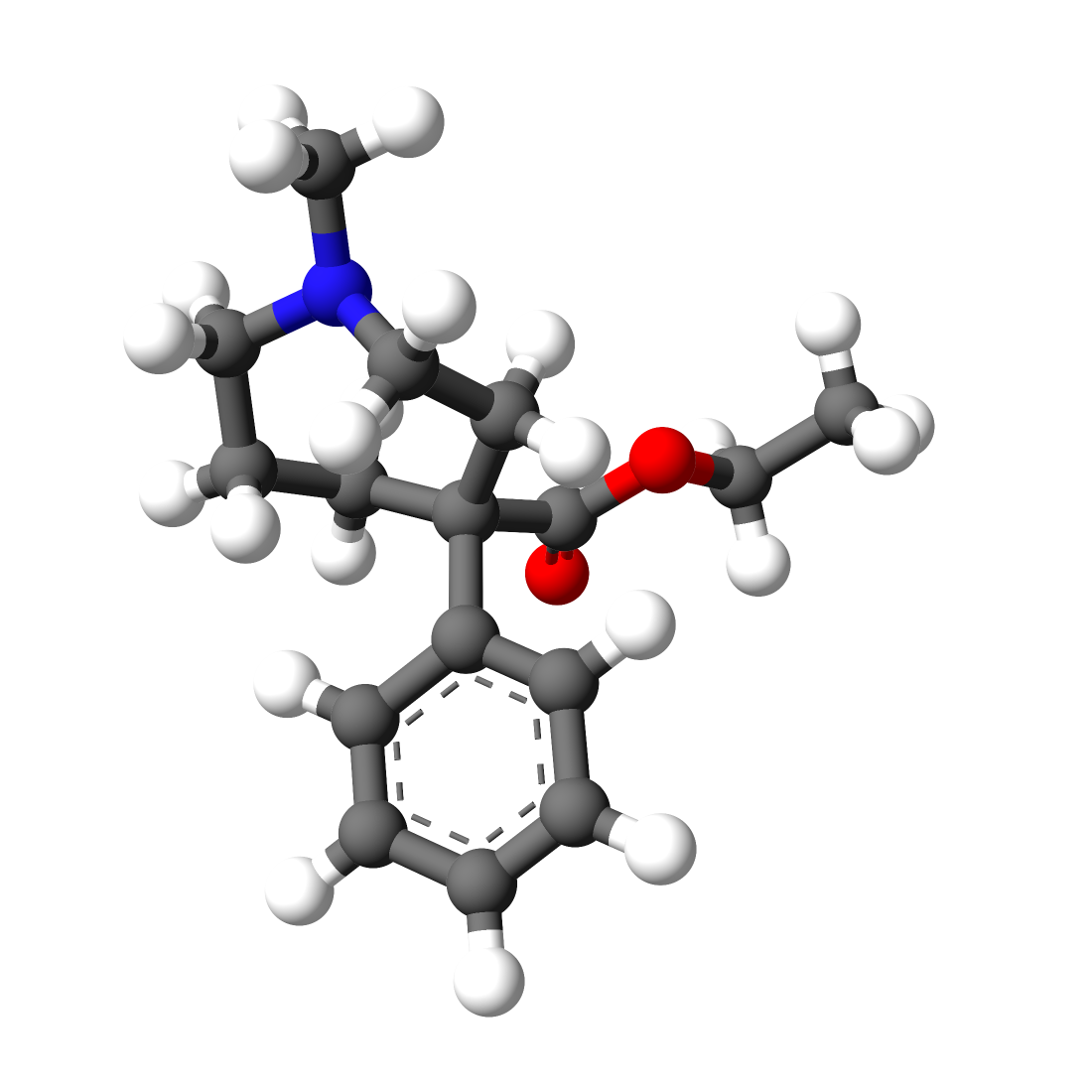

Clinical data
- Trade names: Zactane, Equagesic
- Other names: Zactane
- Routes of administration: Oral
- ATC code: none

Legal status
- Legal status: US: Schedule IV (Some preparations)

Identifiers
- IUPAC name: Ethyl 1-methyl-4-phenylazepane-4-carboxylate
- CAS Number: 77-15-6
- PubChem CID: 6469
- DrugBank: DB08988
- ChemSpider: 6225
- UNII: 3A4G3A848U
- ChEMBL: ChEMBL170797
- CompTox Dashboard (EPA): DTXSID7023017
- ECHA InfoCard: 100.000.917

Chemical and physical data
- Formula: C_{16}H_{23}NO_{2}
- Molar mass: 261.365 g·mol^{−1}
- 3D model (JSmol): Interactive image
- SMILES: O=C(OCC)C2(c1ccccc1)CCN(C)CCC2
- InChI: InChI=1S/C16H23NO2/c1-3-19-15(18)16(14-8-5-4-6-9-14)10-7-12-17(2)13-11-16/h4-6,8-9H,3,7,10-13H2,1-2H3; Key:WGJHHMKQBWSQIY-UHFFFAOYSA-N

Ethoheptazine (trade name Zactane) is an opioid analgesic from the phenazepane family. It was invented in the 1950s and is a ring expanded analogue of pethidine.

Ethoheptazine produces similar effects to other opioids, including analgesia, sedation, dizziness, and nausea. It was sold by itself as Zactane, and is still available as a combination product with acetylsalicylic acid and meprobamate as Equagesic, which is used for the treatment of conditions where both pain and anxiety are present. It was also investigated for use as an antitussive.

It is no longer prescribed, as it is no longer FDA approved, and not available for United States' Pharmacy Processing. Revocation of FDA Approved Medications Status stems from a combination of efficacy vs. toxicity, and the more-varied and historically safer benzodiazepines class. Only reversal of the FDA's decision, allows removing the drug from the CSD. Ethoheptazine is not listed as a controlled substance under the Controlled Substances Act, 1970 in the United States. The controlled status (Schedule IV) of Equagesic was due to the meprobamate content. Regulation elsewhere varies.
