= C5H13N =

The molecular formula C_{5}H_{13}N (molar mass: 87.166 g/mol, exact mass: 87.10480 u) may refer to:

- 1-Aminopentane
- 1-Amino-2-methylbutane
- 1-Amino-3-methylbutane
- 2-Aminopentane
- 2-Amino-2-methylbutane
- 2-Amino-3-methylbutane
- 3-Aminopentane
- Isopentylamine
- Neopentylamine
- N,N-Diethylmethylamine
- N-Methylisobutylamine
