= Aminopentane =

Aminopentane may refer to the following isomers of C_{5}H_{13}N (molar mass: 87.166 g/mol, exact mass: 87.10480 u):

- 1-Aminopentane
- 2-Aminopentane
- 3-Aminopentane
