= C5H9NO =

The molecular formula C_{5}H_{9}NO may refer to:

- 3-Dimethylaminoacrolein
- 2-Ethyl-2-oxazoline
- N-Methyl-2-pyrrolidone
- N-Methyl-4-pyrrolidone
- Piperidinone
  - 2-Piperidinone
  - 3-Piperidinone
  - 4-Piperidinone
- Butyl isocyanate
