= Fentanyl =

Opioid medication

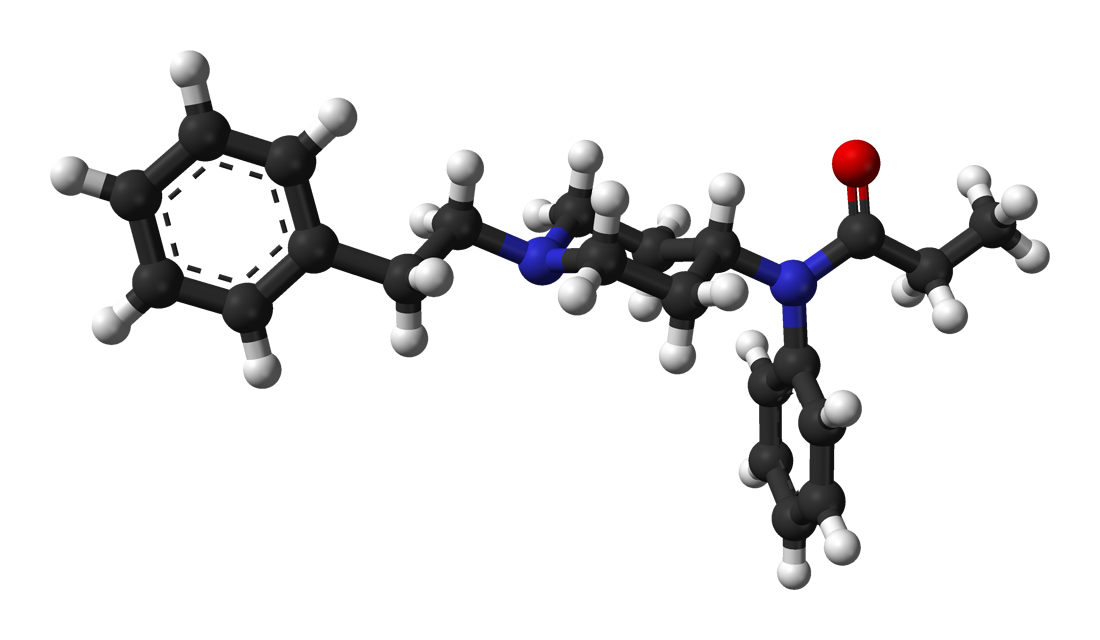

Clinical data
- Pronunciation: /ˈfɛntəˌnɪl/
- Trade names: Sublimaze, others
- AHFS/Drugs.com: Monograph
- MedlinePlus: a605043
- License data: US DailyMed: Fentanyl
- Pregnancy category: AU: C
- Dependence liability: High
- Routes of administration: Buccal, epidural, intramuscular, intrathecal, intravenous, sublingual, transdermal
- Drug class: Opioid
- ATC code: N01AH01 (WHO) N02AB03 (WHO)

Legal status
- Legal status: AU: S8 (Controlled drug); BR: Class A1 (Narcotic drugs); CA: Schedule I; DE: Anlage III (Special prescription form required); NZ: Class B; UK: Class A; US: Schedule II; UN: Narcotic Schedule I; EU: Rx-only; SE: Förteckning II

Pharmacokinetic data
- Bioavailability: Transdermal: 90–92%; Intranasal: 89%; Buccal: 51% (tablets), 71% (film); Sublingual: 54% (Abstral tablets), 76% (spray); Oral: 35%; Inhalation: 56–96%; IM & IV: 100%
- Protein binding: 80–85%
- Metabolism: Liver, primarily by CYP3A4: Norfentanyl; Despropionylfentanyl (minor); Hydroxyfentanyl (minor); Hydroxynorfentanyl (minor secondary metabolite)
- Elimination half-life: IV: 6 mins (T_{1/2} α); 1 hours (T_{1/2} β); 16 hours (T_{1/2} ɣ); Intranasal: 15–25 hours Transdermal: 20–27 hours Sublingual: 5–13.5 hours Buccal: 3.2–6.4 hours
- Duration of action: IV: 30–60 minutes
- Excretion: Mostly urinary (metabolites, < 10% unchanged drug)

Identifiers
- IUPAC name: N-phenyl-N-[1-(2-phenylethyl)piperidin-4-yl]propanamide
- CAS Number: 437-38-7
- PubChem CID: 3345
- IUPHAR/BPS: 1626
- DrugBank: DB00813
- ChemSpider: 3228
- UNII: UF599785JZ
- KEGG: D00320
- ChEBI: CHEBI:119915
- ChEMBL: ChEMBL596
- PDB ligand: 7V7 (PDBe, RCSB PDB)
- CompTox Dashboard (EPA): DTXSID9023049
- ECHA InfoCard: 100.006.468

Chemical and physical data
- Formula: C_{22}H_{28}N_{2}O
- Molar mass: 336.479 g·mol^{−1}
- 3D model (JSmol): Interactive image
- Density: 1.1 g/cm^{3}
- Melting point: 87.5 °C (189.5 °F)
- SMILES: O=C(CC)N(C1CCN(CC1)CCc2ccccc2)c3ccccc3
- InChI: InChI=1S/C22H28N2O/c1-2-22(25)24(20-11-7-4-8-12-20)21-14-17-23(18-15-21)16-13-19-9-5-3-6-10-19/h3-12,21H,2,13-18H2,1H3; Key:PJMPHNIQZUBGLI-UHFFFAOYSA-N

Fentanyl (Note: Pronounced /ˈfɛntənɪl/, FEN-tə-nil.) is a highly potent synthetic opioid of the piperidine family, used primarily as pain medication. It is 50 to 100 times more potent than morphine. Its primary clinical use is in pain management for cancer patients and those recovering from surgery. Fentanyl is also used as a sedative for intubated patients. Fentanyl has a short duration of action and works by activating μ-opioid receptors. Brand names include Actiq, Duragesic, and Sublimaze, among others.

Fentanyl was first synthesized by Paul Janssen in 1960 and was approved for medical use in the United States in 1968. In 2015, 1,600 kilograms (3,500 pounds) were used in healthcare globally. As of 2017, fentanyl was the most widely used synthetic opioid in medicine; in 2019, it was the 278th most commonly prescribed medication in the United States, with more than a million prescriptions. It is on the World Health Organization's List of Essential Medicines.

The effects of fentanyl are similar to those of other opioids, causing sedation and analgesia at clinical doses. The most common adverse effects are respiratory depression, emesis, and asthenia. Bradycardia and apnea are uncommon side effects but are serious and can lead to death outside of clinical settings. Fentanyl exerts its actions as an agonist of the μ-opioid receptor and κ-opioid receptor. The μ-receptor agonism is responsible for the respiratory depression and generalized analgesia whilst the κ-receptor agonism is responsible for sedation and spinal analgesia. Fentanyl is a potent μ-receptor agonist but has less affinity for the κ-receptor.

Fentanyl is contributing to an epidemic of synthetic opioid drug overdose deaths in the United States. From 2011 to 2021, overdose deaths involving prescription opioid (natural and semi-synthetic opioids and methadone) per year remained stable, while synthetic opioid (primarily fentanyl) associated overdose deaths per year increased from 2,600 overdoses to 70,601. Fentanyl was involved in the most drug overdose deaths in the United States in 2018. The United States National Forensic Laboratory estimates fentanyl reports by federal, state, and local forensic laboratories increased from 4,697 reports in 2014 to 117,045 reports in 2020. Fentanyl is often mixed, cut, or ingested alongside other drugs, including cocaine and heroin. Fentanyl has been reported in pill form, including pills mimicking pharmaceutical drugs such as oxycodone. Mixing with other drugs or disguising as a pharmaceutical makes it difficult to determine the correct treatment in the case of an overdose, resulting in more deaths. Emerging adulterants have further complicated the evolving fentanyl supply.

In an attempt to reduce the number of overdoses from taking other drugs mixed with fentanyl, drug testing kits, strips, and labs are available.

== Medical uses ==
=== Anesthesia ===
Intravenous fentanyl is often used for anesthesia and as an analgesic. To induce anesthesia, it is given with a sedative like propofol or thiopental. To maintain anesthesia, inhaled anesthetics and additional fentanyl may be used. These are often given in 15–30 minute intervals throughout procedures such as endoscopy and surgeries and in emergency rooms.

For pain relief after surgery, using fentanyl can decrease the amount of inhalational anesthetic needed for emergence from anesthesia. Balancing this medication and titrating the drug based on expected stimuli and the person's responses can result in stable blood pressure and heart rate throughout a procedure and a faster emergence from anesthesia with minimal pain.

=== Regional anesthesia ===
Fentanyl is the most commonly used intrathecal opioid because its lipophilic profile allows a quick onset of action (5–10 min) and intermediate duration of action (60–120 min). Spinal administration of hyperbaric bupivacaine with fentanyl may be the optimal combination. The almost immediate onset of fentanyl reduces visceral discomfort and even nausea during the procedure.

=== Obstetrics ===
Fentanyl is sometimes given intrathecally as part of spinal anesthesia or epidurally for epidural anesthesia and analgesia. Because of fentanyl's high lipid solubility, its effects are more localized than morphine, and some clinicians prefer to use morphine to get a wider spread of analgesia. It is widely used in obstetrical anesthesia because of its short time to action peak (about 5 minutes), the rapid termination of its effect after a single dose, and the occurrence of relative cardiovascular stability. In obstetrics, the dose must be closely regulated to prevent large amounts of transfer from mother to fetus. At high doses, the drug may act on the fetus to cause neonatal withdrawal. For this reason, shorter-acting agents such as alfentanil or remifentanil may be more suitable in the context of inducing general anesthesia.

=== Pain management ===
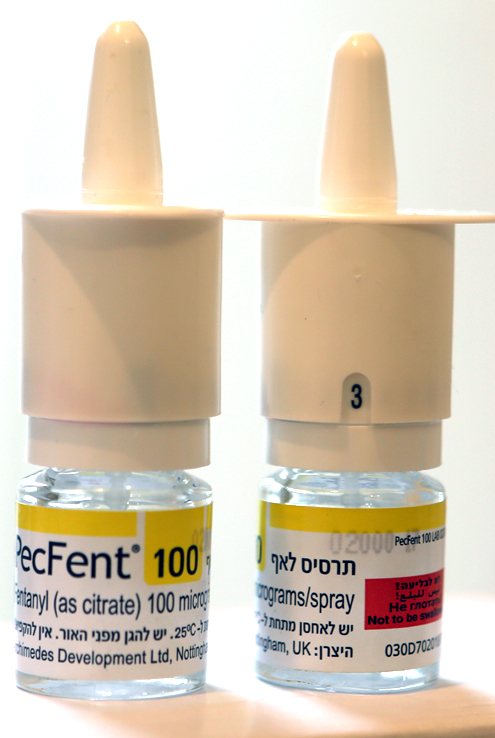
A fentanyl nasal spray with a strength of 100 μg per use

The bioavailability of intranasal fentanyl is about 70–90% but with some imprecision due to clotted nostrils, pharyngeal swallow, and incorrect administration. For both emergency and palliative use, intranasal fentanyl is available in doses of 50, 100, 200, or 400 (PecFent) μg. In emergency medicine, safe administration of intranasal fentanyl with a low rate of side effects and a promising pain-reducing effect was demonstrated in a prospective observational study in about 900 out-of-hospital patients.

In children, intranasal fentanyl is useful for the treatment of moderate and severe pain and is well tolerated. Furthermore, a 2017 study suggested the efficacy of fentanyl lozenges in children as young as five, weighing as little as 13 kg. Lozenges are more inclined to be used as the child is in control of sufficient dosage, in contrast to buccal tablets.

==== Chronic pain ====
It is also used in the management of chronic pain. Often, transdermal patches are used. The patches work by slowly releasing fentanyl through the skin into the bloodstream over 48 to 72 hours, allowing for long-lasting pain management. Dosage is based on the size of the patch, since, in general, the transdermal absorption rate is constant at a constant skin temperature. Each patch should be changed every 72 hours. Rate of absorption is dependent on a number of factors. Body temperature, skin type, amount of body fat, and placement of the patch can have major effects. The different delivery systems used by different makers will also affect individual rates of absorption, and route of administration. Under normal circumstances, the patch will reach its full effect within 12 to 24 hours; thus, fentanyl patches are often prescribed with a fast-acting opioid (such as morphine or oxycodone) to handle breakthrough pain. It is unclear if fentanyl gives long-term pain relief to people with neuropathic pain.

==== Palliative care ====
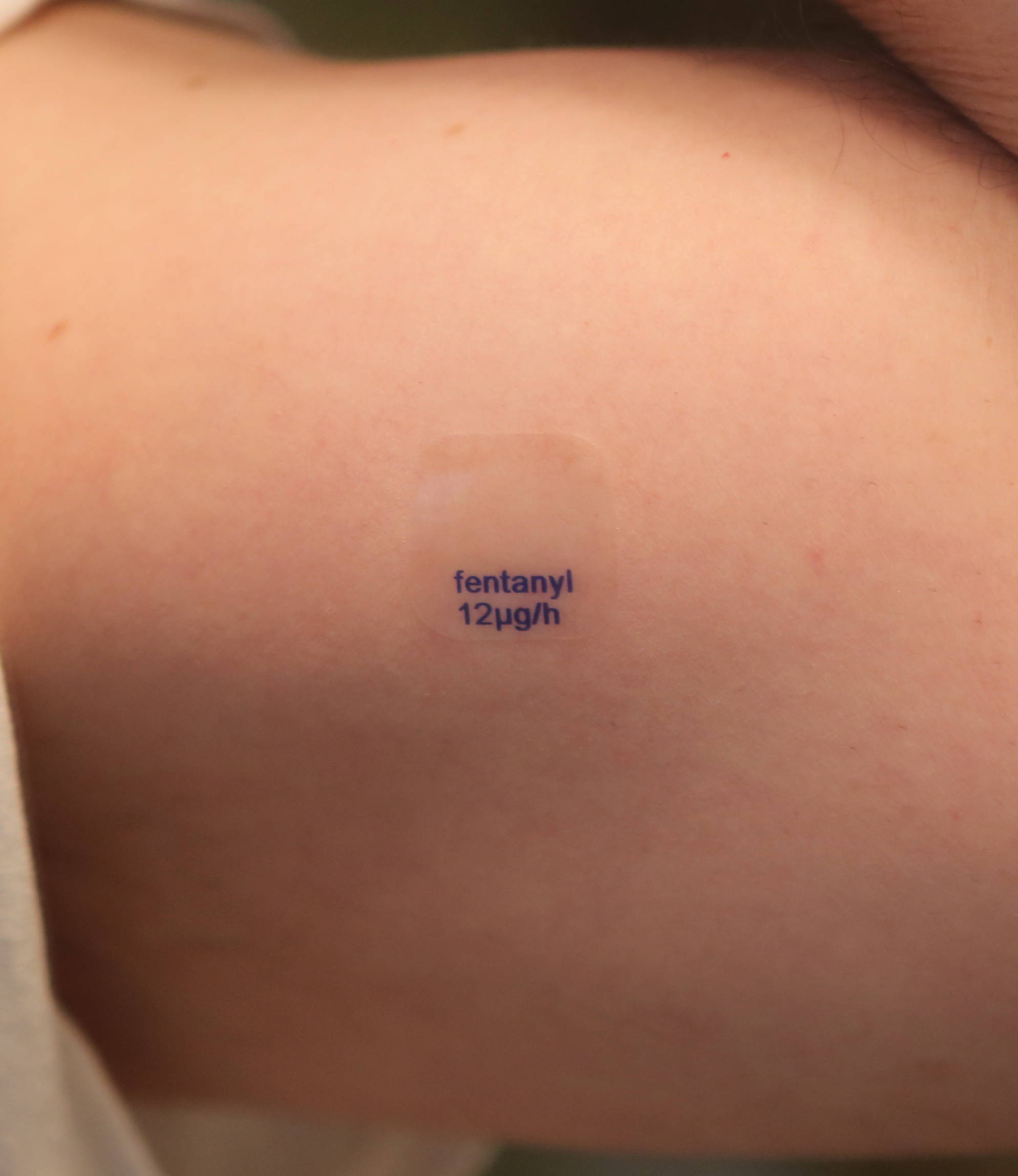
A fentanyl transdermal patch with a release rate of 12 micrograms per hour, on a person's arm

In palliative care, transdermal fentanyl patches have a definitive, but limited role for:

- People already stabilized on other opioids who have persistent swallowing problems and cannot tolerate other parenteral routes such as subcutaneous administration.
- People with moderate to severe kidney failure.
- Troublesome side effects of oral morphine, hydromorphone, or oxycodone.

When using the transdermal patch, patients must be careful to minimize or avoid external heat sources (direct sunlight, heating pads, etc.), which can trigger the release and absorption of too much medication and cause potentially deadly complications.

==== Combat medicine ====
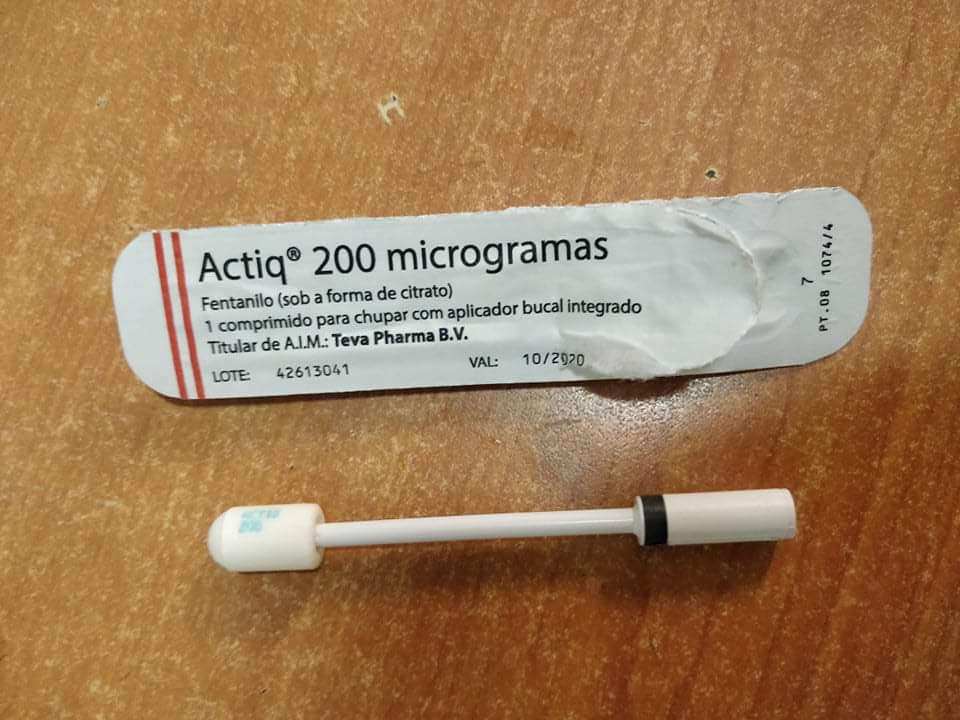
Fentanyl lollipops Actiq 200 mcg

USAF Pararescue combat medics in Afghanistan used fentanyl lozenges in the form of lollipops on combat casualties from IED blasts and other trauma. The stick is taped to a finger and the lozenge put in the cheek of the person. When enough fentanyl has been absorbed, the (sedated) person generally lets the lollipop fall from the mouth, indicating sufficient analgesia and somewhat reducing the likelihood of overdose and associated risks.

==== Breathing difficulties ====
Fentanyl is used to help relieve shortness of breath (dyspnea) when patients cannot tolerate morphine, or whose breathlessness is refractory to morphine. Fentanyl is useful for such treatment in palliative care settings where pain and shortness of breath are severe and need to be treated with strong opioids. Nebulized fentanyl citrate is used to relieve end-of-life dyspnea in hospice settings.

=== Other ===
Some routes of administration such as nasal sprays and inhalers generally result in a faster onset of high blood levels, which can provide more immediate analgesia but also more severe side effects, especially in overdose. The much higher cost of some of these appliances may not be justified by marginal benefit compared with buccal or oral options. Intranasal fentanyl appears to be equally effective as IV morphine and superior to intramuscular morphine for the management of acute hospital pain.

A fentanyl patient-controlled transdermal system (PCTS) is under development, which aims to allow patients to control the administration of fentanyl through the skin to treat postoperative pain. The technology consists of a "preprogrammed, self-contained drug-delivery system" that uses electrotransport technology to administer on-demand doses of 40 μg of fentanyl hydrochloride over ten minutes. In a 2004 experiment including 189 patients with moderate to severe postoperative pain up to 24 hours after major surgery, 25% of patients withdrew due to inadequate analgesia. However, the PCTS method proved superior to the placebo, showing lower mean VAS pain scores and having no significant respiratory depression effects.

== Adverse effects ==
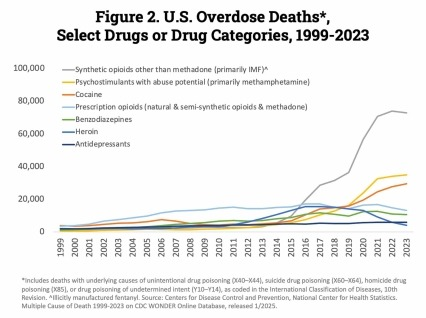
Overall, drug overdose deaths in the United States rose from 2019 to 2021 with more than 106,000 drug overdose deaths reported in 2021. Deaths involving synthetic opioids other than methadone (primarily fentanyl) continued to rise with 70,601 overdose deaths reported in 2021. Those involving stimulants, including cocaine or psychostimulants with abuse potential (primarily methamphetamine), also continued to increase with 32,537 overdose deaths in 2021 (Source: CDC WONDER).

Fentanyl's most common side effects, which affect more than 10% of people, include nausea, vomiting, constipation, dry mouth, somnolence, confusion, and asthenia (weakness). Less frequently, in 3–10% of people, fentanyl can cause abdominal pain, headache, fatigue, anorexia and weight loss, dizziness, nervousness, anxiety, depression, flu-like symptoms, dyspepsia (indigestion), shortness of breath, hypoventilation, apnea, and urinary retention. Fentanyl use has also been associated with aphasia. Despite being a more potent analgesic, fentanyl tends to induce less nausea, as well as less histamine-mediated itching, than morphine. In rare cases, serotonin syndrome is associated with fentanyl use. Existing studies advise medical practitioners to exercise caution when combining selective serotonin reuptake inhibitor (SSRI) drugs with fentanyl.

The duration of action of fentanyl has sometimes been underestimated, leading to harm in a medical context. In 2006, the United States Food and Drug Administration (FDA) began investigating several respiratory deaths, but doctors in the United Kingdom were not warned of the risks with fentanyl until September 2008. The FDA reported in April 2012 that twelve young children had died and twelve more had become seriously ill from separate accidental exposures to fentanyl skin patches.

=== Respiratory depression ===
The most serious adverse effect of fentanyl is respiratory depression, although it is rare in clinical settings. Respiratory depression entails decreased sensitivity to carbon dioxide, leading to a reduced rate of breathing which, if untreated and severe, can cause anoxic brain injury or death. Fentanyl stimulates MORs (mu-opioid receptors) in the preBötzinger Complex located in the ventrolateral medulla of the brainstem, which can depress ventilation. A study found that 100 µg/kg fentanyl given to rats, which in proportion to a dose in humans is 5 µg/kg, resulted in an EEG recording showing higher theta power levels, which significantly correlates to the slowing of respiratory rate. This risk is decreased when the airway is secured with an endotracheal tube, as during anesthesia. The risk is higher in specific groups, like those with obstructive sleep apnea.

Other factors that increase the risk of respiratory depression include:

- High fentanyl doses
- Simultaneous use of methadone
- Sleep
- Older age
- Simultaneous use of CNS depressants like benzodiazepines (i.e. alprazolam, diazepam, clonazepam), barbiturates, alcohol, and inhaled anesthetics
- Hyperventilation
- Decreased CO_{2} levels in the serum
- Respiratory acidosis
- Decreased fentanyl clearance from the body
- Decreased blood flow to the liver
- Renal insufficiency

Sustained release fentanyl preparations, such as patches, may also produce unexpected delayed respiratory depression. The precise reason for sudden respiratory depression is unclear, but there are several hypotheses:

- Saturation of the body fat compartment in people with rapid and profound body fat loss (people with cancer, cardiac or infection-induced cachexia can lose 80% of their body fat).
- Early carbon dioxide retention causes cutaneous vasodilation (releasing more fentanyl), together with acidosis, which reduces the protein binding of fentanyl, releasing yet more fentanyl.
- Reduced sedation, losing a useful early warning sign of opioid toxicity and resulting in levels closer to respiratory-depressant levels.

Another related complication of fentanyl overdoses includes the so-called wooden chest syndrome, which quickly induces complete respiratory failure by paralyzing the thoracic muscles, explained in more detail in the Muscle rigidity section below.

=== Heart and blood vessels ===
- Bradycardia: Fentanyl decreases the heart rate by increasing vagal nerve tone in the brainstem, which increases the parasympathetic drive.
- Vasodilation: It also vasodilates arterial and venous blood vessels through a central mechanism, primarily by slowing down vasomotor centers in the brainstem. To a lesser extent, it does this by directly affecting blood vessels. This is much more profound in patients who have an already increased sympathetic drive, like patients who have high blood pressure or congestive heart failure. It does not affect the contractility of the heart when regular doses are administered.

=== Muscle rigidity ===
If high boluses of fentanyl are administered quickly, muscle rigidity of the vocal cords can make bag-mask ventilation difficult. The exact mechanism of this effect is unknown, but it can be prevented and treated using neuromuscular blockers.

==== Wooden chest syndrome ====
A prominent idiosyncratic adverse effect of fentanyl also includes a sudden onset of rigidity of the abdominal muscles and the diaphragm, which induces respiratory failure; this is seen with high doses and is known as wooden chest syndrome. The syndrome may be a significant and previously unreported cause of death as a result of fentanyl overdoses.

Wooden chest syndrome is reversed by naloxone and is believed to be caused by a release of noradrenaline, which activates α-adrenergic receptors and also possibly via activation of cholinergic receptors.

Wooden chest syndrome is unique to the most powerful opioids—which today comprise fentanyl and its analogs—while other less-powerful opioids like heroin produce mild rigidity of the respiratory muscles to a much lesser degree.

== Overdose ==
In its pharmaceutical form, most overdose deaths attributed solely to fentanyl occur at serum concentrations at a mean of 0.025 μg/mL, with a range 0.005–0.027 μg/mL. In contexts of poly-substance use, blood fentanyl concentrations of approximately 0.007 μg/mL or greater have been associated with fatalities. Over 85% of overdoses involved at least one other drug, and there was no clear correlation showing at which level the mixtures were fatal. The dosages of fatal mixtures varied by over three magnitudes in some cases.

Naloxone (sold under the brand name Narcan) can completely or partially reverse an opioid overdose. In July 2014, the Medicines and Healthcare products Regulatory Agency (MHRA) of the UK issued a warning about the potential for life-threatening harm from accidental exposure to transdermal fentanyl patches, particularly in children, and advised that they should be folded, with the adhesive side in, before being discarded. The patches should be kept away from children, who are most at risk from fentanyl overdose. In the US, synthetic opioids (including fentanyl) were detected in over 29,000 deaths in 2017, a large increase over the previous four years.

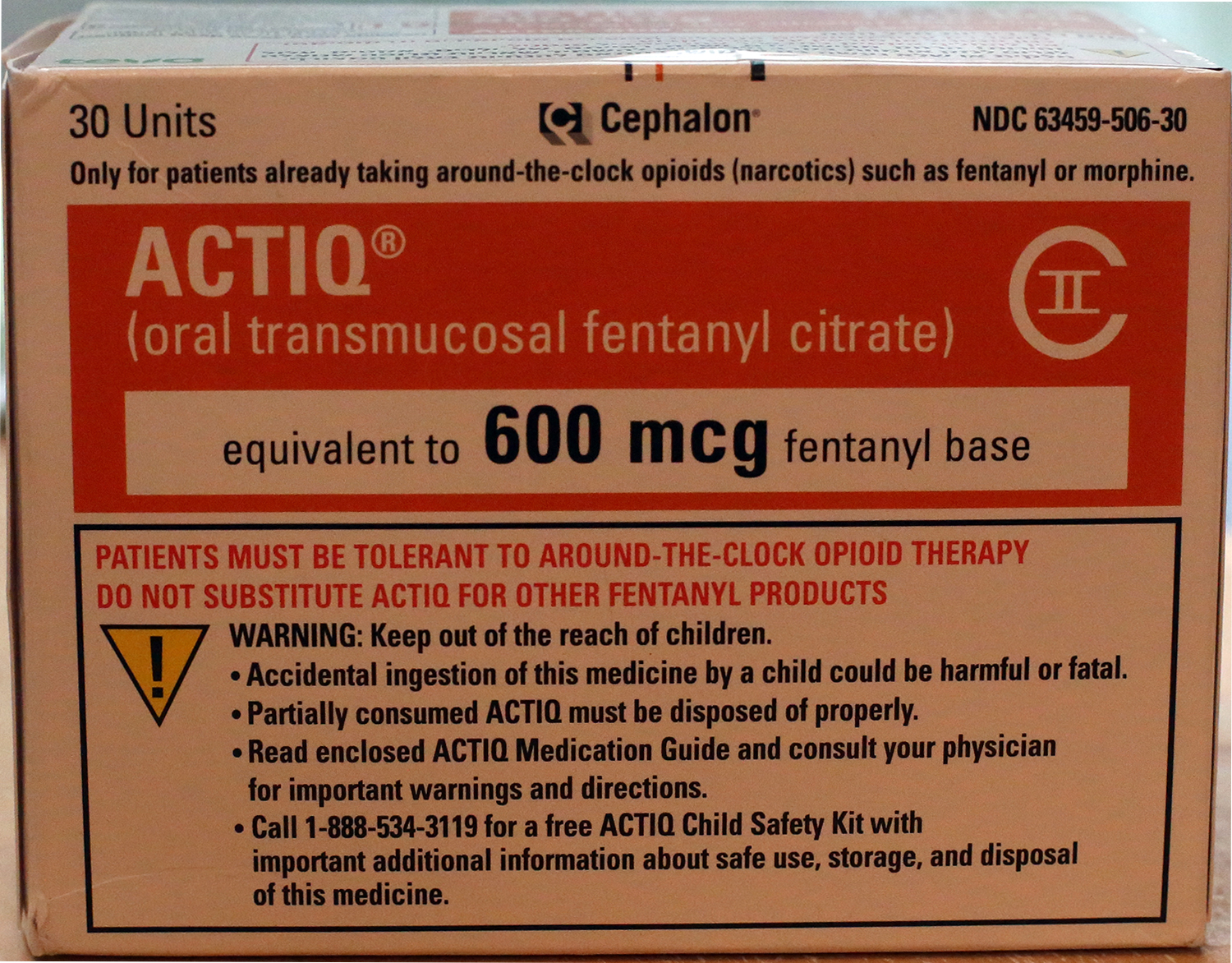
A package of 30 lozenges, 600 mcg of fentanyl, each

Some increases in fentanyl deaths do not involve prescription fentanyl but are related to illicitly made fentanyl that is being mixed with or sold as heroin. In 2017 the death rate increased by more than 100% with 368 overdose-related deaths in British Columbia between January and April 2017.

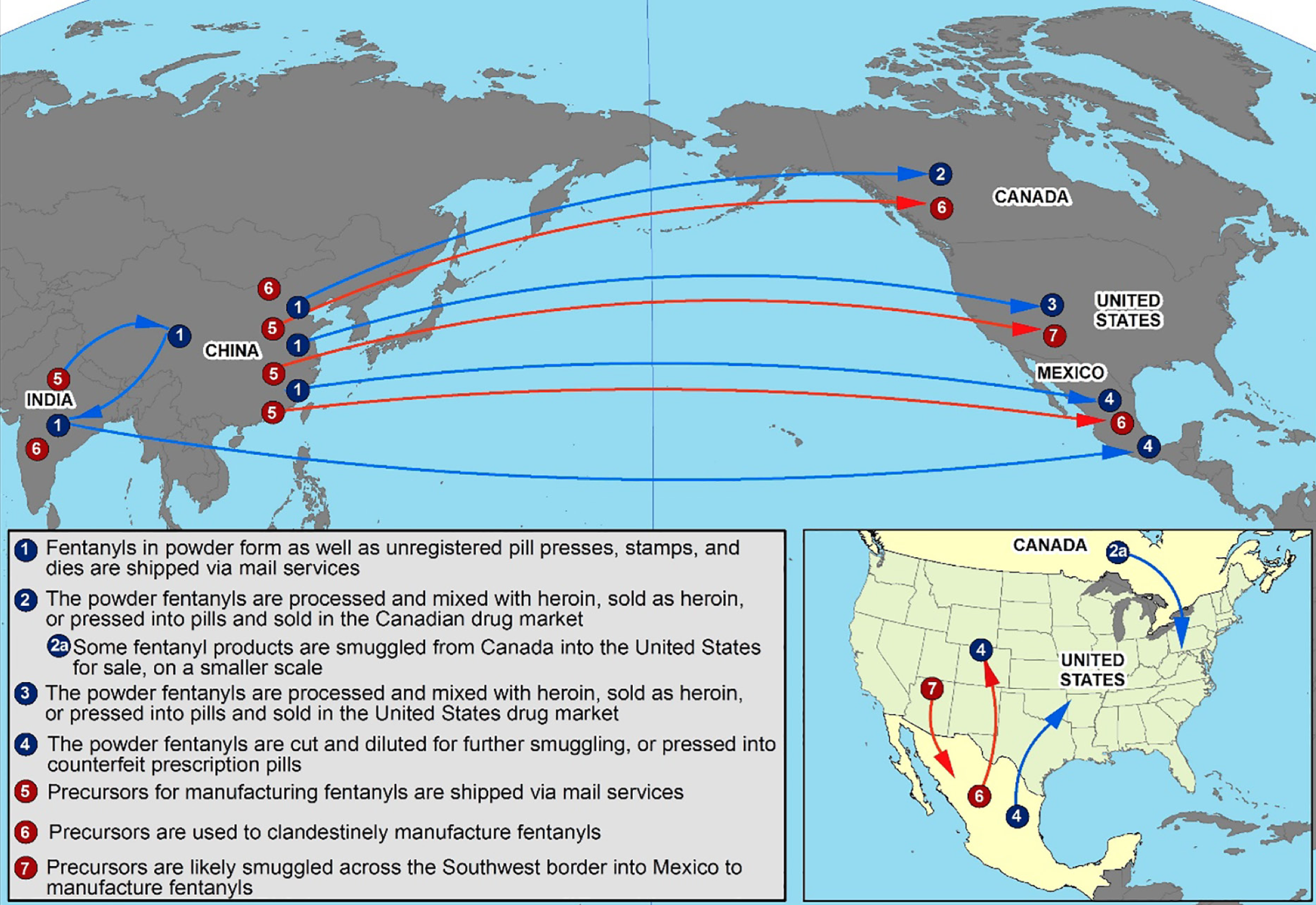
Illegal fentanyl flow to the US from various regions in 2019 according to the DEA

Fentanyl has started to be mixed into illicitly manufactured opioids and benzodiazepines. Fentanyl contamination in cocaine, methamphetamine, ketamine, MDMA, and other drugs is common. A kilogram of heroin laced with fentanyl may sell for more than US$100,000, but the fentanyl itself may be produced far more cheaply, for about US$6,000 per kilogram. While Mexico and China are the primary source countries for fentanyl and fentanyl-related substances trafficked directly into the United States, India is emerging as a source for finished fentanyl powder and fentanyl precursor chemicals. The United Kingdom illicit drug market is no longer reliant on China, as domestic fentanyl production is replacing imports.

The intravenous dose causing 50% of opioid-naive experimental subjects to die (LD_{50}) is "3 mg/kg in rats, 1 mg/kg in cats, 14 mg/kg in dogs, and 0.03 mg/kg in monkeys." The LD_{50} in mice has been given as 6.9 mg/kg by intravenous administration, 17.5 mg/kg intraperitoneally, 27.8 mg/kg by oral administration, The safety margin (Note: Ratio of LD_{50} to ED_{50}) in rats is ~280. The LD_{50} in humans is unknown.

In 2023, overdose deaths in the US and Canada reached record numbers. While overdoses involving fentanyl in the United States have decreased in 2024, the overall percentage of overdoses involving fentanyl has remained stable between 70% and 80% from 2021 to 2024. According to a 2023 report from the United Nations Office on Drugs and Crime (UNODC), the increased numbers of deaths are not related to an increased number of users but to the lethal effects of fentanyl itself. In an article published by Los Alamos National Laboratory, researchers state, "Because of the very high strength of pure fentanyl powder, it's hard to dilute precisely, so small inaccuracies in weight can cause huge variation between batches, and it's all too easy for someone to get too much."

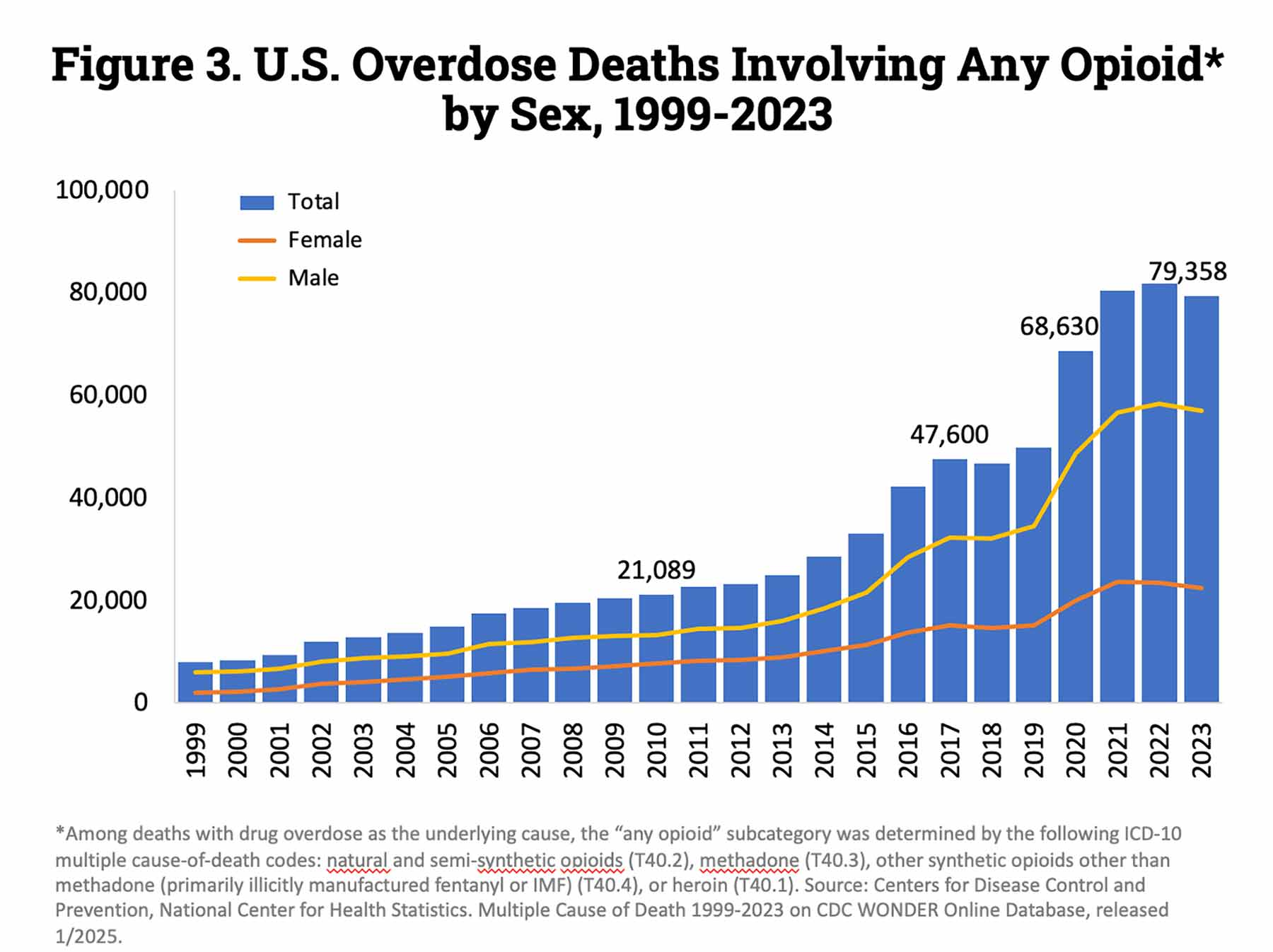
Number of yearly U.S. opioid overdose deaths from all opioid drugs.

In a report published in JAMA Pediatrics, 37.5% of all fatal pediatric opioid poisonings between 1999 and 2021 were related to fentanyl; most of the deaths were among adolescents (89.6%) (15–19 years) and children aged 0 to 4 years (6.6%). According to the UNODC, "the opioid crisis in North America is unabated, fueled by an unprecedented number of overdose deaths."

=== Prevention ===
Fentanyl Test Strip Tutorial

Public health advisories to prevent fentanyl misuse and fatal overdose have been issued by the US Centers for Disease Control and Prevention (CDC). An initial HAN Advisory, also known as a Health Alert Network Advisory ("provides vital, time-sensitive information for a specific incident or situation; warrants immediate action or attention by health officials, laboratorians, clinicians, and members of the public; and conveys the highest level of importance") was issued during October 2015. A subsequent HAN Alert was issued in July 2018, warning of rising numbers of deaths due to fentanyl abuse and mixing with non-opioids. A December 2020 HAN Advisory warned of:

substantial increases in drug overdose deaths across the United States, primarily driven by rapid increases in overdose deaths involving ... illicitly manufactured fentanyl; a concerning acceleration of the increase in drug overdose deaths, with the largest increase recorded from March 2020 to May 2020, coinciding with the implementation of widespread mitigation measures for the COVID-19 pandemic; significant increases in overdose deaths involving methamphetamine.

== Pharmacology ==
=== Classification ===
Fentanyl is a synthetic opioid in the phenylpiperidine family that has high protein binding and lipophilicity.

=== Structure-activity ===
The chemical structure of fentanyl has been used as a basis in modern chemistry for the discovery and nomenclature of many new fentanyl analogues, sometimes called fentalogs.

The structures of opioids share many similarities. Whereas opioids like codeine, hydrocodone, oxycodone, and hydromorphone are synthesized by simple modifications of morphine, fentanyl and its relatives are synthesized by modifications of meperidine. Meperidine is a fully synthetic opioid, and other members of the phenylpiperidine family like alfentanil and sufentanil are complex versions of this structure.

Fentanyl is a weak base that is highly lipid-soluble, protein-bound, and protonated at physiological pH. All of these factors allow it to rapidly cross cellular membranes, contributing to its quick effect in the body and the central nervous system.

=== Fentanyl analogs ===
Fentanyl analogs are types of fentanyl with various chemical modifications on any number of positions of the molecule, but still maintain, or even exceed, its pharmacological effects. Many fentanyl analogs are termed "designer drugs" because they are synthesized solely to be used illicitly. Carfentanil, a fentanyl analog, has an additional methyl ester group attached to the 4 position. Carfentanil is 20–30 times as potent as fentanyl and is common in the illicit drug chain. The drug is commonly used to tranquilize elephants and other large animals.

=== Mechanism of action ===
Fentanyl at opioid receptors
Affinities, K_{i}			Ratio
MOR	DOR	KOR	MOR:DOR:KOR
0.39 nM	>1,000 nM	255 nM	1:>2564:654

Fentanyl acts on opioid receptors. These receptors are G-protein-coupled receptors, which contain seven transmembrane portions, intracellular loops, extracellular loops, intracellular C-terminus, and extracellular N-terminus. The extracellular N-terminus is important in differentiating different types of binding substrates. When fentanyl binds, downstream signaling leads to inhibitory effects, such as decreased cAMP production, decreased calcium ion influx, and increased potassium efflux. This inhibits the ascending pathways in the central nervous system to increase pain threshold by changing the perception of pain; this is mediated by decreasing propagation of nociceptive signals, resulting in analgesic effects.

The affinity of fentanyl to the μ-opioid receptor is similar to that of morphine. The reasons for fentanyl's increased potency in vivo are unclear, however differences in efficacy and pharmacokinetics may be involved. It has high lipid solubility, allowing it to penetrate more easily the central nervous system. It attenuates "second pain" with primary effects on slow-conducting, unmyelinated C-fibers and is less effective on neuropathic pain and "first pain" signals through small, myelinated A-fibers.

Fentanyl can produce the following clinical effects strongly, through μ-receptor agonism:

- Supraspinal analgesia (μ_{1})
- Respiratory depression (μ_{2})
- Physical dependence
- Muscle rigidity

It also produces sedation and spinal analgesia through Κ-receptor agonism.

=== Therapeutic effects ===
- Pain relief: Primarily, fentanyl provides the relief of pain by acting on the brain and spinal μ-receptors.
- Sedation: Fentanyl produces sleep and drowsiness, as the dosage is increased, and can produce the δ-waves often seen in natural sleep on electroencephalogram.
- Suppression of the cough reflex: Fentanyl can decrease the struggle against an endotracheal tube and excessive coughing by decreasing the cough reflex, becoming useful when intubating people who are awake and have compromised airways. After receiving a bolus dose of fentanyl, people can also experience paradoxical coughing, which is a phenomenon that is not well understood.

=== Detection in biological fluids ===
Fentanyl may be measured in blood or urine to monitor for abuse, confirm a diagnosis of poisoning, or assist in a medicolegal death investigation. Commercially available immunoassays are often used as initial screening tests, but chromatographic techniques are generally used for confirmation and quantitation. The Marquis Color test may also be used to detect the presence of fentanyl. Using formaldehyde and sulfuric acid, the solution will turn purple when introduced to opium drugs. Blood or plasma fentanyl concentrations are expected to be in a range of 0.3–3.0 μg/L in persons using the medication therapeutically, 1–10 μg/L in intoxicated people, and 3–300 μg/L in victims of acute overdosage. Paper spray-mass spectrometry (PS-MS) may be useful for initial testing of samples.

=== Detection for harm reduction purposes ===
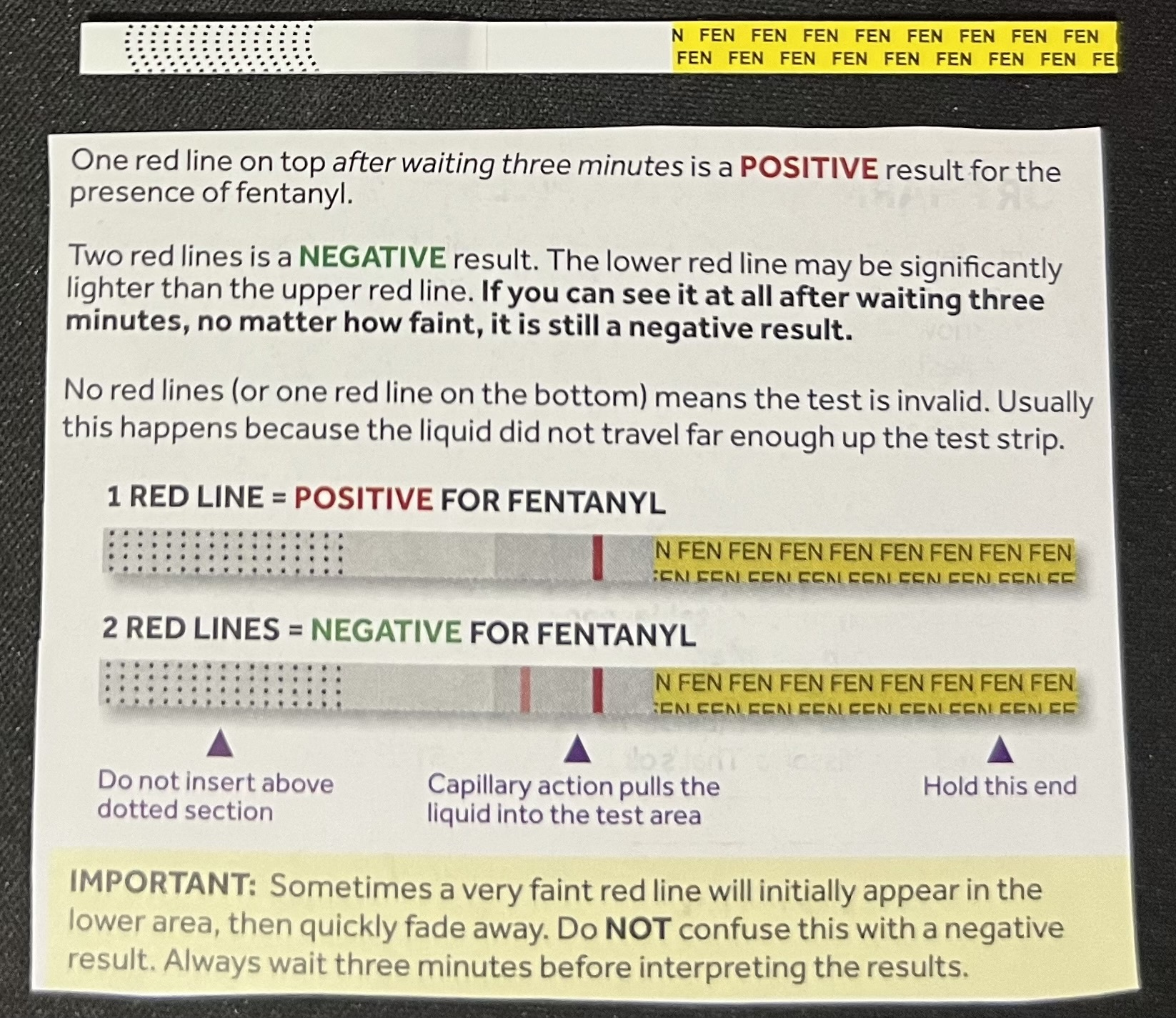
Image of testing strip instructions from the harm reduction organization Dance Safe

Fentanyl and fentanyl analogues can be qualitatively detected in drug samples using commercially available fentanyl testing strips or spot reagents. Following the principles of harm reduction, this test is to be used directly on drug samples as opposed to urine. To prepare a sample for testing, approximately 10 mg of the drug should be diluted into 1 tsp (5 mL) of water. Research in Dr. Lieberman's lab at the University of Notre Dame has reported false positive results on BTNX fentanyl testing strips with methamphetamine, MDMA, and diphenhydramine. The sensitivity and specificity of fentanyl test strips vary depending on the concentration of fentanyl tested, particularly from 10 to 250 ng/mL.

== Synthesis ==
Fentanyl is a 4-anilinopiperidine class synthetic opioid. The synthesis of Fentanyl is accomplished by one of four main methods as reported in the scientific literature: the Janssen, Siegfried, Gupta, or Suh method.

=== Janssen ===
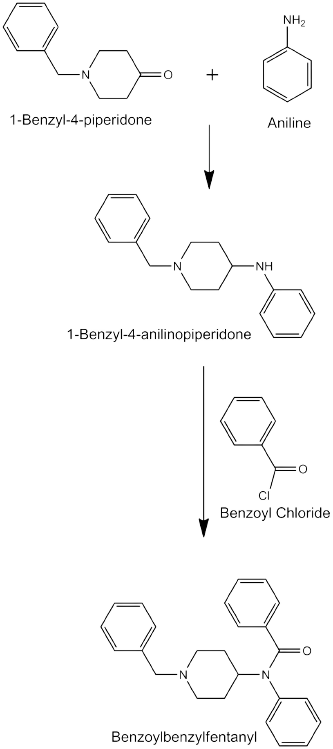
Portion of the Janssen method of synthesis, to synthesize a related opioid

The original synthesis as patented in 1964 by Paul Janssen involves the synthesis of benzylfentanyl from N-benzyl-4-piperodone. The resulting benzylfentanyl is used as feedstock to norfentanyl. It is norfentanyl that forms fentanyl upon reaction with a phenethyl halide.

=== Siegfried ===
Siegfried method from NPP through 4-ANPP to fentanyl

The Siegfried method, initially described in 1978 and later published on The Hive, involves the initial synthesis of N-phenethyl-4-piperidone (NPP). This intermediate is reductively aminated to 4-anilino-N-phenethylpiperidine (4-ANPP). Fentanyl is produced following the reaction of 4-ANPP with an acyl chloride. The Siegfried method was used in the early 2000s to illicitly manufacture fentanyl in the USA and other countries.

=== Gupta ===
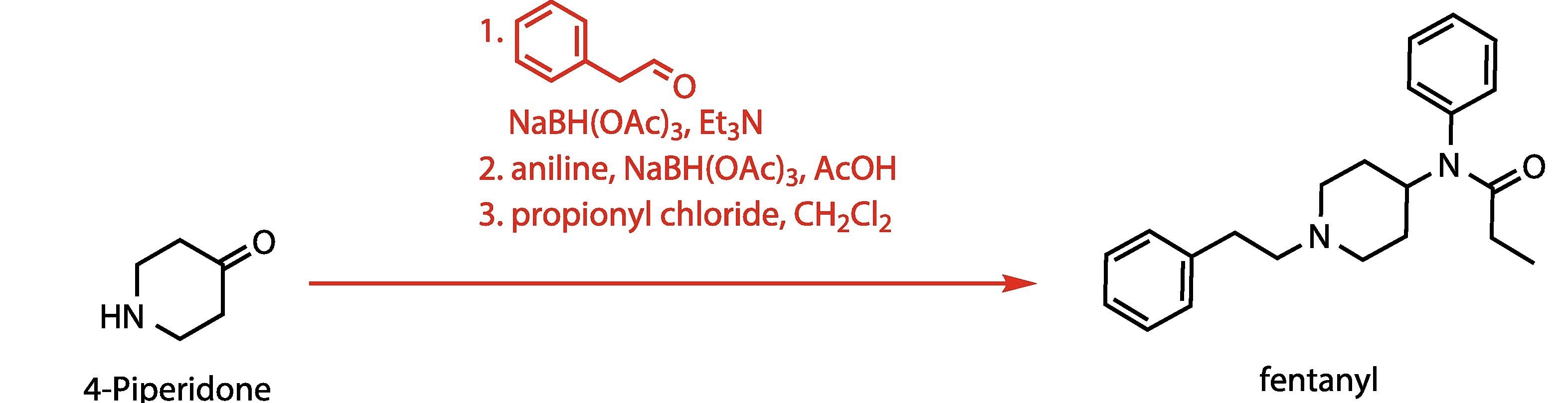
Gupta method from 4-piperidone to fentanyl

The Gupta (or 'one-pot') method starts from 4-piperidone and skips the direct use of 4-ANPP/NPP; rather, the compounds are formed only as impurities or temporary intermediates. For the first half of 2021, the US Drug Enforcement Administration found the Gupta method was the predominant synthesis route in their samples of seized fentanyl. In 2022, Braga and coworkers described a synthesis of fentanyl involving continuous flow with photoredox catalysis that uses reagents similar to the ones described for the Gupta procedure.

=== Suh ===
The Suh (or 'total synthesis') method skips the direct use of piperidine precursors in favor of creating the ring system in situ.

== History ==
Fentanyl was first synthesized in Belgium by Paul Janssen under the label of his relatively newly formed Janssen Pharmaceutica in 1959. It was developed by screening chemicals similar to pethidine (Demerol) for opioid activity. The widespread use of fentanyl triggered the production of fentanyl citrate (the salt formed by combining fentanyl and citric acid in a 1:1 stoichiometric ratio). Fentanyl citrate entered medical use as a general anesthetic in 1968, manufactured by McNeil Laboratories under the brand name Sublimaze.

In the mid-1990s, Janssen Pharmaceutica developed and introduced into clinical trials the Duragesic patch, which is a formulation of an inert alcohol gel infused with select fentanyl doses, which are worn to provide constant administration of the opioid over 48 to 72 hours. After a set of successful clinical trials, Duragesic fentanyl patches were introduced into medical practice.

== Society and culture ==
=== Legal status ===
Effective from May 2019, China officially classified all forms of fentanyl as controlled narcotics.

In the UK, fentanyl is classified as a controlled Schedule II, Class A drug under the Misuse of Drugs Act 1971.

In the Netherlands, fentanyl is a List I substance of the Opium Law.

In the US, fentanyl is a Schedule II controlled substance per the Controlled Substances Act. Distributors of Abstral are required to implement an FDA-approved risk evaluation and mitigation strategy (REMS) program. In order to curb misuse, many health insurers have begun to require precertification and/or quantity limits for Actiq prescriptions.

In Canada, fentanyl is considered a schedule I drug as listed in Canada's Controlled Drugs and Substances Act. Some fentanyl precursors, such as the piperidones (after October 2023) have been banned under its Precursor Control Regulations, which have been in place at least since November 2016.

=== Recreational use ===
Illicit use of pharmaceutical fentanyl and its analogues first appeared in the mid-1970s in the medical community and continues in the present. More than 12 different analogues of fentanyl, all unapproved and clandestinely produced, have been identified in the U.S. drug traffic. In February 2018, the US Drug Enforcement Administration indicated that illicit fentanyl analogs have no medically valid use, and thus applied a "Schedule I" classification to them.

Fentanyl analogues may be hundreds of times more potent than heroin. Fentanyl is used orally, smoked, snorted, or injected. Fentanyl is sometimes sold as heroin or oxycodone, which can lead to overdose. Many fentanyl overdoses are initially classified as heroin overdoses. Estonia has the highest rate of 3-methylfentanyl overdose deaths in the EU, due to its high rate of recreational use.

Another form of fentanyl that has appeared on the streets is the Actiq lollipop formulation. The pharmacy retail price ranges from US$15 to US$50 per unit based on the strength of the lozenge, with the black market cost ranging from US$5 to US$25 in 2007, depending on the dose. The attorneys general of Connecticut and Pennsylvania have launched investigations into its diversion from the legitimate pharmaceutical market, including Cephalon's "sales and promotional practices for Provigil, Actiq and Gabitril."

Non-medical use of fentanyl by individuals without opioid tolerance can be very dangerous and has resulted in numerous deaths. Even those with opiate tolerances are at high risk for overdoses. As with all opioids, the effects of fentanyl can be reversed with naloxone, or other opiate antagonists. Naloxone is increasingly available to the public. Illicitly synthesized fentanyl powder has also appeared on the United States market. Because of the extremely high strength of pure fentanyl powder, it is very difficult to dilute appropriately; often the resulting mixture may be far too strong and, therefore, very dangerous.

Some heroin dealers mix fentanyl powder with heroin to increase potency or compensate for low-quality heroin. In 2006, illegally manufactured, non-pharmaceutical fentanyl, often mixed with cocaine or heroin, caused an outbreak of overdose deaths in the United States and Canada. Deaths were heavily concentrated in the cities of Dayton, Ohio; Chicago, Illinois; Detroit, Michigan; and Philadelphia, Pennsylvania.

=== Enforcement ===
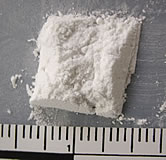
Fentanyl powder (23% fentanyl) seized by police in Ohio, United States

The fentanyl supply chain in Mexico consists of a vast and elusive network, potentially involving hundreds of players. U.S. and Mexican anti-narcotics officials acknowledge that the exact number is unknown. Some brokers operate as specialists within major cartels, while others act independently. A major challenge in disrupting this trade lies in the global chemical industry. Many of the compounds used to manufacture fentanyl have legitimate industrial applications, classifying them as dual-use chemicals. These substances are often unregulated or only lightly controlled in key countries such as the United States, Mexico, and China. This regulatory gap enables brokers to evade detection, navigating between the legal chemical trade and the illicit drug market to acquire the necessary precursors.

Several large quantities of illicitly produced fentanyl have been seized by U.S. law enforcement agencies. In November 2016, the DEA uncovered an operation making counterfeit oxycodone and Xanax from a home in Cottonwood Heights, Utah. They found about 70,000 pills in the appearance of oxycodone and more than 25,000 in the appearance of Xanax. The DEA reported that millions of pills could have been distributed from this location over the course of time. The accused owned a tablet press and ordered fentanyl in powder form from China. A seizure of a record amount of fentanyl occurred on 2 February 2019, by U.S. Customs and Border Protection in Nogales, Arizona. The 254 pounds (115 kg) of fentanyl, which was estimated to be worth US$3.5M, was concealed in a compartment under a false floor of a truck transporting cucumbers. The "China White" form of fentanyl refers to any of a number of clandestinely produced analogues, especially α-methylfentanyl (AMF). One US Department of Justice publication lists "China White" as a synonym for a number of fentanyl analogues, including 3-methylfentanyl and α-methylfentanyl, which today are classified as Schedule I drugs in the United States. Part of the motivation for AMF is that, despite the extra difficulty from a synthetic standpoint, the resultant drug is more resistant to metabolic degradation. This results in a drug with an increased duration.

In June 2013, the United States Centers for Disease Control and Prevention (CDC) issued a health advisory to emergency departments alerting to 14 overdose deaths among intravenous drug users in Rhode Island associated with acetylfentanyl, a synthetic opioid analog of fentanyl that has never been licensed for medical use. In a separate study conducted by the CDC, 82% of fentanyl overdose deaths involved illegally manufactured fentanyl, while only 4% were suspected to originate from a prescription.

Beginning in 2015, Canada has seen several fentanyl overdoses. Authorities suspected that the drug was being imported from Asia to the western coast by organized crime groups in powder form and being pressed into pseudo-OxyContin tablets. Traces of the drug have also been found in other recreational drugs, including cocaine, MDMA, and heroin. The drug has been implicated in the deaths of people from all walks of life—from homeless individuals to professionals—including teens and young parents. Because of the rising deaths across the country, especially in British Columbia where 1,716 deaths were reported in 2020 and 1,782 from January to October 2021, Health Canada is putting a rush on a review of the prescription-only status of naloxone in an effort to combat overdoses of the drug. In 2018, Global News reported allegations that diplomatic tensions between Canada and China hindered cooperation to seize imports, with Beijing being accused of inaction.

Fentanyl has been discovered for sale in illicit markets in Australia in 2017 and in New Zealand in 2018. In response, New Zealand experts called for wider availability of naloxone.

In May 2019, China regulated the entire class of fentanyl-type drugs and two fentanyl precursors. Nevertheless, it remains the principal origin of fentanyl in the United States: Mexican cartels source fentanyl precursors from Chinese suppliers such as Yuancheng Group, which are finished in Mexico and smuggled to the United States.In the past several months before February 2025, China began scheduling fentanyl precursors that are internationally banned. In February 2025, US president Trump imposed a 10% tariff on Chinese imports, claiming the move as a way "to pressure China into taking action on fentanyl" but experts have expressed concern that these tariffs could reverse the progress made under the Biden administration and weaken the international cooperation necessary to combat global drug trafficking.

India has also emerged as a source of fentanyl and fentanyl precursors, where Mexican cartels have already developed networks for the import of synthetic drugs. It is possible that fentanyl and precursor production may disperse to other countries, such as Nigeria, South Africa, Indonesia, Myanmar, and the Netherlands.

In 2020, the Myanmar military and police confiscated 990 imperial gallons (4,500 L) of "methyl fentanyl" [sic], as well as precursors for the illicit synthesis of the drug. According to the United Nations Office on Drugs and Crime, the Shan State of Myanmar has been identified as a major source for fentanyl derivatives. In 2021, the agency reported a further drop in opium poppy cultivation in Burma, as the region's synthetic drug market continues to expand and diversify.

According to the national archives and the Drug Enforcement Administration (DEA), direct fentanyl shipments from China have stopped since 2022. The majority of illicit fentanyl and analogues now entering the U.S. from Mexico are final products in the form of "tablets", and adulterated heroin from previously synthesized fentanyl. From the sophistication of full fentanyl synthesis and acute toxicity in laboratory environments, 'clandestine' labs in Mexico prefer to make an illicit dosage form from available fentanyl rather than the synthesis itself. Based on further research by investigators, fentanyl and analogues are likely synthesized in labs that have the appearance of a legal entity, or are diverted from pharmaceutical laboratories.

Investigations and convictions of members of the Sinaloa drug cartel by federal agencies made a clear connection between illegal arms trafficking from the U.S. to Mexico and the smuggling of fentanyl into the U.S. Mexico had repeatedly made official complaints, since illegal guns are easily purchased (for example in Arizona and as far north as Wisconsin and even Alaska) according to U.S. intelligence sources. The guns are transported onto Mexican territory through a chain of American brokers and couriers, often financed by those drug cartels that also engage in money laundering. Therefore, the lack of arms controls in the U.S. has directly contributed to the U.S. opioid overdose crisis.

The opioid epidemic in the United States is largely fueled by drugs smuggled from Mexico; approximately 98% of fentanyl entering the U.S. comes from Mexico. In January 2025, President Trump said that tariffs on Mexico were intended to reduce the U.S. trade deficit and force the country to secure its border with the U.S. against fentanyl smuggling and illegal immigration.

=== Brand names ===
Brand names include Sublimaze, Actiq, Durogesic, Duragesic, Fentora, Matrifen, Haldid, Onsolis, Instanyl, Abstral, Lazanda and others.

=== Economics ===
In the United States, the 800 mcg tablet was 6.75 times more expensive as of 2020 than the lozenge. As of 2023, the average cost for an injectable fentanyl solution (50 mcg/mL) is around US$17 for a supply of 20 milliliters, depending on the pharmacy. In a 2020 report by the Australian Institute of Criminology, a 100-microgram transdermal patch was valued from between AU$75 and AU$450 on illicit markets. Furthermore, in another 2020 study, the average price per gram of non-pharmaceutical fentanyl on various cryptomarkets was US$1,470.40 for offerings of less than five grams; the average for offers over five grams was US$139.50. In addition, on DreamMarket furanfentanyl (Fu-F), the most common analog on said market, the average price per gram was US$243.10 for retail listings and US$26.50 per gram for wholesale listings.

=== Storage and disposal ===
The fentanyl patch is one of a few medications that may be especially harmful, and in some cases fatal, with just one dose, if misused by a child.

In British Columbia, Canada, where there are environmental concerns about toilet flushing or garbage disposal, pharmacists recommend that unused patches be sealed in a child-proof container that is then returned to a pharmacy. In the United States, where patches cannot always be returned through a medication take-back program, flushing is recommended for fentanyl patches, because it is the fastest and surest way to remove them from the home, preventing ingestion by children, pets or others not intended to use them.

=== State usage as weapon ===
==== US death penalty ====
In August 2018, Nebraska became the first American state to use fentanyl to execute a prisoner. Carey Dean Moore, then one of the longest-serving death row inmates in the United States, was executed at the Nebraska State Penitentiary. Moore received a lethal injection, administered as an intravenous series of four drugs that included fentanyl citrate, to inhibit breathing and render the subject unconscious. The other drugs included diazepam as a tranquilizer, cisatracurium besylate as a muscle relaxant, and potassium chloride to stop the heart. The use of fentanyl in execution caused concern among death penalty experts because it was part of a previously untested drug cocktail. The execution was also protested by anti-death penalty advocates at the prison during the execution and later at the Nebraska State Capitol.

==== Russian theater siege ====
Russian Spetsnaz security forces are suspected to have used a fentanyl analogue, or derivative (suspected to be carfentanil and remifentanil), to rapidly incapacitate people in the Moscow theater hostage crisis in 2002. The siege was ended, but many hostages died from the gas after their health was severely taxed during the days-long siege. The Russian Health Minister later stated that the gas was based on fentanyl, but the exact chemical agent has not been clearly identified.

== Veterinary use ==
Fentanyl is commonly used for analgesia and as a component of balanced sedation and general anesthesia in small animal patients. The short-acting nature, wide safety profile, lower rate of adverse effect compared to other opioids, and high potency make fentanyl one of the most effective and common analgesics in veterinary medicine; the ability to reduce the minimum alveolar concentration leads to fentanyl being commonly used in dogs that are elderly or have cardiovascular issues. Due to its short duration and quick onset, fentanyl is commonly used as a constant rate infusion or as a transdermal patch, with the latter being able to last 3 to 4 days. Fentanyl can provide sedation for dogs. Fentanyl is less common and has more adverse effects in livestock and equine compared to cats and dogs. In horses at analgesic doses tachycardia, restlessness, and excitement occur. Subcutaneous administration often causes pain, but a bicarbonate solution exists which does not cause pain when given subcutaneously.

Fentanyl is highly lipophilic, about 1000 times more than morphine. In dogs it has low protein binding of 15.6% and a half-life of 2–6 hours. In cats the half-life is 2.5 hours. Fentanyl has poor oral bio-availability due to it being metabolized by the liver. Transdermal and transmucosal formulations are common for out-patients, although the latter's efficacy is not well supported by evidence.

== See also ==
- Fentanyl pipe
- List of fentanyl analogues
