= Aureoverticillactam =

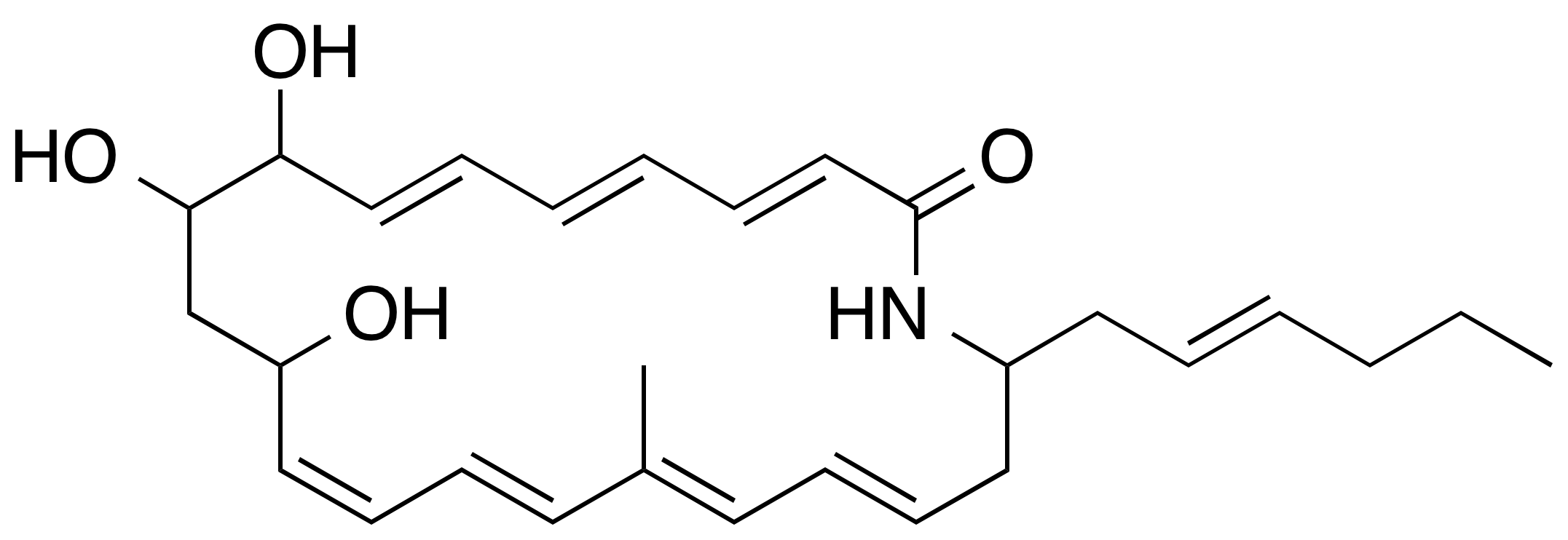

Names
- IUPAC name (3E,5E,7E,13Z,15E,17E,19E)-22-[(E)-Hex-2-enyl]-9,10,12-trihydroxy-17-methyl-1-azacyclodocosa-3,5,7,13,15,17,19-heptaen-2-one

Identifiers
CAS Number	682774-28-3
3D model (JSmol)	Interactive image
ChEBI	CHEBI:218387
ChEMBL	ChEMBL458037
ChemSpider	8044227
PubChem CID	9868536
- InChI: InChI=1S/C28H39NO4/c1-3-4-5-8-17-24-18-13-11-15-23(2)16-12-14-19-25(30)22-27(32)26(31)20-9-6-7-10-21-28(33)29-24/h5-16,19-21,24-27,30-32H,3-4,17-18,22H2,1-2H3,(H,29,33)/b7-6+,8-5+,13-11+,16-12+,19-14-,20-9+,21-10+,23-15+ Key: VMKRIAILWBEBLR-TWCCLTHVSA-N
- SMILES: CCC/C=C/CC1C/C=C/C=C(/C=C/C=C\C(CC(C(/C=C/C=C/C=C/C(=O)N1)O)O)O)\C

Properties
Chemical formula	C_{28}H_{39}NO_{4}
Molar mass	453.623 g·mol^{−1}
- Except where otherwise noted, data are given for materials in their standard state (at 25 °C [77 °F], 100 kPa). Infobox references

Aureoverticillactam is an antifungal macrocyclic lactam with the molecular formula C_{28}H_{39}NO_{4} which is produced by the marine bacterium Streptomyces aureoverticillatus. Aureoverticillactam has also cytotoxic activity.
