= Aspergillus halophilicus =

Scientific classification
- Kingdom: Fungi
- Division: Ascomycota
- Class: Eurotiomycetes
- Order: Eurotiales
- Family: Aspergillaceae
- Genus: Aspergillus
- Species: A. halophilicus

Binomial name
- Aspergillus halophilicus C.M. Christensen, Papavizas & C.R. Benjamin (1959)

Species of fungus

Aspergillus halophilicus is a species of fungus in the genus Aspergillus. It is from the Restricti section. The species was first described in 1959. It has been isolated from dried corn in the United States and a textile in the Netherlands. It has been reported to produce chaetoviridin A, deoxybrevianamid E, pseurotin A, pseurotin D, rugulusovin, stachybotryamide, and tryprostatin B.

== Growth and morphology ==
A. halophilicus has been cultivated on both Czapek yeast extract agar (CYA) plates and yeast extract sucrose agar (YES) plates. The growth morphology of the colonies can be seen in the pictures below.

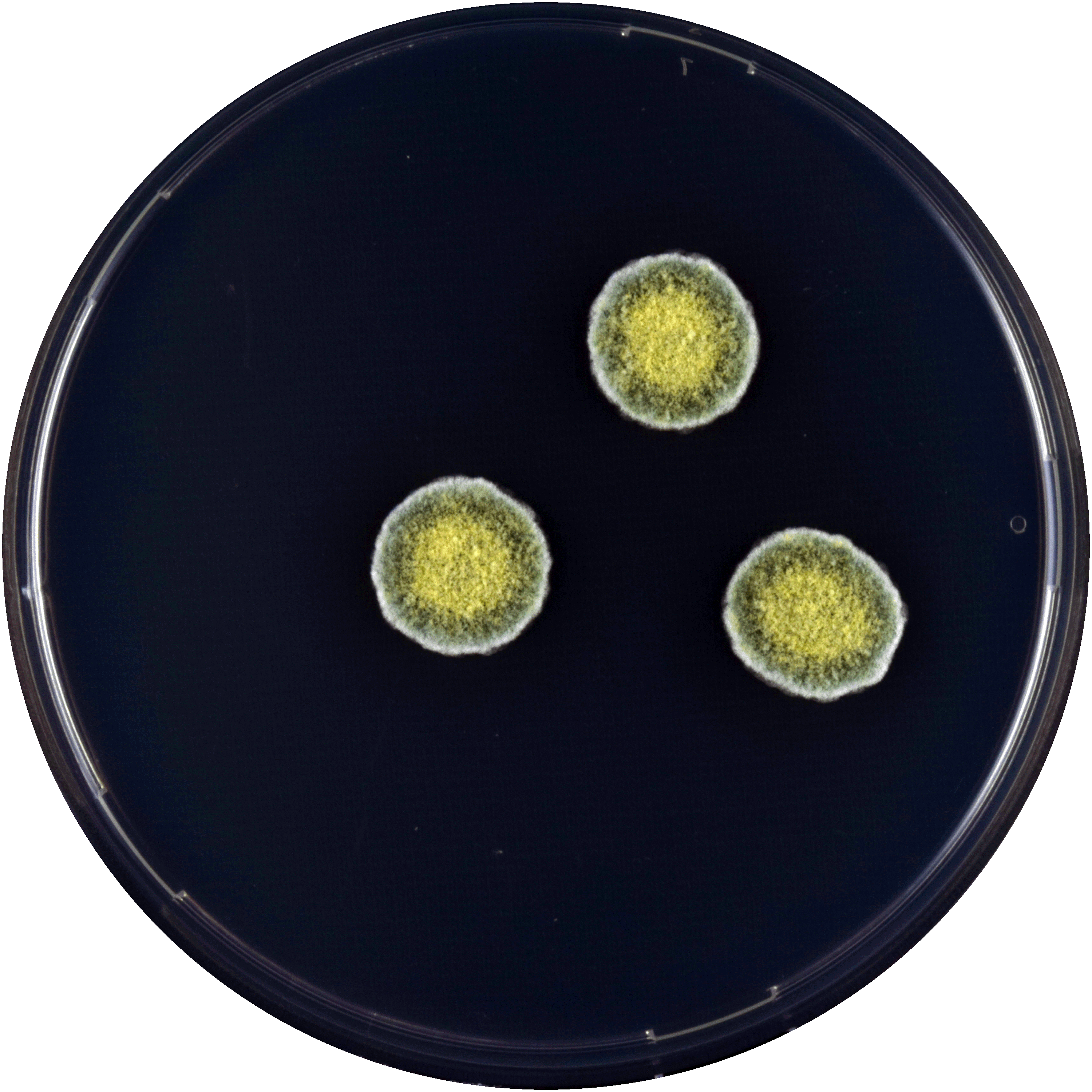
Aspergillus halophilicus growing on CYA plate

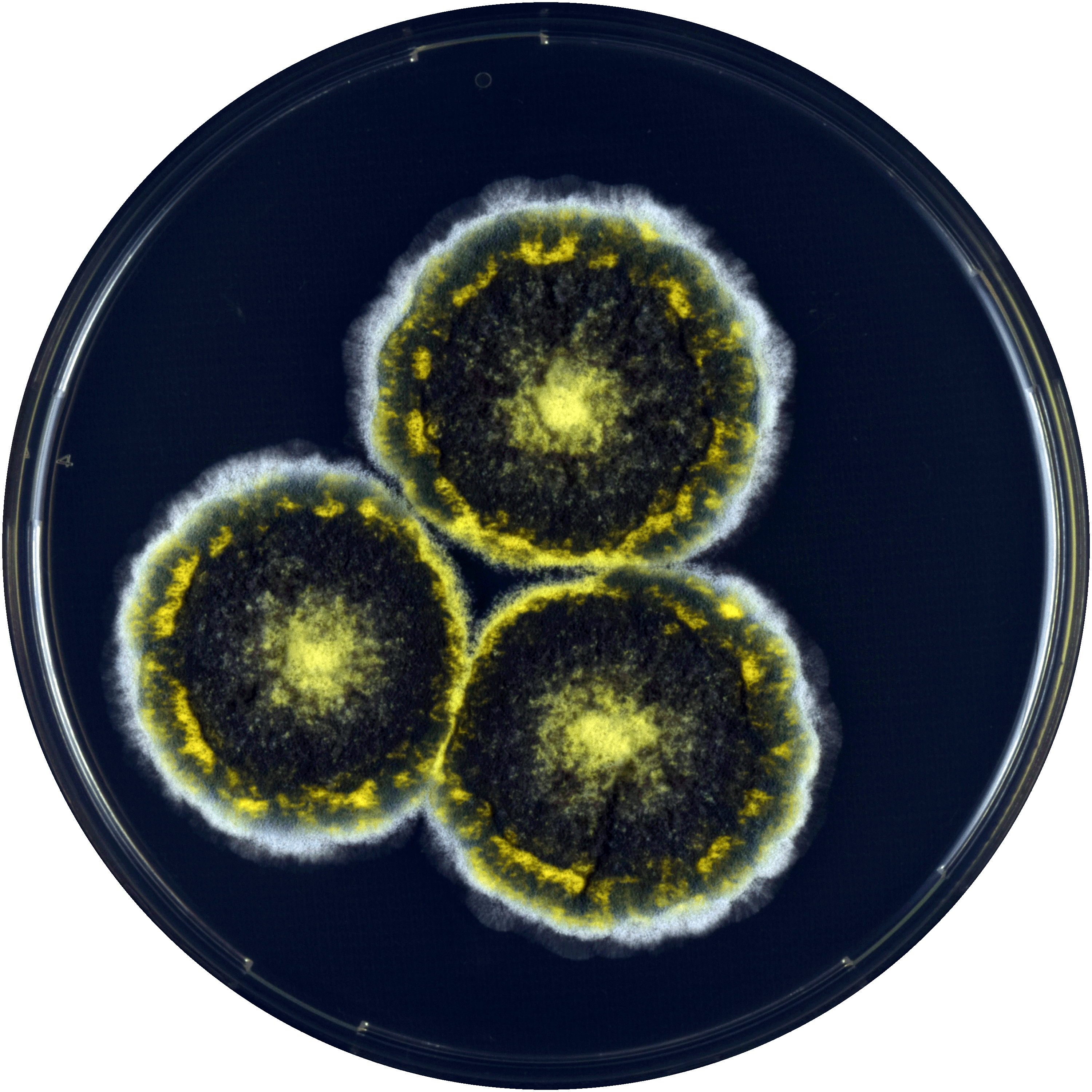
Aspergillus halophilicus growing on YES plate
