= 5-Amino-1-pentanol =

Names
- Preferred IUPAC name 5-Aminopentan-1-ol

Identifiers
CAS Number	2508-29-4
3D model (JSmol)	Interactive image
ChEMBL	ChEMBL333552
ChemSpider	68156
ECHA InfoCard	100.017.926
EC Number	219-718-2
PubChem CID	75634
CompTox Dashboard (EPA)	DTXSID10179771
- InChI: InChI=1S/C5H13NO/c6-4-2-1-3-5-7/h7H,1-6H2 Key: LQGKDMHENBFVRC-UHFFFAOYSA-N
- SMILES: C(CCN)CCO

Properties
Chemical formula	C_{5}H_{13}NO
Molar mass	103.16 g·mol^{−1}
Density	0.9488 at 17 °C
Melting point	38.5 °C (101.3 °F; 311.6 K)
Boiling point	221.5 °C (430.7 °F; 494.6 K)

Hazards
- GHS labelling
Pictograms	(GHS05: Corrosive) (GHS07: Exclamation mark)
Signal word	Danger
Hazard statements	H302, H314
Precautionary statements	P260, P264, P264+P265, P270, P280, P301+P317, P301+P330+P331, P302+P361+P354, P304+P340, P305+P354+P338, P316, P317, P321, P330, P363, P405, P501
- Except where otherwise noted, data are given for materials in their standard state (at 25 °C [77 °F], 100 kPa). Infobox references

5-Amino-1-pentanol is an amino alcohol with a primary amino group and a primary hydroxy group at the ends of a linear C_{5}-alkanes. As a derivative of the platform chemical furfural (that is easily accessible from pentoses), 5-amino-1-pentanol may become increasingly important in the future as a building block for biodegradable polyesteramides and as a starting material for valerolactam — the monomer for polyamides.

== Occurrence and preparation ==
The complete hydrogenation of furfural (furan-2-aldehyde) yields tetrahydrofurfuryl alcohol (2-hydroxymethyltetrahydrofuran), which undergoes ring expansion upon dehydration to give dihydropyran. Dihydropyran reacts with ammonia in a reductive amination under ring opening to produce 5-amino-1-pentanol.

synthesis of 5-amino-1-pentanol from dihydropyran

Product yields of up to 85% can be achieved with a continuous process using a nickel-hydrotalcite catalyst.

Similarly, the hemiacetal 2-hydroxytetrahydropyran that is formed from dihydropyran with hydrochloric acid can be converted to 5-amino-1-pentanol by reductive amidation with ammonia and hydrogen upon water elimination.

synthesis of 5-amino-1-pentanol from 2-hydroxytetrahydropyran

== Properties ==
5-Amino-1-pentanol forms white crystalline clumps at solidification temperatures around 35 °C, which dissolve in water, ethanol, and acetone. The aqueous solution (500 g-l^{−1}) reacts strongly alkaline (pH 13.2 at 20 °C).

== Reactions ==
Amino alcohols such as 5-amino-1-pentanol have been studied for their suitability of absorption of carbon dioxide.

5-Amino-1-pentanol dehydrates when heated over ytterbium(III) oxide (Yb_{2}O_{3}) to give 4-penten-1-amine (I). Also formed piperidine (II), 2,3,4,5-tetrahydropyridine (III), and 1-pentylamine (IV).

dehydration of 5-amino-1-pentanol

Being bifunctional, 5-amino-1-pentanol reacts in a polycondensation reaction with esters of dicarboxylic acids (or their cyclic acid anhydrides, such as succinic anhydride) to give polyesteramides. These polymers have been investigated as biodegradable plastics, e.g. absorbable sutures. During the reaction, the succinic anhydride reacts initially with the nucleophilic amino group to form an ω-hydroxycarboxylic acid, which is subsequently polycondensed with carbodiimides, such as the hydrochloride of 1-ethyl-3-(3-dimethylaminopropyl)carbodiimides (EDC-HCl).

polyesteramides with 5-amino-1-pentanol and succinic anhydride

In a dehydrogenation, catalyzed by rhodium and ruthenium complexes, valerolactam, the δ-lactam of 5-aminopentanoic acid, is formed from 5-amino-1-pentanol in high (94%) yield.

valerolactam formation from 5-amino-1-pentanol

Valerolactam could be of relevance for polyamide 5. Polyamide 5 has garnered little attention so far but is of interest due to its ferroelectricity.
