= 14-Norpseurotin A =

Names
- Preferred IUPAC name (5S,8S,9R)-8-Benzoyl-2-[(1S,2S,3Z)-1,2-dihydroxypent-3-en-1-yl]-9-hydroxy-8-methoxy-3-methyl-1-oxa-7-azaspiro[4.4]non-2-ene-4,6-dione

Identifiers
CAS Number	1031727-34-0
3D model (JSmol)	Interactive image
ChemSpider	23329509
PubChem CID	24900163
UNII	A3BLJ3WUH2
CompTox Dashboard (EPA)	DTXSID401045653
- InChI: InChI=1S/C21H23NO8/c1-4-8-13(23)14(24)15-11(2)16(25)20(30-15)18(27)21(29-3,22-19(20)28)17(26)12-9-6-5-7-10-12/h4-10,13-14,18,23-24,27H,1-3H3,(H,22,28)/b8-4-/t13-,14-,18+,20+,21+/m0/s1 Key: FCGCMRDADMTJIM-LFDIKFNASA-N
- SMILES: C/C=C\[C@@H]([C@@H](C1=C(C(=O)[C@@]2(O1)[C@H]([C@@](NC2=O)(C(=O)C3=CC=CC=C3)OC)O)C)O)O

Properties
Chemical formula	C_{21}H_{23}NO_{8}
Molar mass	417.414 g·mol^{−1}
- Except where otherwise noted, data are given for materials in their standard state (at 25 °C [77 °F], 100 kPa). Infobox references

14-Norpseurotin A is an alkaloid and a bio-active metabolite of Aspergillus, featuring an oxa-spiro-lactam core.

== See also ==
- Pseurotin A
