= Wooden chest syndrome =

Side effect of opioids during anesthesia

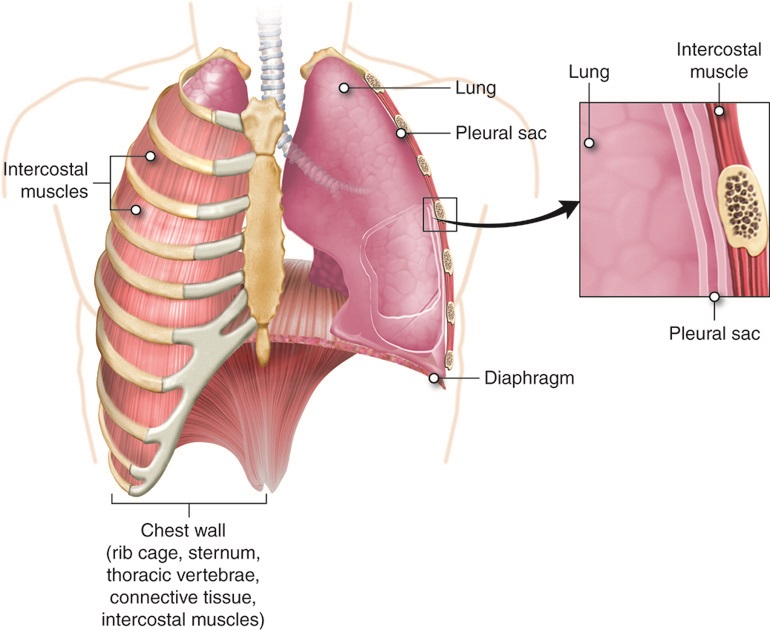
Chest wall

Wooden chest syndrome is a rigidity of the chest following the administration of high doses of opioids during anesthesia.

Wooden chest syndrome describes marked muscle rigidity — especially involving the thoracic and abdominal muscles — that is an occasional adverse effect associated with the intravenous administration of lipophilic synthetic opioids such as fentanyl. It can make ventilation difficult, and seems to be reversed by naloxone. Hypoxemia, hypertension, pulmonary hypertension, respiratory acidosis and increased intracranial pressure may supervene.

One recent study hypothesized that chest wall rigidity might be at least partially responsible for some deaths related to intravenous injection of fentanyl, which increasingly is appearing in samples of heroin.

== Cause ==
The primary cause of Wooden Chest Syndrome (WCS) is the administration of fentanyl, a synthetic opioid widely used in the medical field for its rapid onset of effects. In rare cases, fentanyl can lead to WCS, characterized by severe muscle rigidity that may occur regardless of dosage. There are instances where even minimal amounts of fentanyl cause adverse reactions. Certain patients may be more sensitive to opioids due to genetic predispositions, variations in opioid receptor density, or underlying medical conditions. Additionally, factors such as neuromuscular disorders, recreational use, and pre-existing health conditions can amplify the body's response to fentanyl, increasing the likelihood of WCS symptoms.

Fentanyl (chemical structure)

== Pathophysiology ==
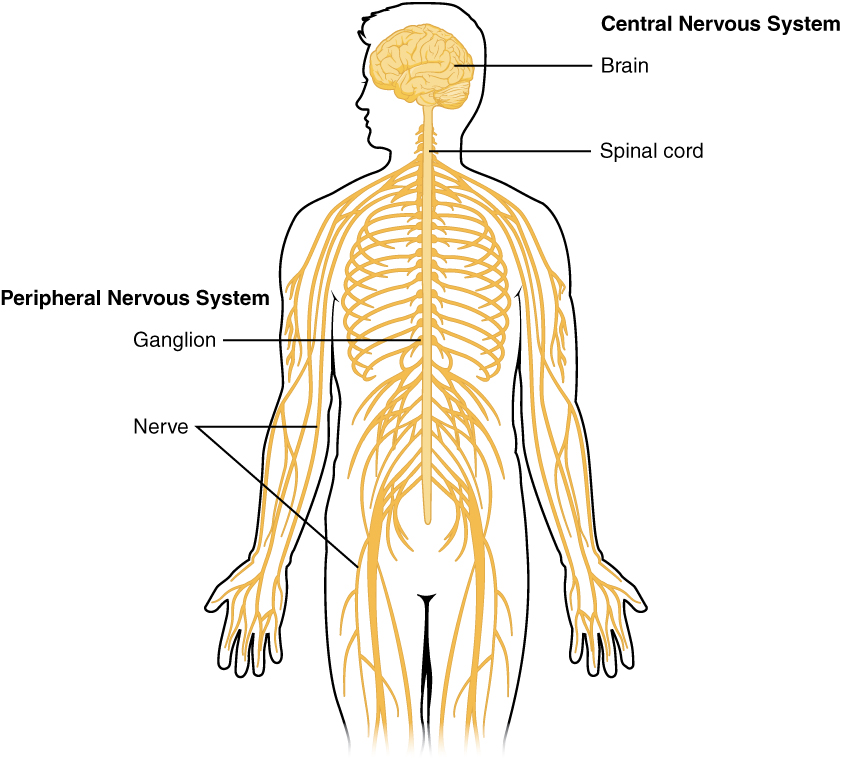
Overview of the nervous system (including CNS)

The pathophysiology of Wooden Chest Syndrome (WCS) is rooted in the binding of fentanyl to mu-opioid receptors in the central nervous system. This interaction triggers a cascade of events that culminates in severe muscle rigidity. Specifically, the activation of noradrenergic and cholinergic reduces chest wall compliance and increases muscle rigidity, leading to ineffective ventilation. Consequently, lung expansion becomes restricted, impairing oxygen intake. Additionally, fentanyl's impact on the brainstem—particularly the respiratory centers—likely diminishes neural output to the respiratory muscles, exacerbating the characteristic rigidity and further compromising ventilation.

== Diagnosis ==
Bronchoscopy (procedure)

The diagnosis of Wooden Chest Syndrome (WCS) is typically made in a healthcare setting, either in an emergency or non-emergency context, by a qualified clinician. This condition is suspected when a patient exhibits rapid-onset respiratory distress following the administration of fentanyl. Key diagnostic indicators include a sudden increase in airway pressures, hypoxia, and resistance to ventilation despite the absence of any apparent airway obstruction.

Diagnosing WCS can be challenging as it requires quick recognition of symptoms and a strong understanding of opioid pharmacology. While diagnostic tools such as bronchoscopy and chest X-ray can help rule out alternative causes, there are no definitive laboratory or imaging tests for confirming WCS. Therefore, diagnosis relies heavily on clinical observation and the temporal relationship between fentanyl administration and the onset of symptoms.

== Treatment ==
Naloxone (chemical structure)

The management of Wooden Chest Syndrome (WCS) begins with the immediate cessation of fentanyl administration, followed by the administration of an opioid receptor antagonist such as naloxone. While naloxone can counteract the opioid's effects, it may not fully alleviate muscle rigidity. To address restricted breathing, respiratory support through mechanical ventilation is often required.

In cases of severe muscle rigidity, neuromuscular blocking agents such as rocuronium can be administered to relax the muscles and restore effective ventilation. Additionally, non-pharmacological measures, such as manual ventilation and optimizing the patient's body positioning, can be employed to improve breathing while waiting for pharmacological treatments to take effect. These combined approaches ensure rapid stabilization and symptom relief.

== Prognosis ==
The prognosis for Wooden Chest Syndrome (WCS) varies on a case-by-case basis. With prompt diagnosis and effective treatment, most patients can recover fully without long-term complications. However, delayed treatment or misdiagnosis can lead to severe outcomes, including respiratory failure and potentially fatal consequences.

The risk of recurrence is higher among individuals with opioid dependence (e.g., recreational use) or those undergoing repeated medical procedures requiring fentanyl administration. While no genetic risk factors have been identified, the prognosis tends to worsen with age. Older adults face a greater risk of severe respiratory complications compared to younger individuals, due to reduced physiological resilience and preexisting health conditions.

Recent cases have highlighted the varied presentations of Wooden Chest Syndrome (WCS). One such case involved a 49-year-old male with chronic obstructive pulmonary disease (COPD) who developed WCS after being placed on pressure-control ventilation following the administration of a tracheostomy tube. In another case, a 73-year-old male was given a fentanyl dose of 750 micrograms on induction and maintained on an infusion throughout a surgical procedure. He began experiencing symptoms of WCS at the end of anaesthesia. Diagnosis was considered confirmed by near immediate reversal with naloxone. Notably, patients with a history of cerebral infarctions are at a higher risk for developing WCS. An 80-year-old male with chronic inflammatory demyelinating polyneuropathy (CIDP) and Guillain-Barré syndrome (GBS) was administered 50 μg of fentanyl before surgery for preoperative anxiolysis. Despite the low dose, the patient soon exhibited complete body rigidity and apneic episodes, leading to severe hypoxia. The rigidity prevented ventilation with a standard airway, necessitating rapid intervention, including propofol administration and the placement of a laryngeal mask airway (LMA) for ventilation. The patient recovered without further complications and had no memory of the event. These cases underscore the importance of careful monitoring and consideration of opioid-sparing techniques, such as regional anesthesia, to minimize the risk of WCS in vulnerable patients.

== Epidemiology ==
Wooden Chest Syndrome (WCS) is a rare condition, but its prevalence is rising due to the increasing use of fentanyl in both medical and recreational settings. While comprehensive demographic data remains limited, current evidence suggests there are no significant correlations between geographic location or ethnic predispositions and the incidence of WCS. The rise in WCS cases is primarily attributed to the widespread availability and use of fentanyl, which is commonly involved in opioid overdoses.

As fentanyl-related incidents become more frequent, healthcare providers are becoming more aware of WCS, which may lead to better detection and diagnosis. The condition's association with fentanyl use in medical procedures, especially in anesthesia and intensive care units, highlights its relevance to healthcare settings. However, due to the rare nature of WCS, its exact incidence remains difficult to track, and ongoing surveillance is necessary to better understand its trends, risk factors, and outcomes.

== Research direction ==
Research on Wooden Chest Syndrome (WCS) needs to focus on understanding its epidemiology, pathophysiology, and effective management strategies. Studies are needed to determine the prevalence of WCS in medical and recreational settings, as well as to identify demographic, genetic, and patient-specific risk factors, such as underlying neuromuscular conditions or opioid receptor variations. Investigating the mechanisms by which fentanyl induces thoracic rigidity, particularly its effects on mu-opioid receptors, the central nervous system, and brainstem respiratory centers, will help clarify the condition's pathophysiological basis.

Efforts should also be directed toward improving diagnostic tools, such as identifying biomarkers or imaging methods for early detection. Research into optimizing treatment protocols, including the use of naloxone, neuromuscular blockers, and alternative ventilation techniques, is critical to managing acute episodes. Preventive strategies, like opioid-sparing anesthesia techniques and clinician education, could reduce WCS risk in vulnerable populations. Finally, addressing the public health implications of rising fentanyl use, especially in recreational settings, and studying long-term outcomes of WCS are key to reducing its overall impact.
