= Norfentanyl =

Synthetic opioid analgesic metabolite and precursor

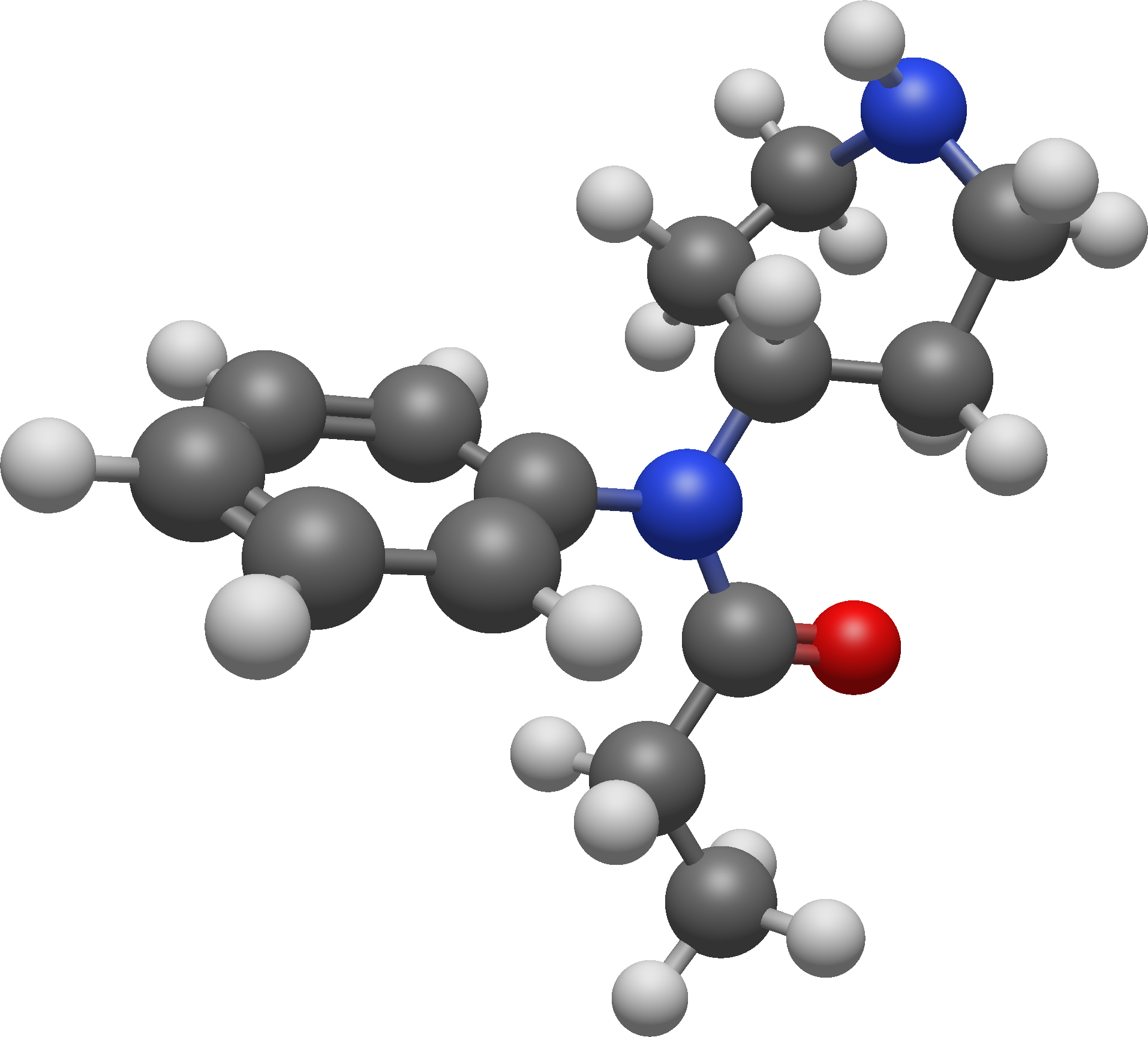

Legal status
- Legal status: BR: Class D1 (Drug precursors)

Identifiers
- IUPAC name: N-phenyl-N-piperidin-4-ylpropanamide
- CAS Number: 1609-66-1
- PubChem CID: 259381
- ChemSpider: 227671
- UNII: 2MK6D8JV6J
- ChEBI: CHEBI:62685
- ChEMBL: ChEMBL3560524
- CompTox Dashboard (EPA): DTXSID2057657
- ECHA InfoCard: 100.015.040

Chemical and physical data
- Formula: C_{14}H_{20}N_{2}O
- Molar mass: 232.327 g·mol^{−1}
- 3D model (JSmol): Interactive image
- SMILES: CCC(=O)N(C1CCNCC1)C2=CC=CC=C2
- InChI: InChI=1S/C14H20N2O/c1-2-14(17)16(12-6-4-3-5-7-12)13-8-10-15-11-9-13/h3-7,13,15H,2,8-11H2,1H3; Key:PMCBDBWCQQBSRJ-UHFFFAOYSA-N

Norfentanyl is an inactive synthetic opioid analgesic drug precursor. It is an analog and metabolite of fentanyl with the removal of the phenethyl moiety (or functional group) from fentanyl chemical structure.

== Occurrence and Applications ==
Norfentanyl occurs primarily as a metabolite of its parent drug, fentanyl. However, it can also be used to synthesize fentanyl itself.

== See also ==
- 3-Methylbutyrfentanyl
- 4-Fluorobutyrfentanyl
- 4-Fluorofentanyl
- α-Methylfentanyl
- Acetylfentanyl
- Benzylfentanyl
- Furanylfentanyl
- Homofentanyl
- List of fentanyl analogues
