= Streptomyces aureoverticillatus =

Scientific classification
- Domain: Bacteria
- Kingdom: Bacillati
- Phylum: Actinomycetota
- Class: Actinomycetes
- Order: Streptomycetales
- Family: Streptomycetaceae
- Genus: Streptomyces
- Species: S. aureoverticillatus

Binomial name
- Streptomyces aureoverticillatus (Krassilnikov and Yuan 1960) Pridham 1970 (Approved Lists 1980)

Type strain
- AS 4.1666, ATCC 15854, ATCC 19726, BCRC 12185, CBS 465.58, CBS 465.68, CCRC 12185, CGMCC 4.1666, DSM 40080, IFO 12742, INMI 1007, INMI 1077, IPV 1821, ISP 5080, JCM 4347, KCC S-0347, NBRC 12742, NRRL B-3326, NRRL-ISP 5080, RIA 1007, RIA 679, VKM Ac-48

Synonyms
- Actinomyces aureoverticillatus

Species of bacterium

Streptomyces aureoverticillatus is a bacterium species from the genus of Streptomyces which has been isolated from soil. Streptomyces aureoverticillatus produces Aureoverticillactam.

== See also ==
- List of Streptomyces species
