= Yuancheng Group =

Chemical manufacturing company

- Native name: 武汉远澄科技有限公司
- Formerly: Wuhan Yuancheng Factory Co., Ltd.
- Type: Private
- Industry: Chemicals
- Founded: 2001; 25 years ago
- Founder: Ye Chuan Fa (叶传发, alternatively spelled as Chuen Fat Yip)
- Headquarters: Wuhan, China
- Number of locations: 30
- Number of employees: 700+ (2019)
- Website: www.yuanchengtech.com

Yuancheng Group, also known as Wuhan Yuancheng Technology Development Co., Ltd., is a Chinese chemical manufacturing company headquartered in Wuhan, China. The company is a notable supplier of precursors for the manufacturing of illicit drugs, such as Methamphetamine and Fentanyl. Yuancheng has approximately 700 employees and 30 locations across China. Yuancheng is designated as a New and High Technology Enterprise and therefore receives additional incentives from the Chinese government.

The COVID-19 pandemic lockdown in China restricted the supply of precursors and resulted in price increases of street drugs in the USA. The supply shortages resulted in price increases and shortages in illegal drugs that were noticed on the streets of the UK. US law enforcement also told the NY Post that Mexican drug cartels were having difficulty in obtaining precursors.
