= Polyesteramide =

Synthetic polymer with unique physical and biodegradable properties

Polyesteramides are a class of synthetic polymers connected by ester and amide bonds.

== Types ==
Common polyesteramides can be separated in to two different types.

=== Nylon-type ===
According to Rainer Höfer, nylon-type polyesteramides can be synthesized through the polymerisation of caprolactam or caprolactone, or through polycondensation of synthetic alcohols like 1,4-butanediol. Nylon-type polyesteramides have been investigated for their use in drug delivery systems and smart materials.

=== Oil-based ===
Höfer described oil-based polyesteramides as "products of a fatty acid alkanolamide with a dicarboxylic acid (anhydride) such as terephthalic acid or pthalic acid anhydride". These polyesteramides are often manufactured from regional vegetable oils including neem oil.

== See also ==
- Polyester
- Polyamide
- Self healing material
