= N,N-Diethylmethylamine =

Organic compound, industrial chemical

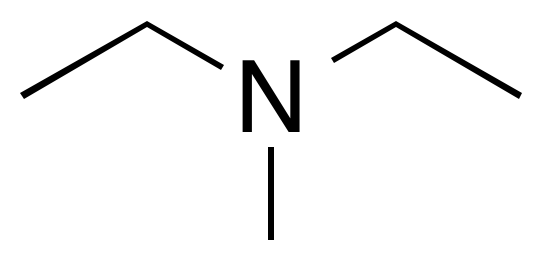

Names
- Preferred IUPAC name N-Ethyl-N-methylethanamine

Identifiers
CAS Number	616-39-7
3D model (JSmol)	Interactive image
ChEMBL	ChEMBL2448813
ChemSpider	11527
ECHA InfoCard	100.009.528
EC Number	210-480-5
PubChem CID	12022
UNII	2Y6BJW3KUD
CompTox Dashboard (EPA)	DTXSID401064045, DTXSID901024303 DTXSID8060664, DTXSID401064045, DTXSID901024303
- InChI: InChI=1S/C5H13N/c1-4-6(3)5-2/h4-5H2,1-3H3 Key: GNVRJGIVDSQCOP-UHFFFAOYSA-N
- SMILES: CCN(C)CC

Properties
Chemical formula	C_{5}H_{13}N
Molar mass	87.166 g·mol^{−1}
Appearance	Volatile liquid at room temp.
Density	0.72 g/mL
Melting point	−196.0 °C (−320.8 °F; 77.1 K)
Boiling point	66.0 °C (150.8 °F; 339.1 K)
Solubility in water	310.5 g/L
Acidity (pK_{a})	10.35 (for the conjugate acid) (H_{2}O)

Hazards
- Occupational safety and health (OHS/OSH)
Main hazards	acute toxicity
- GHS labelling
Pictograms	(GHS02: Flammable) (GHS05: Corrosive) (GHS06: Toxic) (GHS07: Exclamation mark)
Signal word	Danger
Hazard statements	H225, H301, H314, H332
Precautionary statements	P210, P233, P240, P241, P242, P243, P260, P264, P270, P271, P280, P301+P310, P301+P330+P331, P303+P361+P353, P304+P312, P304+P340, P305+P351+P338, P310, P312, P321, P330, P363, P370+P378, P403+P235, P405, P501
Flash point	−24 °C; −11 °F; 249 K
- Except where otherwise noted, data are given for materials in their standard state (at 25 °C [77 °F], 100 kPa). Infobox references

N,N-Diethylmethylamine (diethylmethylamine, DEMA) is a tertiary amine with the formula C_{5}H_{13}N. N,N-Diethylmethylamine is a clear, colorless to pale yellow liquid at room temperature, and is used in various industrial and scientific applications including water desalination as well as analytical and organic chemistry.

Diethylmethylamine is an acute oral and inhalation toxin although limits determining acute and chronic toxicity have not been determined, nor have the acute or chronic effects on various organ systems. Additionally, the effects of environmental exposure or accumulation are not currently known.

DEMA can be nitrosated to its corresponding nitrosamine which may present health considerations if DEMA is used in an industrial process that involves nitrating agents at low pH or high temperatures. The nitrosamine N-nitrosodiethylamine has been found in cosmetics and is a possible product of DEMA nitrosation. However, this toxic nitrosamine has only rarely been identified in cosmetic products. There are no specific storage requirements for DEMA, other than the usual precautions for storing a flammable liquid.

== Preparation ==
Diethylmethylamine can be produced by reductive amination of the secondary amine N,N-diethylamine, in particular under Eschweiler-Clarke conditions, or by the catalyzed reaction between ethylamine and methanol. A 1960 patent reports the synthesis of DEMA using methyl toluate and diethylamine, but low yields and difficult reaction conditions make this approach infeasible for most synthetic applications.

== Properties ==
=== Molecular structure and conformation ===
The methylene carbon-nitrogen sigma bonds in DEMA allow for multiple molecular conformations to exist, which has been studied by Bushweller et al. and, more recently, Takeuchi et al. These studies demonstrated the existence of four major conformers, with the trans-trans conformer possessing the greatest stability. Additional conformers were shown to exist, but represent a non-significant percentage of the conformer population at any given time and were only observed at low temperatures. Finally, pyramidal inversion at the nitrogen atom occurs, as shown by decoelescence of the N-CH_{2} resonance in NMR samples that were taken at various decreasing temperatures. The data obtained in these experiments agree with data from the similar tertiary amine triethylamine, leading the authors to conclude that any acyclic trialkylamine with straight-chain moieties will have similar stereodynamics compared to DEMA and triethylamine.

== Usage ==
DEMA has found use in multiple fields of study including nuclear magnetic resonance spectroscopy (NMR), industrial extraction techniques, and water desalination.

=== Lineshape standard of nuclear magnetic resonance experiment ===
For a ^{13}C NMR experiment, peak shape and instrument sensitivity are important considerations, and these can be optimized by adjusting the magnetic shims to enhance the magnetic field homogeneity and optimize peak shape. Samples used to optimize peak shape often fail at low temperatures due to peak broadening. However, DEMA has been shown to be a useful lineshape standard at temperatures down to 140K, due to its low melting point of 130K and liquid state at standard temperature and pressure.

=== Extraction of tar sands with microemulsions ===
Tar sands are an important source of bitumen, which is extracted using water-surfactant mixtures. Typical surfactants include alcohols, alkaline agents, and short-chain polymers. DEMA has been demonstrated to be a more effective cosurfactant in water compared to alcohol. Experimental results indicated that a monophasic region increase is observed when DEMA is used as a cosurfactant compared to butanol. The results also indicated DEMA reacts as medium-chain-length alcohol, which has both good hydrophilic-hydrophobic balance and high solubility in water and many types of oil.

=== Extractive crystallization ===
Extractive crystallization is a method of salt removal from aqueous solutions without requiring evaporative removal of water. Coordination of water molecules with polar compounds reduces the amount of water effectively available for salt solvation, resulting in crystallization, or "crashing out", of the salt. DEMA has been used in extractive crystallization as it has similar chemical properties to the previously used diisopropylamine(DIPA), but a lower critical solution temperature of 57°C (compared to 27 °C for DIPA; the word lower indicates that the LCST is a lower bound to a temperature interval of partial miscibility, or miscibility for certain compositions only). This precluded the necessity of refrigeration, and the energy costs associated. At low temperatures (-0.5 °C), DEMAcan be used in extractive crystallization of sodium chloride; however, the percentage of sodium chloride in the organic phase is increased. The best temperature range is 5 -10 °C. In this range, the solubility of sodium chloride is relatively insensitive to temperature. DEMA can also be used in extractive crystallization of sodium sulfate at room temperature (21 - 25 °C). In this range, sodium sulfate solubility in DEMA is relatively insensitive to temperature.

== DEMA in Analytical and Bio- Chemistry ==
=== Interfacial bonding mechanisms between iron and DEMA ===
Metals expected to come into contact with corrosive media are often coated with resistant polymers. However, the interfacial bonding between the polymer and metal surface is poorly understood, which led to research investigating the interaction of amides/amines (common polymer conpoments) and iron surfaces. Results indicate a charge-transfer mechanism between nitrogen and iron atoms. Compounds containing hydroxyl and carbonyl moieties were better substrates for iron adhesion compared to DEMA, suggesting that increased polarity is crucial for good polymer adhesion.

=== DEMA effects in protic ionic liquids ===
Protic ionic liquids (PILs) are ionic liquids formed by proton transfer from a Brønsted acid to a Brønsted base. in two PILs formed using DEMA as the parent amine, the addition of DEMA can have contrasting effects based on the reaction occurring on an electrode surface. During the reduction of trifluoromethanesulfonic acid (TfOH), DEMA absorbs on the electrode surface, decreasing reaction kinetics. Conversely, formic acid oxidation is increased in the same system, due to the formation of active formate ions. The authors conclude that "parent amines, if present in ammonium-based PILs, can inhibit or enhance electrocatalytic reactions, depending on the reaction under study, while completely different behaviour can result from changing the structure of the PIL anions."

=== Enzyme kinetic studies involving DEMA ===
Trimethylamine dehydrogenase catalyzes the oxidative demethylation of trimethylamine (TMA) and produces dimethylamine, formaldehyde, and a reduced electron-transferring flavoprotein. Substrate studies on this enzyme utilized DEMA, since the kinetics involving this unnatural substrate are slow enough to allow for detailed analysis. Three distinct kinetic phases were observed, corresponding to oxidation of a flavin mononucleotide, breakdown of the flavin-substrate adduct, and product dissociation and intramolecular electron transfer.
