= Pseurotin A =

Names
- Preferred IUPAC name (5S,8S,9R)-8-Benzoyl-2-[(1S,2S,3Z)-1,2-dihydroxyhex-3-en-1-yl]-9-hydroxy-8-methoxy-3-methyl-1-oxa-7-azaspiro[4.4]non-2-ene-4,6-dione

Identifiers
CAS Number	58523-30-1
3D model (JSmol)	Interactive image
ChEBI	CHEBI:64535
ChEMBL	ChEMBL253179
ChemSpider	8021336
PubChem CID	9845622
UNII	H73C5W8FNE
CompTox Dashboard (EPA)	DTXSID901017601
- InChI: InChI=1S/C22H25NO8/c1-4-5-11-14(24)15(25)16-12(2)17(26)21(31-16)19(28)22(30-3,23-20(21)29)18(27)13-9-7-6-8-10-13/h5-11,14-15,19,24-25,28H,4H2,1-3H3,(H,23,29)/b11-5-/t14-,15-,19+,21+,22+/m0/s1 Key: SLYDIPAXCVVRNY-UOWMTANKSA-N
- SMILES: CC/C=C\[C@@H]([C@@H](C1=C(C(=O)[C@@]2(O1)[C@H]([C@@](NC2=O)(C(=O)C3=CC=CC=C3)OC)O)C)O)O

Properties
Chemical formula	C_{22}H_{25}NO_{8}
Molar mass	431.441 g·mol^{−1}
- Except where otherwise noted, data are given for materials in their standard state (at 25 °C [77 °F], 100 kPa). Infobox references

Pseurotin A is a secondary metabolite of Aspergillus.

== Biosynthesis ==
The gene cluster responsible for the biosynthesis of Pseurotin A was predicted by deletion and overexpression of polyketide synthase nonribosomal peptide synthetase hybrid enzyme gene, PsoA. While it is unknown how the azaspirocyclic core of the pseurotin family of natural products is made, the post polyketide synthase modifications are known. In-vivo and in-vitro studies showed the unique mechanism involved in the modification enzymes PsoC, PsoD, PsoE, and PsoF. PsoD codes for a cytochrome P450, which is responsible for oxidizing the benzyl carbon (C17) to the conjugated ketone. PsoC codes for a methyltransferase, which methylates the tertiary alcohol closest to the benzoyl moiety on C8. PsoE is predicted to be a glutathione S-transferase gene, and isomerizes the C=C bond furthest down the tail from the E stereoisomer to the Z stereoisomer. PsoF is unique in that its gene is encoded separate from the pseurotin gene cluster and is responsible for the epoxidation of the trans double bond that remains in the tail. This epoxide is spontaneously hydrolyzed by either an SN2 mechanism to form pseurotin A, or by an SN2’ mechanism to form pseurotin D.

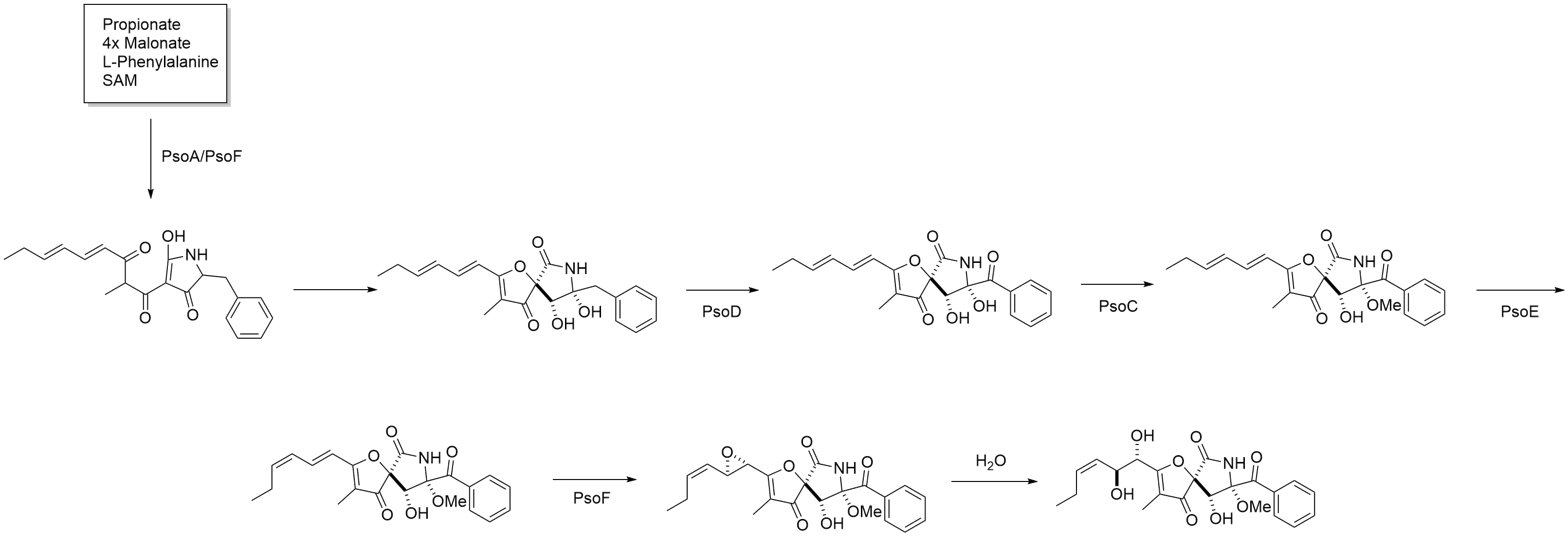

== See also ==
- 14-Norpseurotin A
