= Piperidinone =

Piperidinones or piperidones are a class of chemical compounds sharing the piperidone skeleton. A classic named reaction for the synthesis of piperidones is the Petrenko-Kritschenko piperidone synthesis which involves combining an alkyl-1,3-acetonedicarboxylate with benzaldehyde and an amine. This multicomponent reaction is related to the Hantzsch pyridine synthesis.

== Piperidinones ==
- 2-Piperidinone
- 3-Piperidinone
- 4-Piperidinone
