= Neopentylamine =

Chemical compound

Names
- IUPAC name 2,2-dimethylpropan-1-amine

Identifiers
CAS Number	5813-64-9
3D model (JSmol)	Interactive image
ChemSpider	72173
ECHA InfoCard	100.024.890
EC Number	227-378-1
PubChem CID	79882
UNII	988C7435J3
CompTox Dashboard (EPA)	DTXSID4022232
- InChI: InChI=1S/C5H13N/c1-5(2,3)4-6/h4,6H2,1-3H3 Key: XDIAMRVROCPPBK-UHFFFAOYSA-N
- SMILES: CC(C)(C)CN

Properties
Chemical formula	C_{5}H_{13}N
Molar mass	87.166 g·mol^{−1}
Appearance	colorless liquid
Density	0.74 g/cm^{3}
Melting point	−70 °C (−94 °F; 203 K)
Boiling point	80–82 °C (176–180 °F; 353–355 K)

Hazards
- Occupational safety and health (OHS/OSH)
Main hazards	Irritant, Flammable, Corrosive
- GHS labelling
Pictograms	(GHS02: Flammable) (GHS05: Corrosive) (GHS07: Exclamation mark)
Signal word	Danger
Hazard statements	H225, H302, H314
Precautionary statements	P210, P233, P240, P241, P242, P243, P260, P264, P270, P280, P301+P312, P301+P330+P331, P303+P361+P353, P304+P340, P305+P351+P338, P310, P321, P330, P363, P370+P378, P403+P235, P405, P501
Flash point	-13
- Except where otherwise noted, data are given for materials in their standard state (at 25 °C [77 °F], 100 kPa). (what is ?) Infobox references

Neopentylamine is an organic compound with the molecular formula (CH_{3})_{3}CCH_{2}NH_{2}. It is a colorless liquid. The molecule is the primary amine derivative of neopentane, (CH_{3})_{4}C.

Like most alkyl amines, it degrades slowly in air.

== Synthesis ==
Neopentylamine is prepared by the reaction of neopentyl alcohol with ammonia in the presence of a hydrogenation catalyst.

== Use ==
It is a common building block. For example, some experimental drugs incorporate this amine.
