= 3-Aminopentane =

- Structural formula

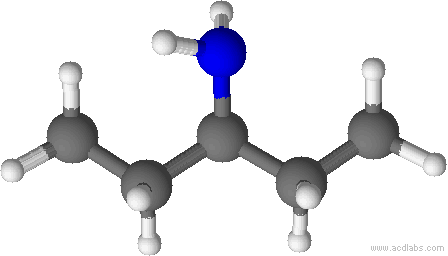
- Ball and stick model

Names
- Preferred IUPAC name Pentan-3-amine

Identifiers
CAS Number	616-24-0
3D model (JSmol)	Interactive image
Abbreviations	3-AB
ChEBI	CHEBI:84248
ChEMBL	ChEMBL14178
ChemSpider	11524
ECHA InfoCard	100.009.520
EC Number	210-471-6
PubChem CID	12019
UNII	3N2IT605HV
CompTox Dashboard (EPA)	DTXSID8060662
- InChI: InChI=1S/C5H13N/c1-3-5(6)4-2/h5H,3-4,6H2,1-2H3 Key: PQPFFKCJENSZKL-UHFFFAOYSA-N
- SMILES: CCC(CC)N

Properties
Chemical formula	C_{5}H_{13}N
Molar mass	87.166 g·mol^{−1}
Appearance	Colorless liquid
Density	0.7479 g/cm^{3}
Boiling point	89 °C (192 °F; 362 K)

Hazards
- GHS labelling
Pictograms	(GHS02: Flammable) (GHS05: Corrosive)
Signal word	Danger
Hazard statements	H225, H314
Precautionary statements	P210, P233, P240, P241, P242, P243, P260, P264, P280, P301+P330+P331, P303+P361+P353, P304+P340, P305+P351+P338, P310, P321, P363, P370+P378, P403+P235, P405, P501
- Except where otherwise noted, data are given for materials in their standard state (at 25 °C [77 °F], 100 kPa). Infobox references

3-Aminopentane is the organic compound with the formula (CH_{3}CH_{2})_{2}CHNH_{2}. It is a colorless liquid. It is of interest for producing soluble imides and imines without introducing a chiral center.

== Safety ==
The LD_{50} (rat, oral or dermal) for primary alkylamines is 100-1 mg/kg.

== See also ==
- 1-Aminopentane
