= Pentylamine =

- Skeletal formula of pentylamine

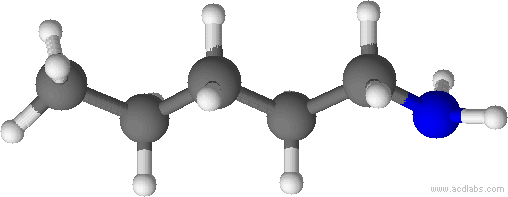
- Ball and stick model

Names
- Preferred IUPAC name Pentan-1-amine
- Other names Pentylamine

Identifiers
CAS Number	110-58-7
3D model (JSmol)	Interactive image
Abbreviations	PeNH_{2} n-PeNH_{2} nPeNH_{2}^{n}PeNH_{2}
Beilstein Reference	505953
ChEBI	CHEBI:74848
ChemSpider	7769
DrugBank	DB02045
ECHA InfoCard	100.003.438
EC Number	203-780-2
MeSH	n-amylamine
PubChem CID	8060
RTECS number	SC0300000
UNII	E05QM3V8EF
UN number	1106
CompTox Dashboard (EPA)	DTXSID0021919
- InChI: InChI=1S/C5H13N/c1-2-3-4-5-6/h2-6H2,1H3 Key: DPBLXKKOBLCELK-UHFFFAOYSA-N
- SMILES: CCCCCN

Properties
Chemical formula	C_{5}H_{13}N
Molar mass	87.166 g·mol^{−1}
Appearance	Colourless liquid
Density	0.752 g mL^{−1}
Melting point	−55 °C; −67 °F; 218 K
Boiling point	94 to 110 °C; 201 to 230 °F; 367 to 383 K
Solubility in water	Miscible
Henry's law constant (k_{H})	410 μmol Pa^{−1} kg^{−1}
Magnetic susceptibility (χ)	−69.4·10^{−6} cm^{3}/mol
Refractive index (n_{D})	1.411

Thermochemistry
Heat capacity (C)	218 J K^{−1} mol^{−1} (at −75 °C)

Hazards
- GHS labelling
Pictograms	(GHS02: Flammable) (GHS05: Corrosive) (GHS06: Toxic)
Signal word	Danger
Hazard statements	H225, H302, H312, H314, H331
Precautionary statements	P210, P261, P280, P305+P351+P338, P310
Flash point	1 °C (34 °F; 274 K)
Explosive limits	2.2–22%
- Lethal dose or concentration (LD, LC)
LD_{50} (median dose)	470 mg kg^{−1} (oral, rat); 1.12 g kg^{−1} (dermal, rabbit)

Related compounds
Related alkanamines	n-Butylamine; sec-Butylamine; Putrescine; Cadaverine; Methylhexanamine; Hexamethylenediamine
Related compounds	5-Amino-1-pentanol
- Except where otherwise noted, data are given for materials in their standard state (at 25 °C [77 °F], 100 kPa). verify (what is ?) Infobox references

Pentylamine is an organic compound with the formula CH_{3}(CH_{2})_{4}NH_{2}. It is used as a solvent, as a raw material in the manufacture of a variety of other compounds, including dyes, emulsifiers, and pharmaceutical products, and as a flavoring agent.

Pentylamine exhibits reactions typical of other simple alkyl amines, i.e. protonation, alkylation, acylation, condensation with carbonyls. Like other simple aliphatic amines, pentylamine is a weak base: the pK_{a} of [CH_{3}(CH_{2})_{4}NH_{3}]^{+} is 10.21.

== See also ==
- 3-Aminopentane
