= Lactam =

Cyclic amide

From left to right, the above are general structures of β-lactam, a γ-lactam, a δ-lactam, and ε-lactam. Their common names are β-propiolactam, γ-butyrolactam, δ-valerolactam, and ε-caprolactam.

A lactam is a cyclic amide, formally derived from an amino carboxylic acid through cyclization reactions. The term is a portmanteau of the words lactone + amide.

== Nomenclature ==
Greek prefixes in alphabetical order indicate ring size.

Ring size (number of atoms in the ring)	Systematic name	IUPAC name	Common name(s)	Structure
3	α-Lactam	Aziridin-2-one	α-Acetolactam	
4	β-Lactam	Azetidin-2-one	β-Propiolactam	
5	γ-Lactam	Pyrrolidin-2-one	γ-Butyrolactam; 2-Pyrrolidone	
6	δ-Lactam	Piperidin-2-one	δ-Valerolactam; 2-Piperidinone; 2-piperidone	
7	ε-Lactam	Azepan-2-one	ε-Caprolactam; Caprolactam	

This ring-size nomenclature stems from the fact that hydrolysis of an α-lactam gives an α-amino acid and that of a β-Lactam gives a β-amino acid, and so on.

== Synthesis ==
General synthetic methods are used for the organic synthesis of lactams.

=== Beckmann rearrangement ===
Lactams form by the acid-catalyzed rearrangement of oximes in the Beckmann rearrangement.

=== Schmidt reaction ===
Lactams form from cyclic ketones and hydrazoic acid in the Schmidt reaction. Cyclohexanone with hydrazoic acid, forms ε - Caprolactam, which upon treatment with excess acid forms Cardiazole, a heart stimulant.

=== Cyclization of amino acids ===
Lactams can be formed from cyclisation of amino acids via the coupling between an amine and a carboxylic acid within the same molecule. Lactamization is most efficient in this way if the product is a γ-lactam. For example, Fmoc-Dab(Mtt)-OH, although its side-chain amine is sterically protected by extremely bulky 4-Methyltrityl (Mtt) group, the amine can still intramolecularly couple with the carboxylic acid to form a γ-lactam. This reaction almost finished within 5 minutes with many coupling reagents (e.g. HATU and PyAOP).

=== Intramolecular nucleophilic substitution ===
Lactams form from intramolecular attack of linear acyl derivatives from the nucleophilic abstraction reaction.

=== Iodolactamization ===
An iminium ion reacts with a halonium ion formed in situ by reaction of an alkene with iodine.

=== Kinugasa reaction ===
Lactams form by copper-catalyzed 1,3-dipolar cycloaddition of alkynes and nitrones in the Kinugasa reaction

=== Diels-Alder reaction ===
Diels-Alder reaction between cyclopentadiene and chlorosulfonyl isocyanate (CSI) can be utilized to obtain both β- as well as γ-lactam. At lower temp (−78 °C), β-lactam is the preferred product. At optimum temperatures, a highly useful γ-lactam known as Vince Lactam is obtained.

== Lactam–lactim tautomerism ==
A lactim is a cyclic imidic acid compound characterized by an endocyclic carbon-nitrogen double bond. They are formed when lactams undergo tautomerization.

Lactam Lactim

== Reactions ==
- Lactams can polymerize to polyamides.

== See also ==
- Lactone, a cyclic ester.
- β-Lactam
- β-Lactam antibiotics, which includes penicillins
- 2-Pyrrolidone
- 2-Piperidinone
- Caprolactam
