= 2-Piperidinone =

Names
- Preferred IUPAC name Piperidin-2-one
- Other names: δ-Valerolactam; 2-Piperidinone; 2-Piperidone

Identifiers
| CAS Number | 675-20-7 |
| 3D model (JSmol) | Interactive image |
| ChEBI | CHEBI:77761 |
| ChemSpider | 12144 |
| ECHA InfoCard | 100.010.567 |
| PubChem CID | 12665 |
| UNII | WLN0GQQ6EK |
| CompTox Dashboard (EPA) | DTXSID1060976 |
- InChI: InChI=1S/C5H9NO/c7-5-3-1-2-4-6-5/h1-4H2,(H,6,7) Key: XUWHAWMETYGRKB-UHFFFAOYSA-N; InChI=1/C5H9NO/c7-5-3-1-2-4-6-5/h1-4H2,(H,6,7) Key: XUWHAWMETYGRKB-UHFFFAOYAE
- SMILES: O=C1NCCCC1

Properties
| Chemical formula | C_{5}H_{9}NO |
| Molar mass | 99.133 g·mol^{−1} |
| Density | 1.073 g/cm^{3} |
| Melting point | 38 to 40 °C (100 to 104 °F; 311 to 313 K) |
| Boiling point | 256 °C (493 °F; 529 K) |
| Solubility in water | 291 g/L |

Hazards
| Flash point | > 110 °C (230 °F; 383 K) |
| Safety data sheet (SDS) | MSDS |

Related compounds
| Related compounds | 4-Piperidinone |
- Except where otherwise noted, data are given for materials in their standard state (at 25 °C [77 °F], 100 kPa). Infobox references

2-Piperidinone (2-piperidone or δ-valerolactam) is an organic compound with the formula (CH_{2})_{4}CONH. Valerolactam is formed by dehydrogenation of 5-amino-1-pentanol, catalyzed by rhodium and ruthenium complexes, The compound, a colorless solid, is classified as a lactam.

It is the monomer of nylon 5, a polyamide:

n (CH_{2})_{4}CONH → [HN(CH_{2})_{4}CO)]_{n}
