= Remifentanilic acid =

Inactive metabolite of remifentanil

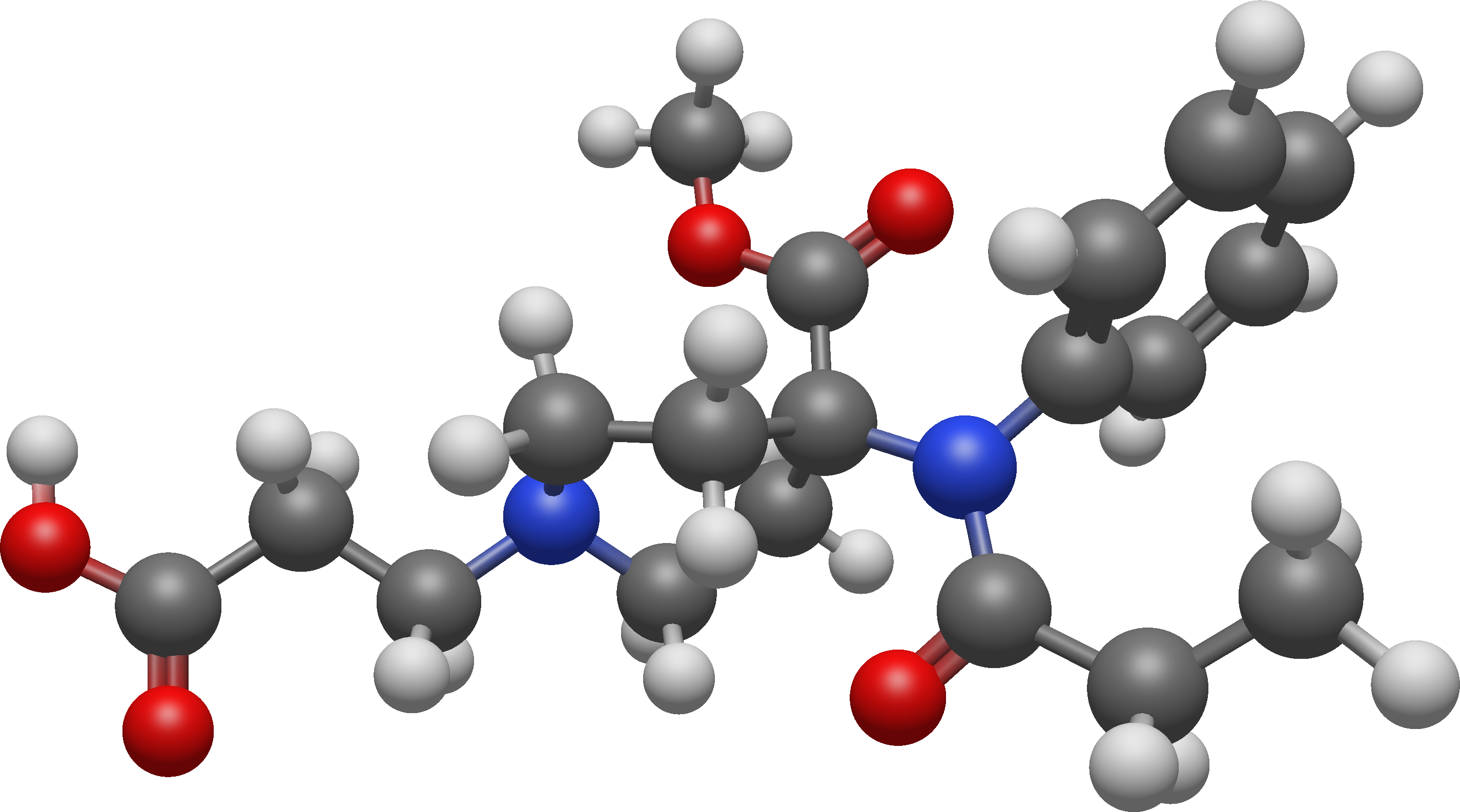

Identifiers
- IUPAC name: 3-[4-methoxycarbonyl-4-(N-propanoylanilino)piperidin-1-yl]propanoic acid
- CAS Number: 132875-68-4
- PubChem CID: 131560
- UNII: E1EZX4S2E1

Chemical and physical data
- Formula: C_{19}H_{26}N_{2}O_{5}
- Molar mass: 362.426 g·mol^{−1}
- 3D model (JSmol): Interactive image
- SMILES: CCC(=O)N(C1=CC=CC=C1)C2(CCN(CC2)CCC(=O)O)C(=O)OC
- InChI: InChI=1S/C19H26N2O5/c1-3-16(22)21(15-7-5-4-6-8-15)19(18(25)26-2)10-13-20(14-11-19)12-9-17(23)24/h4-8H,3,9-14H2,1-2H3,(H,23,24); Key:GFJKFSFFMHOISI-UHFFFAOYSA-N

Remifentanilic acid is a metabolite of the potent short-acting synthetic opioid analgesic drug remifentanil. It is an analog of fentanyl and remifentanil, but is not active as an opioid in its own right.

== See also ==
- 3-Methylbutyrfentanyl
- 4-Fluorobutyrfentanyl
- 4-Fluorofentanyl
- α-Methylfentanyl
- Acetylfentanyl
- Benzylfentanyl
- Furanylfentanyl
- Homofentanyl
- List of fentanyl analogues
