= Butyrylnorfentanyl =

Synthetic opioid analgesic metabolite

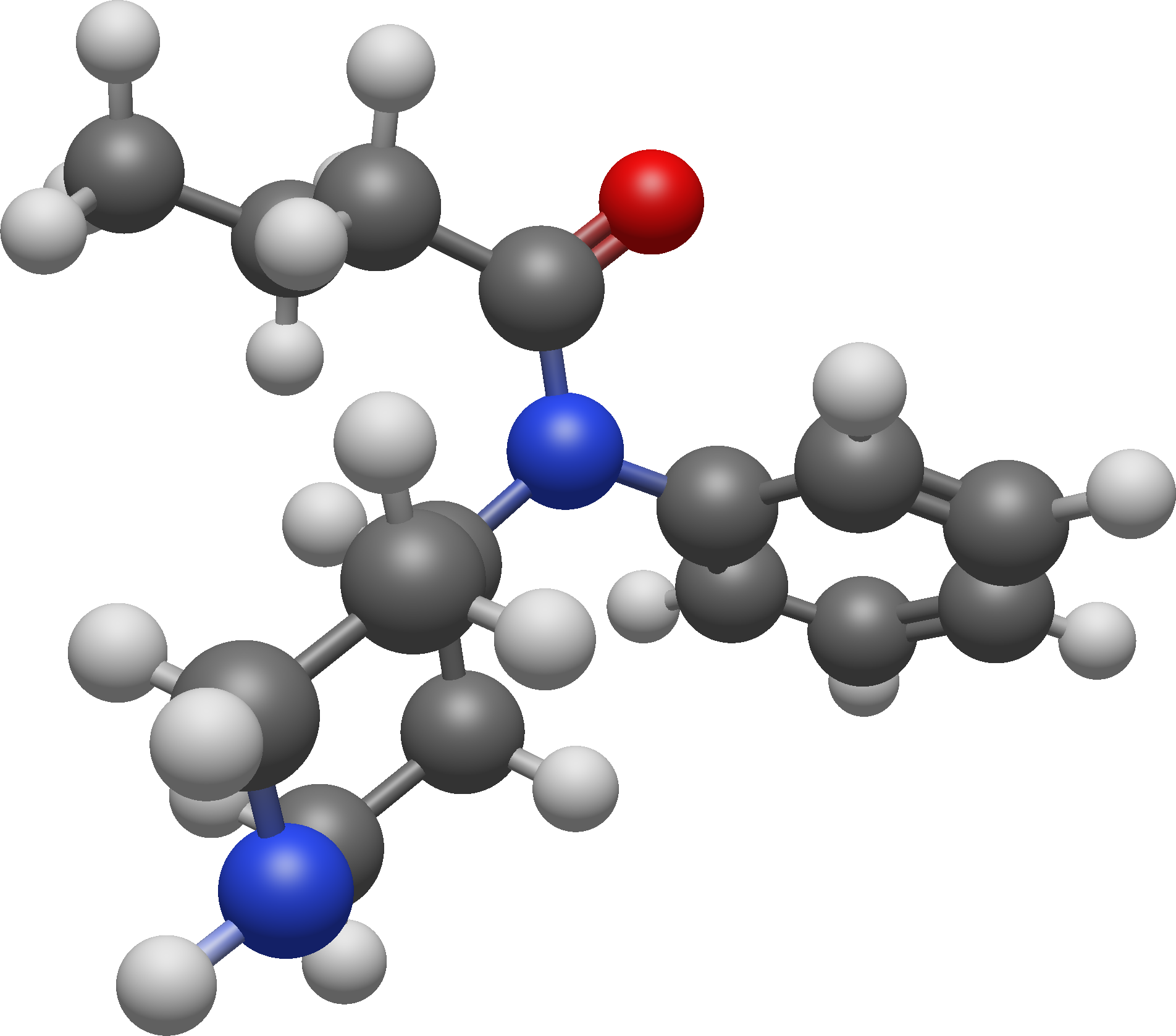

Identifiers
- IUPAC name: N-phenyl-N-4-piperidinyl-butanamide,
- CAS Number: 1432-03-7
- PubChem CID: 10658099
- ChemSpider: 3442746
- UNII: CU9QW4M753
- CompTox Dashboard (EPA): DTXSID901341991

Chemical and physical data
- Formula: C_{15}H_{22}N_{2}O
- Molar mass: 246.354 g·mol^{−1}
- 3D model (JSmol): Interactive image
- SMILES: O=C(N(C1=CC=CC=C1)C2CCNCC2)CCC
- InChI: InChI=1S/C15H22N2O.ClH/c1-2-6-15(18)17(13-7-4-3-5-8-13)14-9-11-16-12-10-14;/h3-5,7-8,14,16H,2,6,9-12H2,1H3;1H; Key:VVVKOVYWEOKXGV-UHFFFAOYSA-N

Butyrnorfentanyl or butyrylnorfentanyl is an inactive synthetic opioid analgesic drug precursor. It is an analog of fentanyl.

== See also ==
- 3-Methylbutyrfentanyl
- 4-Fluorobutyrfentanyl
- 4-Fluorofentanyl
- α-Methylfentanyl
- Acetylfentanyl
- Benzylfentanyl
- Furanylfentanyl
- Homofentanyl
- List of fentanyl analogues
