= Despropionyl-p-fluorofentanyl =

Synthetic opioid analgesic precursor

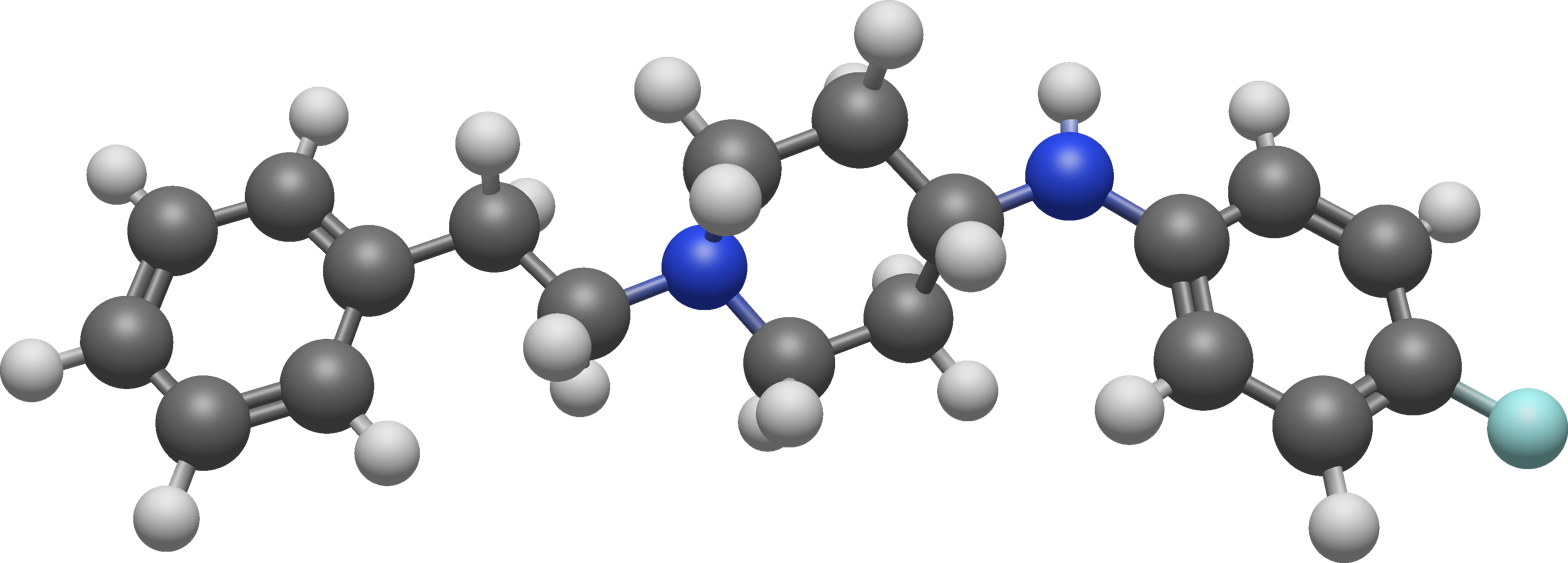

Identifiers
- IUPAC name: N-phenyl-N-4-piperidinyl-butanamide,
- CAS Number: 122861-41-0
- PubChem CID: 21812144
- ChemSpider: 10551386
- UNII: R8ZH1EQ95Y
- CompTox Dashboard (EPA): DTXSID10618291

Chemical and physical data
- Formula: C_{19}H_{23}FN_{2}O_{0}
- Molar mass: 298.405 g·mol^{−1}
- 3D model (JSmol): Interactive image
- SMILES: Fc3ccc(NC2CCN(CCc1ccccc1)CC2)cc3
- InChI: InChI=1S/C19H23FN2/c20-17-6-8-18(9-7-17)21-19-11-14-22(15-12-19)13-10-16-4-2-1-3-5-16/h1-9,19,21H,10-15H2; Key:WWDHLOLWLHHFBH-UHFFFAOYSA-N

Despropionyl-p-fluorofentanyl is an inactive synthetic opioid analgesic drug precursor to 4-fluorofentanyl. It is an analog of fentanyl.

== See also ==
- 3-Methylbutyrfentanyl
- 4-Fluorobutyrfentanyl
- 4-Fluorofentanyl
- α-Methylfentanyl
- Acetylfentanyl
- Benzylfentanyl
- Furanylfentanyl
- Homofentanyl
- List of fentanyl analogues
