= Furanyl norfentanyl =

Synthetic opioid analgesic metabolite

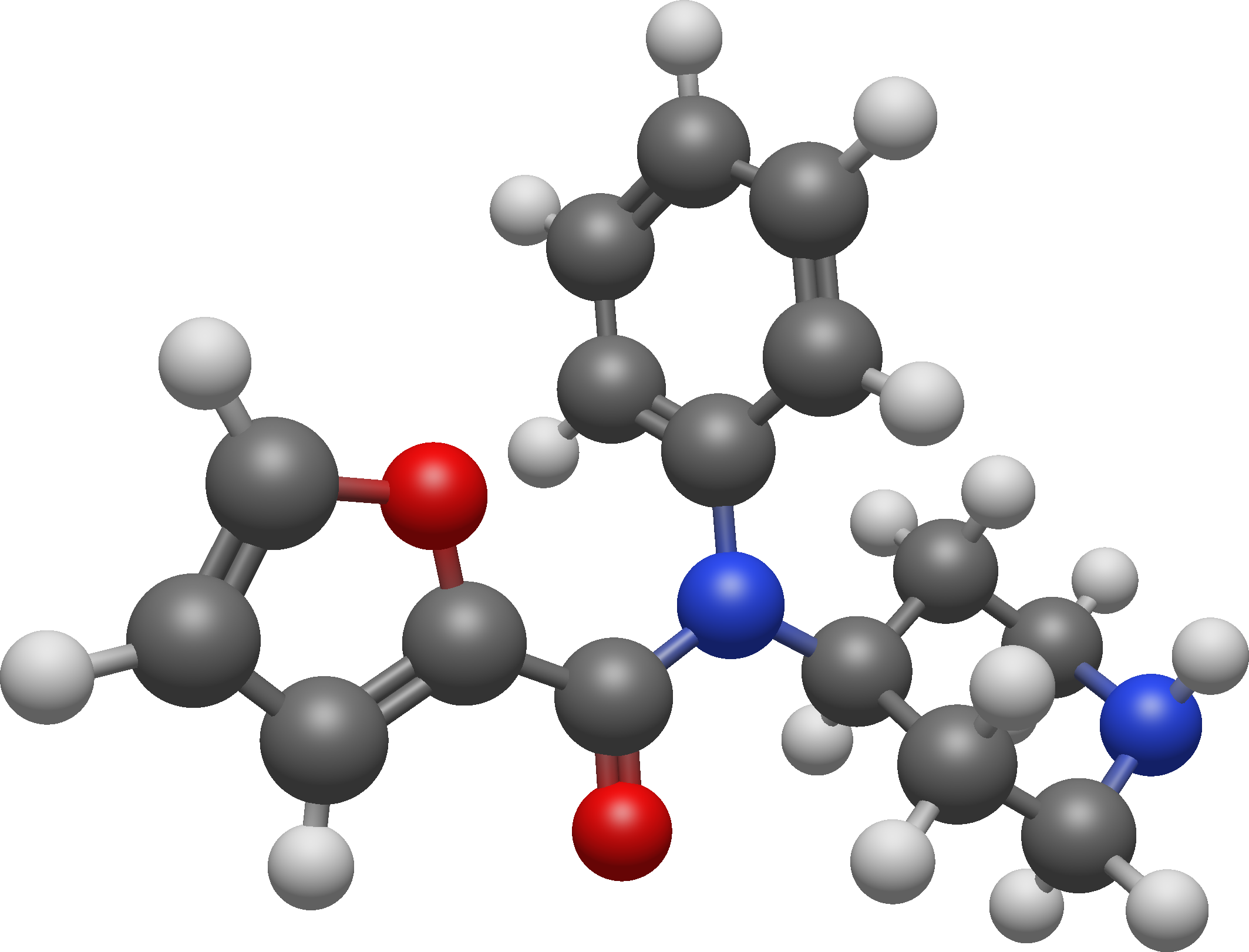

Identifiers
- IUPAC name: N-phenyl-N-4-piperidinyl-2-furancarboxamide
- CAS Number: 1047187-49-4
- PubChem CID: 46744107
- ChemSpider: 22716363
- UNII: Y28CQJ6ZB9
- CompTox Dashboard (EPA): DTXSID201342136

Chemical and physical data
- Formula: C_{16}H_{18}F_{0}N_{2}O_{2}
- Molar mass: 270.332 g·mol^{−1}
- 3D model (JSmol): Interactive image
- SMILES: O=C(C1=CC=CO1)N(C2CCNCC2)C3=CC=CC=C3
- InChI: InChI=1S/C16H18N2O2.ClH/c19-16(15-7-4-12-20-15)18(13-5-2-1-3-6-13)14-8-10-17-11-9-14;/h1-7,12,14,17H,8-11H2;1H; Key:CTLGGGXGCVGIOQ-UHFFFAOYSA-N

Furanylnorfentanyl is an inactive synthetic opioid analgesic drug precursor. It is an analog of fentanyl.

== See also ==
- 3-Methylbutyrfentanyl
- 4-Fluorobutyrfentanyl
- 4-Fluorofentanyl
- α-Methylfentanyl
- Acetylfentanyl
- Benzylfentanyl
- Furanylfentanyl
- Homofentanyl
- List of fentanyl analogues
