= P-Methoxyfentanyl =

Synthetic opioid analgesic

p-Methoxyfentanyl

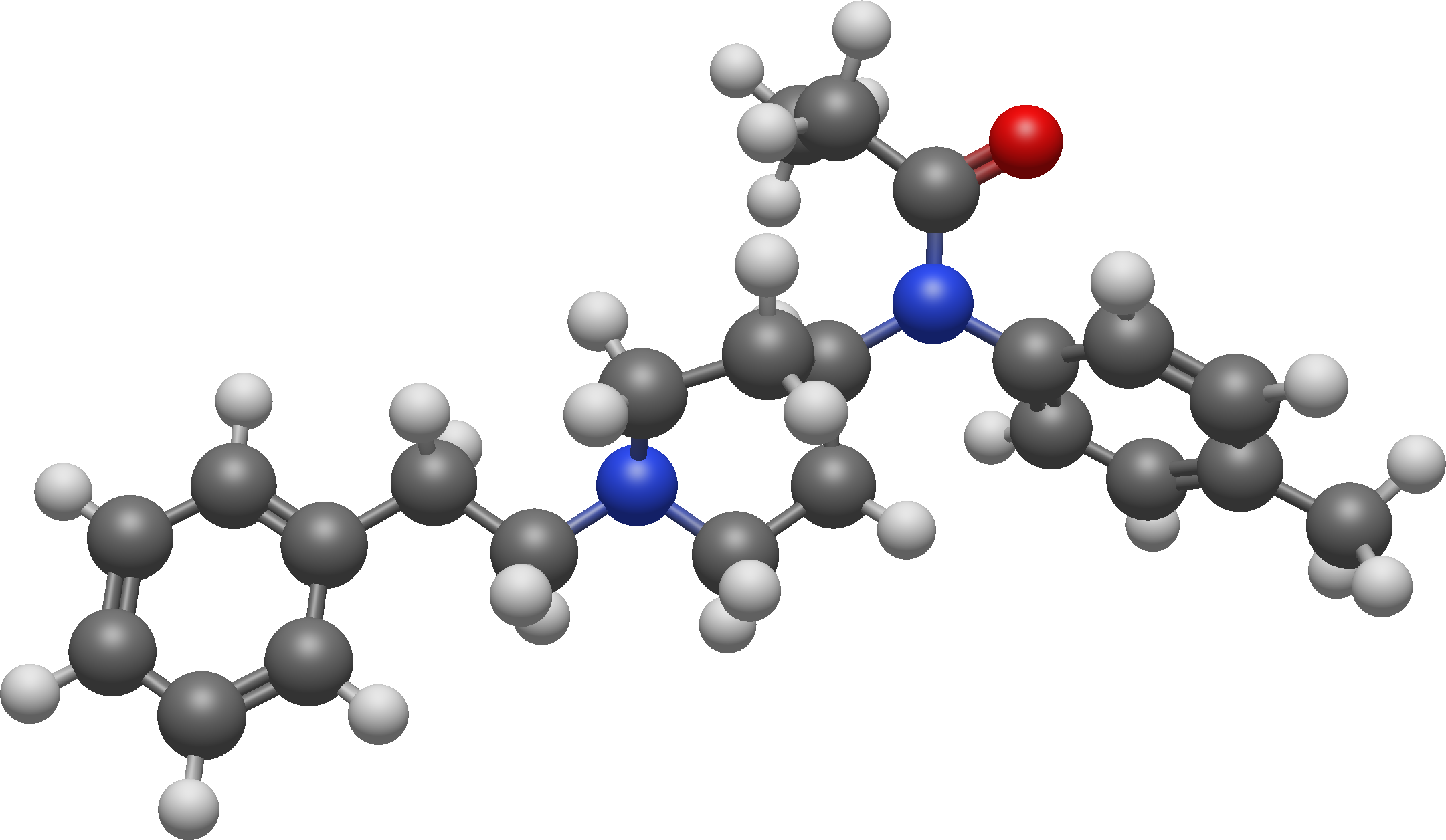

Identifiers
- IUPAC name: N-(4-Methoxyphenyl)-N-[1-(2-phenylethyl)piperidin-4-yl]propanamide
- CAS Number: 1688-41-1
- PubChem CID: 527012
- UNII: L9MX8N0TEF
- ChEBI: CHEBI:233771

Chemical and physical data
- Formula: C_{23}H_{30}N_{2}O_{2}
- Molar mass: 366.505 g·mol^{−1}
- 3D model (JSmol): Interactive image
- SMILES: CCC(=O)N(C1CCN(CC1)CCC2=CC=CC=C2)C3=CC=C(C=C3)OC
- InChI: InChI=1S/C23H30N2O2/c1-3-23(26)25(20-9-11-22(27-2)12-10-20)21-14-17-24(18-15-21)16-13-19-7-5-4-6-8-19/h4-12,21H,3,13-18H2,1-2H3; Key:QKQAUPIOVFHVJI-UHFFFAOYSA-N

para-Methoxyfentanyl or p-methoxyfentanyl or 4-methoxyfentanyl is a potent short-acting synthetic opioid analgesic drug. It is an analog of fentanyl, with similar effects but slightly lower potency.

== See also ==
- 3-Methylbutyrfentanyl
- 4-Fluorobutyrfentanyl
- 4-Fluorofentanyl
- α-Methylfentanyl
- Acetylfentanyl
- Benzylfentanyl
- Furanylfentanyl
- Homofentanyl
- List of fentanyl analogues
