= Fluorofentanyl =

Fluorofentanyl may refer to:

- Parafluorofentanyl (p-fluorofentanyl), fluorination on the aniline phenyl ring
- NFEPP (3-fluorofentanyl), fluorination on the piperidine ring
- Orthofluorofentanyl (o-fluorofentanyl), fluorination on the aniline phenyl ring
