= 1-Boc-4-AP =

Chemical compound

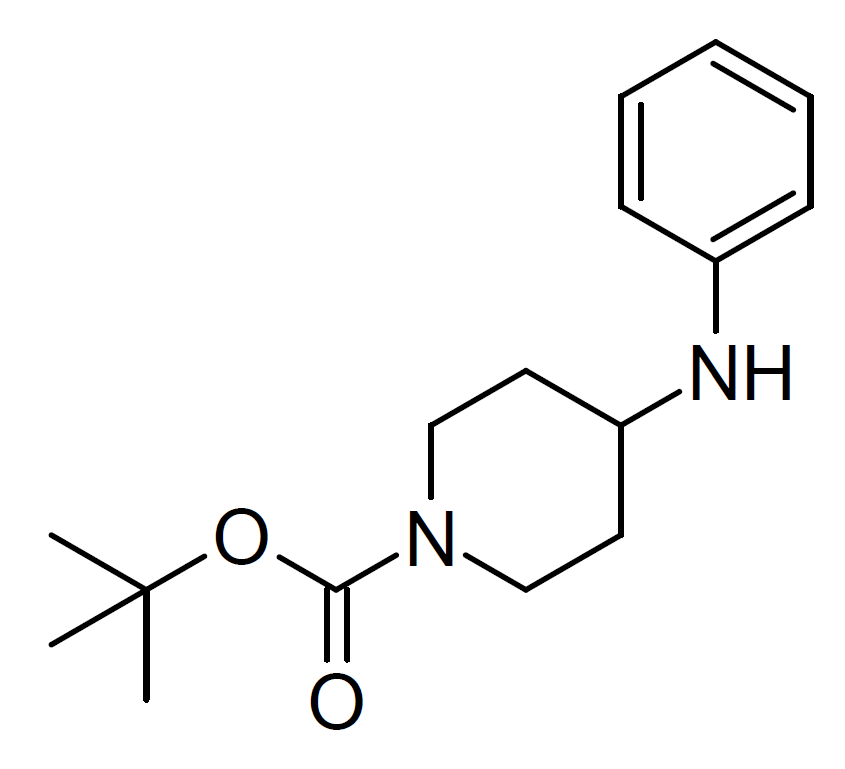

Legal status
- Legal status: US: List 1

Identifiers
- IUPAC name: tert-butyl 4-anilinopiperidine-1-carboxylate
- CAS Number: 125541-22-2
- PubChem CID: 1491502
- ChemSpider: 1231607
- UNII: 5PB6P54SRS
- ChEMBL: ChEMBL1574621
- CompTox Dashboard (EPA): DTXSID90363439

Chemical and physical data
- Formula: C_{16}H_{24}N_{2}O_{2}
- Molar mass: 276.380 g·mol^{−1}
- 3D model (JSmol): Interactive image
- SMILES: CC(C)(C)OC(=O)N1CCC(CC1)NC2=CC=CC=C2
- InChI: InChI=1S/C16H24N2O2/c1-16(2,3)20-15(19)18-11-9-14(10-12-18)17-13-7-5-4-6-8-13/h4-8,14,17H,9-12H2,1-3H3; Key:HTIWISWAPVQGMI-UHFFFAOYSA-N

1-Boc-4-AP (tert-butyl 4-(phenylamino)piperidine-1-carboxylate) is a compound used as an intermediate in the manufacture of fentanyl, as well as various related derivatives such as butyrylfentanyl, furanylfentanyl, benzylfentanyl and homofentanyl, among others. It is an N-protected derivative of 4-anilinopiperidine which can be readily converted to fentanyl or related analogues in several straightforward synthetic steps. It was classified as a DEA List 1 Chemical in 2022, and is also controlled in various other jurisdictions. Its possession, sale and importation are consequently heavily regulated throughout much of the world. 1-Boc-4-AP has also been identified as an impurity in other designer drug products, though it is unclear if it has any pharmacological activity in its own right.

== See also ==
- 4-ANPP
- 4-Piperidone
- N-Phenethyl-4-piperidinone
- N-t-BOC-MDMA
- 1-(2-Chloro-N-methylbenzimidoyl)cyclopentanol
