= C22H27FN2O =

The molecular formula C_{22}H_{27}FN_{2}O (molar mass: 354.46 g/mol) may refer to:

- NFEPP
- Orthofluorofentanyl
- Parafluorofentanyl (4-Fluorofentanyl)
