= C22H28N2O =

The molecular formula C_{22}H_{28}N_{2}O (molar mass: 336.479 g/mol) may refer to:

- Fentanyl
- Isofentanyl, or 3-methyl-benzylfentanyl
- α-Methylacetylfentanyl
- 4-Methylphenethylacetylfentanyl
