= 4-ANPP =

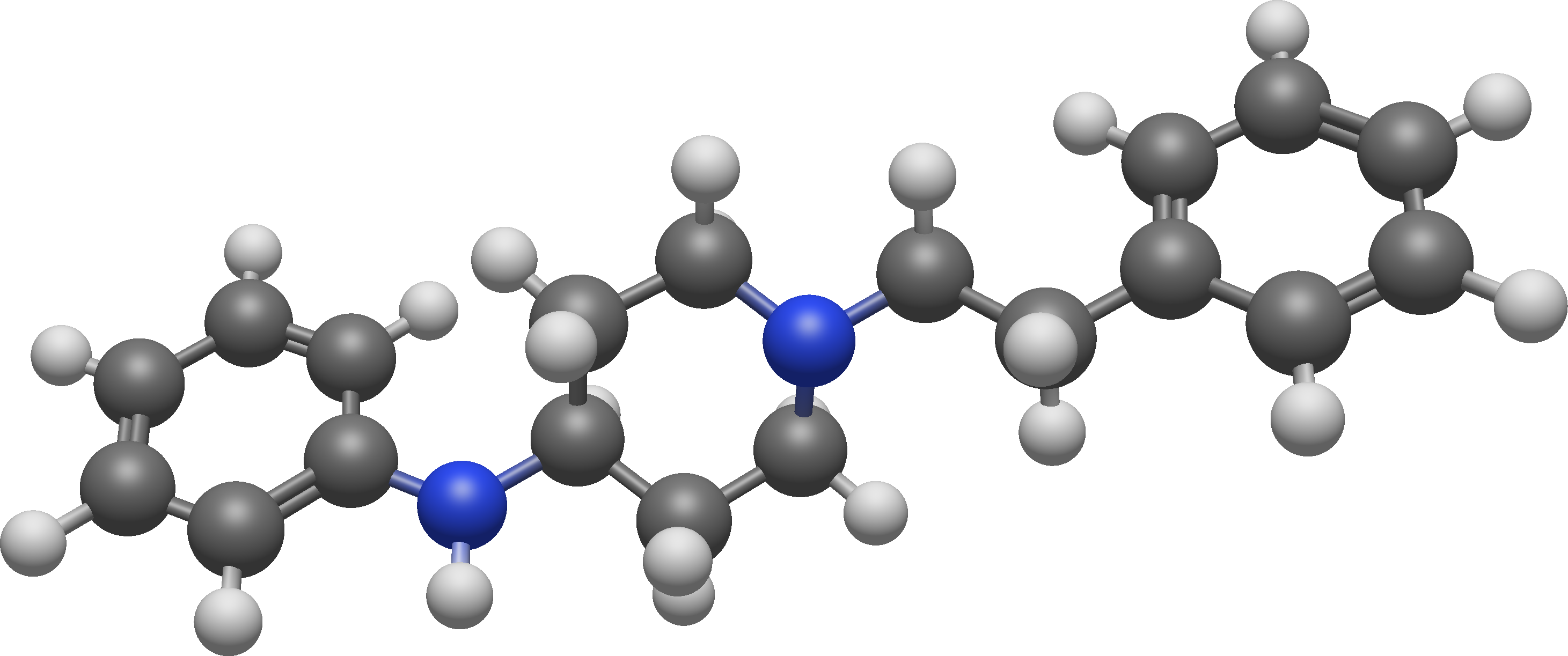

Names
- Preferred IUPAC name N-Phenyl-1-(2-phenylethyl)piperidin-4-amine
- Other names desproprionyl fentanyl; 4-anilino-N-phenethylpiperidine; 4-ANPP; ANPP

Identifiers
CAS Number	21409-26-7
3D model (JSmol)	Interactive image
Abbreviations	ANPP
ChemSpider	87058
ECHA InfoCard	100.169.974
EC Number	642-161-5
PubChem CID	88890
UNII	Q88EHD0U8G
CompTox Dashboard (EPA)	DTXSID40175680
- InChI: InChI=1S/C19H24N2/c1-3-7-17(8-4-1)11-14-21-15-12-19(13-16-21)20-18-9-5-2-6-10-18/h1-10,19-20H,11-16H2 Key: ZCMDXDQUYIWEKB-UHFFFAOYSA-N
- SMILES: C1CN(CCC1NC2=CC=CC=C2)CCC3=CC=CC=C3

Properties
Chemical formula	C_{19}H_{24}N_{2}
Molar mass	280.415 g·mol^{−1}
Legal status	AU: S9 (Prohibited substance); BR: Class D1 (Drug precursors); CA: Schedule I; UK: Scheduled Precursor; US: Schedule II; UN: International Red List
- Except where otherwise noted, data are given for materials in their standard state (at 25 °C [77 °F], 100 kPa). Infobox references

4-ANPP, also known as 4-anilino-N-phenethylpiperidine (4-ANPP), 4-aminophenyl-1-phenethylpiperidine, or despropionyl fentanyl, is a direct precursor to fentanyl and acetylfentanyl. It is commonly found as a contaminant in samples of drugs containing fentanyl, which may include samples represented by the supplier as heroin or other opioids. It is not psychoactive and is present only as a result of improper chemical purification. 4-ANPP is useful in the synthesis of pharmaceuticals, primarily fentanyl and related analogs. Paul Janssen (founder of Janssen Pharmaceutica) first synthesized fentanyl in 1960 using a similar method, with benzylfentanyl as an intermediate. The following synthesis, developed by an individual under the pseudonym of Siegfried, involves the reductive amination of N-phenethyl-4-piperidinone (NPP) with aniline to make to 4-ANPP. This product is reacted with propionyl chloride or acetyl chloride to form either fentanyl or acetylfentanyl.

== See also ==
- 1-Boc-4-AP
