= C21H26N2O =

The molecular formula C_{21}H_{26}N_{2}O (molar mass: 322.452 g/mol, exact mass: 322.2045 u) may refer to:

- Acetylfentanyl
- Benzylfentanyl (R-4129)
