= Phenaridine =

Opioid analgesic

Clinical data
- ATC code: none

Legal status
- Legal status: US: Schedule I

Identifiers
- IUPAC name: N-[2,5-Dimethyl-1-(2-phenylethyl)piperidin-4-yl]-N-phenylpropanamide
- CAS Number: 42045-97-6
- PubChem CID: 162056
- ChemSpider: 142327
- UNII: S07S9928YH
- CompTox Dashboard (EPA): DTXSID00962230

Chemical and physical data
- Formula: C_{24}H_{32}N_{2}O
- Molar mass: 364.533 g·mol^{−1}
- 3D model (JSmol): Interactive image
- SMILES: O=C(N(c1ccccc1)C3CC(N(CCc2ccccc2)CC3C)C)CC
- InChI: InChI=1S/C24H32N2O/c1-4-24(27)26(22-13-9-6-10-14-22)23-17-20(3)25(18-19(23)2)16-15-21-11-7-5-8-12-21/h5-14,19-20,23H,4,15-18H2,1-3H3; Key:ODPKHHGQKIYCTJ-UHFFFAOYSA-N

Phenaridine (2,5-dimethylfentanyl) is an opioid analgesic that is an analogue of fentanyl. It was developed in 1972, and is used for surgical anasthesia.

Phenaridine has similar effects to fentanyl. It is slightly less potent than fentanyl in rats. Side effects of fentanyl analogs are similar to those of fentanyl itself, which include itching, nausea and potentially serious respiratory depression, which can be life-threatening. Irresponsible use of fentanyl analogues administrated in several times larger doses than recommended, have ended up in a death of hundreds of people throughout Europe and the former Soviet republics since the most recent resurgence in use began in Estonia in the early 2000s, and novel derivatives continue to appear.

== See also ==
- 3-Methylfentanyl
- 4-Fluorofentanyl
- α-Methylfentanyl
- Acetylfentanyl
- Fentanyl tropane
- Furanylfentanyl
- List of fentanyl analogues
