= ANPP =

ANPP may refer to:

- 4-anilino-N-phenethylpiperidine – a direct precursor to fentanyl and acetylfentanyl
- All Nigeria Peoples Party
- Armenian Nuclear Power Plant
- The Army Nuclear Power Program, a United States program to develop small nuclear power plants
- The National Assembly of People's Power (Asamblea Nacional del Poder Popular), the legislature of Cuba
