= Fentanyl tropane =

Chemical compound

Identifiers
- IUPAC name: N-phenyl-N-[(1R,5S)-8-(2-phenylethyl)-8-azabicyclo[3.2.1]octan-3-yl]propanamide
- CAS Number: 76754-18-2
- PubChem CID: 118718255
- ChemSpider: 58131720
- ChEMBL: ChEMBL3349244

Chemical and physical data
- Formula: C_{24}H_{30}N_{2}O
- Molar mass: 362.517 g·mol^{−1}
- 3D model (JSmol): Interactive image
- SMILES: CCC(=O)N(C1C[C@H]2CC[C@@H](C1)N2CCC3=CC=CC=C3)C4=CC=CC=C4
- InChI: InChI=1S/C24H30N2O/c1-2-24(27)26(20-11-7-4-8-12-20)23-17-21-13-14-22(18-23)25(21)16-15-19-9-5-3-6-10-19/h3-12,21-23H,2,13-18H2,1H3/t21-,22+,23?; Key:OLHSRBZZORBSLQ-AIZNXBIQSA-N

Fentanyl tropane (tropafentanyl) is an opioid derivative which is an analogue of fentanyl, where the central piperidine ring has been bridged with a two carbon chain to form a tropane ring. It is made from tropinone in a similar manner to how fentanyl is made from 4-piperidone, and has two isomers, with the 3β isomer being around half the potency of fentanyl while the 3α isomer is much weaker, only around the same potency as morphine.

== See also ==
- Fentanyl azepane
- Secofentanyl
- Phenaridine
- List of fentanyl analogues
