= 4-Chloroisobutyrylfentanyl =

Opioid analgesic

Legal status
- Legal status: US: Schedule I; Illegal in Finland and Sweden

Identifiers
- IUPAC name: 2-Methyl-N-(4-chlorophenyl)-N-[1-(1-phenylpropan-2-yl)piperidin-4-yl]propanamide
- CAS Number: 244195-34-4
- PubChem CID: 100974915
- ChemSpider: 81367196
- UNII: 6DS2GH6V2D

Chemical and physical data
- Formula: C_{23}H_{29}ClN_{2}O
- Molar mass: 384.95 g·mol^{−1}
- 3D model (JSmol): Interactive image
- SMILES: c3ccccc3CCN(CC1)CCC1N(C(=O)C(C)C)c(cc2)ccc2Cl
- InChI: InChI=InChI=1S/C23H29ClN2O/c1-18(2)23(27)26(21-10-8-20(24)9-11-21)22-13-16-25(17-14-22)15-12-19-6-4-3-5-7-19/h3-11,18,22H,12-17H2,1-2H3; Key:YWHLYGSHOQKCJG-UHFFFAOYSA-N

4-Chloroisobutyrylfentanyl (para-Chloroisobutyrylfentanyl, 4-Cl-iBF) is an opioid analgesic that is an analog of fentanyl, and has been sold online as a designer drug.

== Side effects ==
Side effects of fentanyl analogs are similar to those of fentanyl itself, which include itching, nausea and potentially serious respiratory depression, which can be life-threatening. Fentanyl analogs have killed hundreds of people throughout Europe and the former Soviet republics since the most recent resurgence in use began in Estonia in the early 2000s, and novel derivatives continue to appear. A new wave of fentanyl analogues and associated deaths began in around 2014 in the US, and have continued to grow in prevalence; especially since 2016 these drugs have been responsible for hundreds of overdose deaths every week.

== Legal status ==
para-Chloroisobutyrylfentanyl has been a Schedule I controlled drug in the United States since 1 February 2018. It was banned in Finland in September 2017, and in Sweden in October 2017.

== See also ==
- 4-Bromofentanyl
- Acetylfentanyl
- Butyrfentanyl
- Furanylfentanyl
- List of fentanyl analogues
