= C24H32N2O =

The molecular formula C_{24}H_{32}N_{2}O may refer to:

- APICA (synthetic cannabinoid drug) (SDB-001)
- 3-Methylbutyrfentanyl (3-MBF)
- Phenaridine
- Valerylfentanyl
