= C13H16ClNO =

The molecular formula C_{13}H_{16}ClNO (molar mass: 237.72 g/mol, exact mass: 237.0920 u) may refer to:

- Ketamine
  - Arketamine, or (R)-(−)-ketamine
  - Esketamine, also known as (S)-ketamine or (S)-(+)-ketamine
- 1-(2-Chloro-N-methylbenzimidoyl)cyclopentanol
