= 4-Bromofentanyl =

Chemical compound

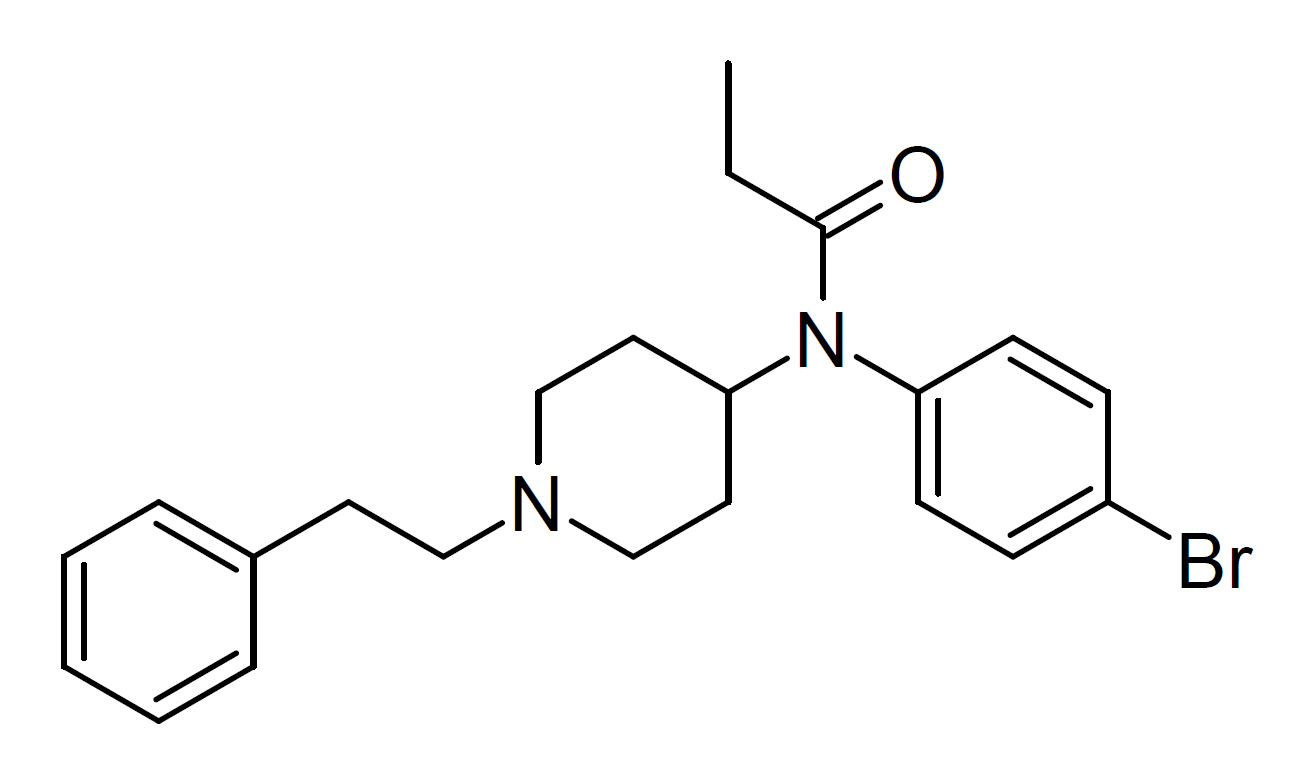

Legal status
- Legal status: US: Schedule I

Identifiers
- IUPAC name: N-(4-bromophenyl)-N-[1-(2-phenylethyl)piperidin-4-yl]propanamide
- CAS Number: 117994-23-7
- PubChem CID: 14129713
- ChemSpider: 76714532
- UNII: V5YML8X2JV
- CompTox Dashboard (EPA): DTXSID801036971

Chemical and physical data
- Formula: C_{22}H_{27}BrN_{2}O
- Molar mass: 415.375 g·mol^{−1}
- 3D model (JSmol): Interactive image
- SMILES: CCC(=O)N(C1CCN(CC1)CCC2=CC=CC=C2)C3=CC=C(C=C3)Br
- InChI: InChI=1S/C22H27BrN2O/c1-2-22(26)25(20-10-8-19(23)9-11-20)21-13-16-24(17-14-21)15-12-18-6-4-3-5-7-18/h3-11,21H,2,12-17H2,1H3; Key:UTXQWNZEVFXSIA-UHFFFAOYSA-N

4-Bromofentanyl (para-bromofentanyl) is an opioid analgesic drug that is an analog of fentanyl and has been sold as a designer drug, first identified in Pennsylvania in the US in March 2020.

== Effects ==
The effects of fentanyl analogs are similar to those of fentanyl itself, which include potent sedation and analgesia, along with side effects such as itching, nausea and potentially serious respiratory depression, which can be life-threatening. Fentanyl analogs have killed thousands of people throughout the world since the most recent resurgence in use began in Estonia in the early 2000s, and novel derivatives continue to appear. A new wave of fentanyl analogues and associated deaths began in around 2014 in the US, and have continued to grow in prevalence; especially since 2016 these drugs have been responsible for hundreds of overdose deaths every week.

== Legal status ==
4-Bromofentanyl is a Schedule I controlled drug in the United States under the fentanyl analogue provisions that were introduced in 2018, despite not being specifically listed in its own right.

== See also ==
- 4-Chloroisobutyrylfentanyl
- 4-Fluorofentanyl
- List of fentanyl analogues
