= N-Phenethyl-4-piperidinone =

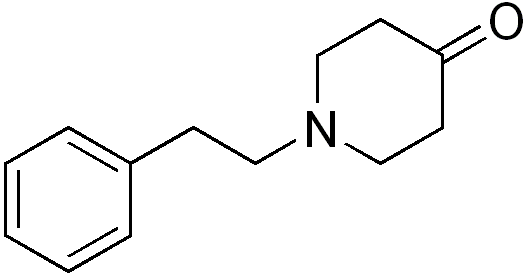

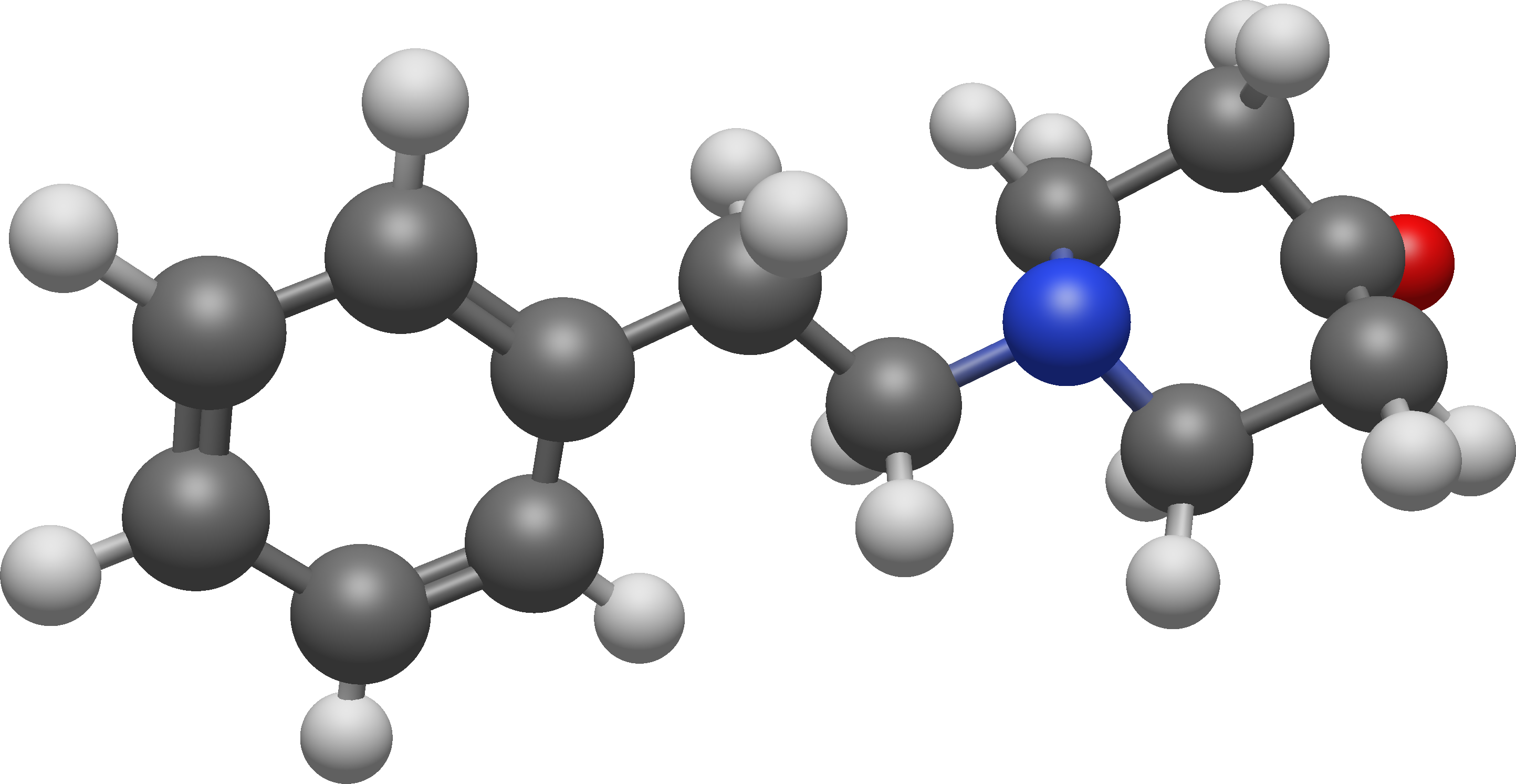

Names
- Preferred IUPAC name 1-(2-Phenylethyl)piperidin-4-one
- Other names 1-Phenethylpiperidin-4-one (no longer recommended); N-Phenylethyl-4-piperidinone; N-Phenethyl-4-piperidone

Identifiers
CAS Number	39742-60-4
3D model (JSmol)	Interactive image
Abbreviations	NPP
ChemSpider	87058
ECHA InfoCard	100.049.630
PubChem CID	96437
UNII	CIS0S4O95K
CompTox Dashboard (EPA)	DTXSID30192826
- InChI: InChI=1S/C13H17NO/c15-13-7-10-14(11-8-13)9-6-12-4-2-1-3-5-12/h1-5H,6-11H2 Key: YDJXNYNKKXZBMP-UHFFFAOYSA-N; InChI=1/C13H17NO/c15-13-7-10-14(11-8-13)9-6-12-4-2-1-3-5-12/h1-5H,6-11H2 Key: YDJXNYNKKXZBMP-UHFFFAOYAQ
- SMILES: O=C2CCN(CCc1ccccc1)CC2

Properties
Chemical formula	C_{13}H_{17}NO
Molar mass	203.28 g/mol
Density	1.057 g/cm^{3}
Melting point	56 to 60 °C (133 to 140 °F; 329 to 333 K)

Hazards
- GHS labelling
Pictograms	(GHS07: Exclamation mark)
Signal word	Warning
Hazard statements	H302
Precautionary statements	P264, P270
NFPA 704 (fire diamond)	1 3
Legal status	AU: S9 (Prohibited substance); BR: Class D1 (Drug precursors)
- Except where otherwise noted, data are given for materials in their standard state (at 25 °C [77 °F], 100 kPa). verify (what is ?) Infobox references

N-Phenethyl-4-piperidinone (NPP) is a derivative of 4-piperidinone with the molecular formula C_{13}H_{17}NO. It is used as an intermediate in the manufacture of chemicals and pharmaceutical drugs such as fentanyl.

Because of its possible use in the illicit manufacture of fentanyl, the United States Drug Enforcement Administration (DEA) placed NPP under control as a List 1 Chemical in 2007. Both domestic sales and domestic importations are thus subject to DEA reporting requirements.

== Preparation ==
N-Phenethyl-4-piperidinone can be prepared from 4-piperidinone and phenethyl bromide in biphasic conditions with a variety of phase transfer catalysts.

== Uses ==
N-Phenethyl-4-piperidinone is useful in the synthesis of addictive drugs, primarily fentanyl and its analogs. Paul Janssen (founder of Janssen Pharmaceutica) first synthesized fentanyl in 1960 from Benzylfentanyl. The Siegfried method (shown below and published on The Hive) involves reacting N-phenethyl-4-piperidinone with aniline, and then reducing the imine product with sodium borohydride to 4-anilino-N-phenethylpiperidine (ANPP). This product is reacted with propionyl chloride to form fentanyl.

There are a handful of other uses (although less common):

1. PD180787
2. Propinetidine
3. Fenspiride
4. Capeserod
5. PEPAP
