= Fentanyl azepane =

Chemical compound

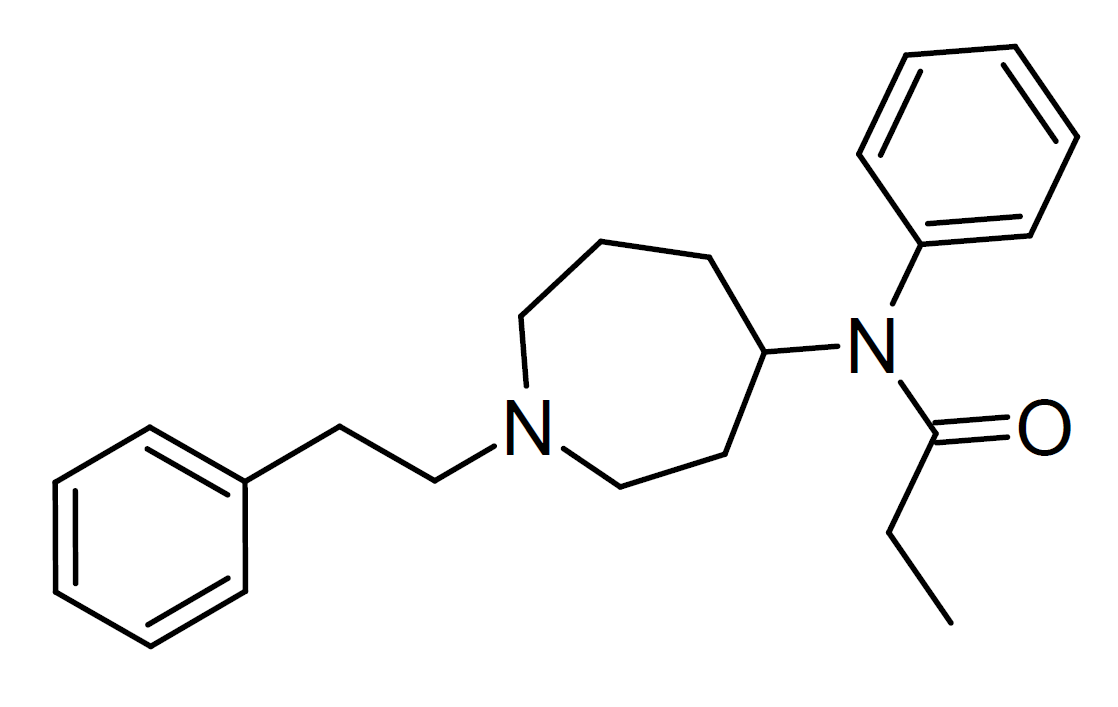

Identifiers
- IUPAC name: N-phenyl-N-[1-(2-phenylethyl)azepan-4-yl]propanamide
- CAS Number: 344235-54-7
- PubChem CID: 12666096
- ChemSpider: 10495507
- ChEMBL: ChEMBL171124

Chemical and physical data
- Formula: C_{23}H_{30}N_{2}O
- Molar mass: 350.506 g·mol^{−1}
- 3D model (JSmol): Interactive image
- SMILES: CCC(=O)N(C1CCCN(CC1)CCC2=CC=CC=C2)C3=CC=CC=C3
- InChI: InChI=1S/C23H30N2O/c1-2-23(26)25(21-12-7-4-8-13-21)22-14-9-17-24(19-16-22)18-15-20-10-5-3-6-11-20/h3-8,10-13,22H,2,9,14-19H2,1H3; Key:DJCBYHBSPDXQNT-UHFFFAOYSA-N

Fentanyl azepane (Fentanyl azepane homologue) is an opioid derivative which is a homologue of fentanyl, where the central piperidine ring has been expanded to an azepane ring. It is many times less potent than fentanyl itself, being only slightly stronger than morphine, but is still more potent than the ring-contracted pyrrolidine derivative, as well as other related compounds such as benzylfentanyl and ethoheptazine. The β-hydroxy derivative is slightly more potent again, as with betahydroxyfentanyl.

== See also ==
- 3-Methylfentanyl
- Fentanyl tropane
- Homofentanyl
- Secofentanyl
- Proheptazine
- List of fentanyl analogues
