= Secofentanyl =

Chemical compound

Identifiers
- IUPAC name: N-[4-[methyl(2-phenylethyl)amino]butan-2-yl]-N-phenylpropanamide
- CAS Number: 253342-66-4
- PubChem CID: 11724725
- UNII: DGK2A2KAN8
- CompTox Dashboard (EPA): DTXSID901040103

Chemical and physical data
- Formula: C_{22}H_{30}N_{2}O
- Molar mass: 338.495 g·mol^{−1}
- 3D model (JSmol): Interactive image
- SMILES: CCC(=O)N(C1=CC=CC=C1)C(C)CCN(C)CCC2=CC=CC=C2
- InChI: InChI=1S/C22H30N2O/c1-4-22(25)24(21-13-9-6-10-14-21)19(2)15-17-23(3)18-16-20-11-7-5-8-12-20/h5-14,19H,4,15-18H2,1-3H3; Key:TVSLDWMMAUJGPV-UHFFFAOYSA-N

Secofentanyl is an opioid derivative which is an analogue of fentanyl where the piperidine ring has been cleaved to form an open-chain structure. It is around 40× less potent than fentanyl itself but still 5–6× the potency of morphine in animal tests.

== See also ==
- Benzylfentanyl
- Homofentanyl
- Diampromide
- Fentanyl azepane
- Isofentanyl
- Phenampromide
