= 2,2'-Difluorofentanyl =

Opioid analgesic designer drug

Legal status
- Legal status: US: Schedule I

Identifiers
- IUPAC name: N-(2-Fluorophenyl)-N-[1-[2-(2-fluorophenyl)ethyl]piperidin-4-yl]propanamide
- CAS Number: 2748343-87-3
- PubChem CID: 137700285
- ChemSpider: 129434280
- UNII: B61QTX2SWO

Chemical and physical data
- Formula: C_{22}H_{26}F_{2}N_{2}O
- Molar mass: 372.460 g·mol^{−1}
- 3D model (JSmol): Interactive image
- SMILES: CCC(=O)N(C1CCN(CC1)CCC2=CC=CC=C2F)C3=CC=CC=C3F
- InChI: InChI=1S/C22H26F2N2O/c1-2-22(27)26(21 – 10-6-5-9-20(21)24)18 – 12 – 15-25(16 – 13 – 18)14 – 11 – 17-7-3-4-8 – 19(17)23/h3 – 10,18H,2,11 – 16H2,1H3; Key:AUXYZYMWQUXVDV-UHFFFAOYSA-N

2,2'-Difluorofentanyl (2'-fluoro ortho-fluorofentanyl) is an opioid analgesic that is an analog of fentanyl which has been sold as a designer drug.

== Side effects ==
Side effects of fentanyl analogs are similar to those of fentanyl itself, which include itching, nausea and potentially serious respiratory depression, which can be life-threatening. Fentanyl analogs have killed hundreds of people throughout Europe and the former Soviet republics since the most recent resurgence in use began in Estonia in the early 2000s, and novel derivatives continue to appear. A new wave of fentanyl analogues and associated deaths began in around 2014 in the US, and have continued to grow in prevalence; especially since 2016 these drugs have been responsible for hundreds of overdose deaths every week.

== Legal status ==
As a ring-substituted derivative of fentanyl, 2,2'-difluorofentanyl is banned under drug analog laws in the United States and other jurisdictions around the world.

== See also ==
- Orthofluorofentanyl
- List of fentanyl analogues
