= Diampromide =

Opioid analgesic drug

Clinical data
- Other names: Diampromide
- ATC code: none

Legal status
- Legal status: AU: S9 (Prohibited substance); BR: Class A1 (Narcotic drugs); CA: Schedule I; DE: Anlage I (Authorized scientific use only); US: Schedule I; UN: Psychotropic Schedule I

Identifiers
- IUPAC name: N-[2-(Methyl-(2-phenylethyl)amino)propyl]-N-phenylpropanamide
- CAS Number: 552-25-0
- PubChem CID: 62370
- DrugBank: DB01502
- ChemSpider: 56158
- UNII: 26G7YC77BU
- KEGG: D12694
- ChEMBL: ChEMBL2106220
- CompTox Dashboard (EPA): DTXSID70862177

Chemical and physical data
- Formula: C_{21}H_{28}N_{2}O
- Molar mass: 324.468 g·mol^{−1}
- 3D model (JSmol): Interactive image
- SMILES: CCC(=O)N(CC(C)N(C)CCc1ccccc1)c1ccccc1
- InChI: InChI=1S/C21H28N2O/c1-4-21(24)23(20-13-9-6-10-14-20)17-18(2)22(3)16-15-19-11-7-5-8-12-19/h5-14,18H,4,15-17H2,1-3H3; Key:RXTHKWVSXOIHJS-UHFFFAOYSA-N

Diampromide is an opioid analgesic from the ampromide family of drugs, related to other drugs such as propiram and phenampromide. It was invented in the 1960s by American Cyanamid, and can be described as a ring-opened analogue of fentanyl.

Diampromide produces similar effects to other opioids, including analgesia, sedation, dizziness and nausea, and is around the same potency as morphine.

Diampromide is in Schedule I of the Controlled Substances Act 1970 of the United States as a Narcotic with ACSCN 9615 with a zero aggregate manufacturing quota as of 2014. It is listed under the Single Convention for the Control of Narcotic Substances 1961 and is controlled in most countries in the same fashion as is morphine.

== See also ==
- Secofentanyl
