= Propiram =

Opioid analgesic drug

Clinical data
- Routes of administration: By mouth, injected
- ATC code: none

Legal status
- Legal status: AU: S8 (Controlled drug); BR: Class A2 (Narcotic drugs); CA: Schedule I; DE: Anlage II (Authorized trade only, not prescriptible); US: Schedule I

Pharmacokinetic data
- Bioavailability: 97%
- Elimination half-life: 5.2 hours

Identifiers
- IUPAC name: N-(1-Methyl-2-piperidin-1-ylethyl)-N-pyridin-2-ylpropanamide
- CAS Number: 15686-91-6
- PubChem CID: 26216
- ChemSpider: 24426
- UNII: WT6247U6PX
- CompTox Dashboard (EPA): DTXSID1023522
- ECHA InfoCard: 100.036.144

Chemical and physical data
- Formula: C_{16}H_{25}N_{3}O
- Molar mass: 275.396 g·mol^{−1}
- 3D model (JSmol): Interactive image
- SMILES: O=C(N(c1ncccc1)C(CN2CCCCC2)C)CC
- InChI: InChI=1S/C16H25N3O/c1-3-16(20)19(15-9-5-6-10-17-15)14(2)13-18-11-7-4-8-12-18/h5-6,9-10,14H,3-4,7-8,11-13H2,1-2H3; Key:ZBAFFZBKCMWUHM-UHFFFAOYSA-N

Propiram (Algeril, Dirame, Bay 4503) is a partial μ-opioid receptor agonist and weak μ antagonist analgesic from the ampromide family of drugs related to other drugs such as phenampromide and diampromide. It was invented in 1963 in the United Kingdom by Bayer but was not widely marketed, although it saw some limited clinical use, especially in dentistry. Propiram reached Phase III clinical trials in the United States and Canada.

== Pharmacology ==
Propiram exhibits weak opioid antagonist activity on the μ receptor—quite a bit weaker than its agonist effects—and the effect on κ- and δ-opioid, σ-receptors, or the NMDA system are not well understood. Other drugs of the partial μ-opioid agonist/antagonist type include meptazinol, buprenorphine, butorphanol, phenazocine, nalbuphine, pentazocine, dezocine and its relatives.

With about 10% of the analgesic potency of morphine, 50 mg of propiram is equivalent to about 60 mg of codeine or 50 mg of pentazocine. In many patients, propiram is an effective analgesic comparable to other drugs such as these as well as pethidine, with a normal dose of around 50–100 mg and a duration of action of 3 to 6 hours. It is more potent and effective than codeine, and longer-lasting and with a faster onset of action compared to pethidine. Side effects include sedation, dizziness, nausea and vomiting. Propiram has been available in oral, rectal, and injectable formulations, with bioavailability above 97% after oral administration.

== Derivatives ==
Many related compounds are known, although only propiram was ever commercialized. The addition of a 4-phenyl group on the piperidine increases potency by a factor of 133x compared to the parent compound. Addition of a 3,3-dimethyl moiety to the piperidine ring increases potency by 45x compared to the title compound and 3D overlay using CHARMM shows that this class overlays the fentanyl scaffold in the positioning of aryl groups, basic nitrogen and amide moieties perfectly.

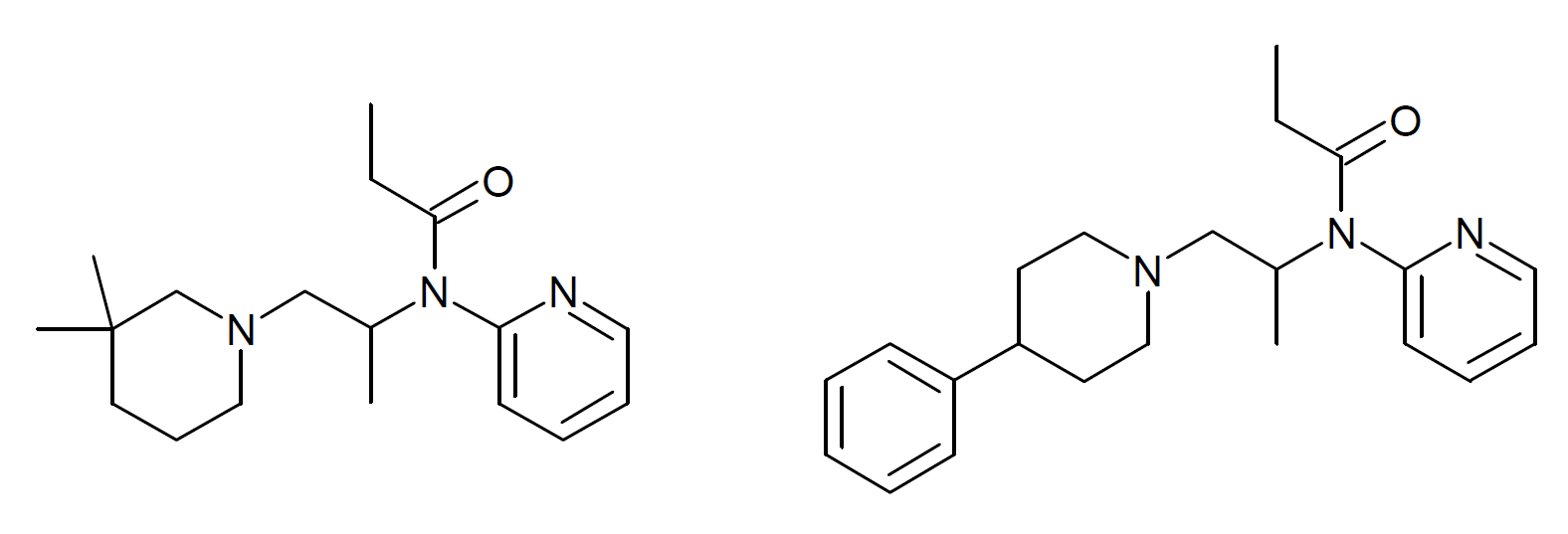
3,3-Dimethylpropiram, CAS# 24639-20-1, and 4-Phenylpropiram, CAS# 54152-81-7

== Regulation ==
Propiram is currently a Schedule I/Narcotic controlled substance in the United States with an ACSCN of 9649 and a zero annual aggregate manufacturing quota as of 2014. It has been almost exclusively formulated as the fumarate salt.
