= Phenampromide =

Chemical compound

Clinical data
- Routes of administration: ?
- ATC code: none

Legal status
- Legal status: AU: S9 (Prohibited substance); BR: Class A1 (Narcotic drugs) .; CA: Schedule I; DE: Anlage I (Authorized scientific use only); UK: ?; US: Schedule I

Identifiers
- IUPAC name: N-(1-Methyl-2-piperidin-1-ylethyl)-N-phenylpropanamide
- CAS Number: 129-83-9
- PubChem CID: 8523
- ChemSpider: 16735960
- UNII: 0600L2M6EZ
- KEGG: D12693
- CompTox Dashboard (EPA): DTXSID10911012
- ECHA InfoCard: 100.004.517

Chemical and physical data
- Formula: C_{17}H_{26}N_{2}O
- Molar mass: 274.408 g·mol^{−1}
- 3D model (JSmol): Interactive image
- SMILES: CCC(N(C1=CC=CC=C1)[C@@H](CN2CCCCC2)C)=O
- InChI: InChI=1S/C17H26N2O/c1-3-17(20)19(16-10-6-4-7-11-16)15(2)14-18-12-8-5-9-13-18/h4,6-7,10-11,15H,3,5,8-9,12-14H2,1-2H3/t15-/m1/s1; Key:DHTRHEVNFFZCNU-OAHLLOKOSA-N

Phenampromide is an opioid analgesic from the ampromide family of drugs, related to other drugs such as propiram and diampromide. It was invented in the 1960s by American Cyanamid Co. Although never given a general release, it was research found that 60 mg of phenampromide is equivalent to about 50 mg of codeine. Tests on its two enantiomers showed that all of the analgesic effects were caused by the (S)-isomer. Introduction of a phenyl group to the 4-position of the piperidine-ring produces a drug 60-fold more potent than morphine. The most potent reported derivative is 4-hydroxy-4-phenyl phenapromide which displays analgesic activity some x150 greater than morphine.

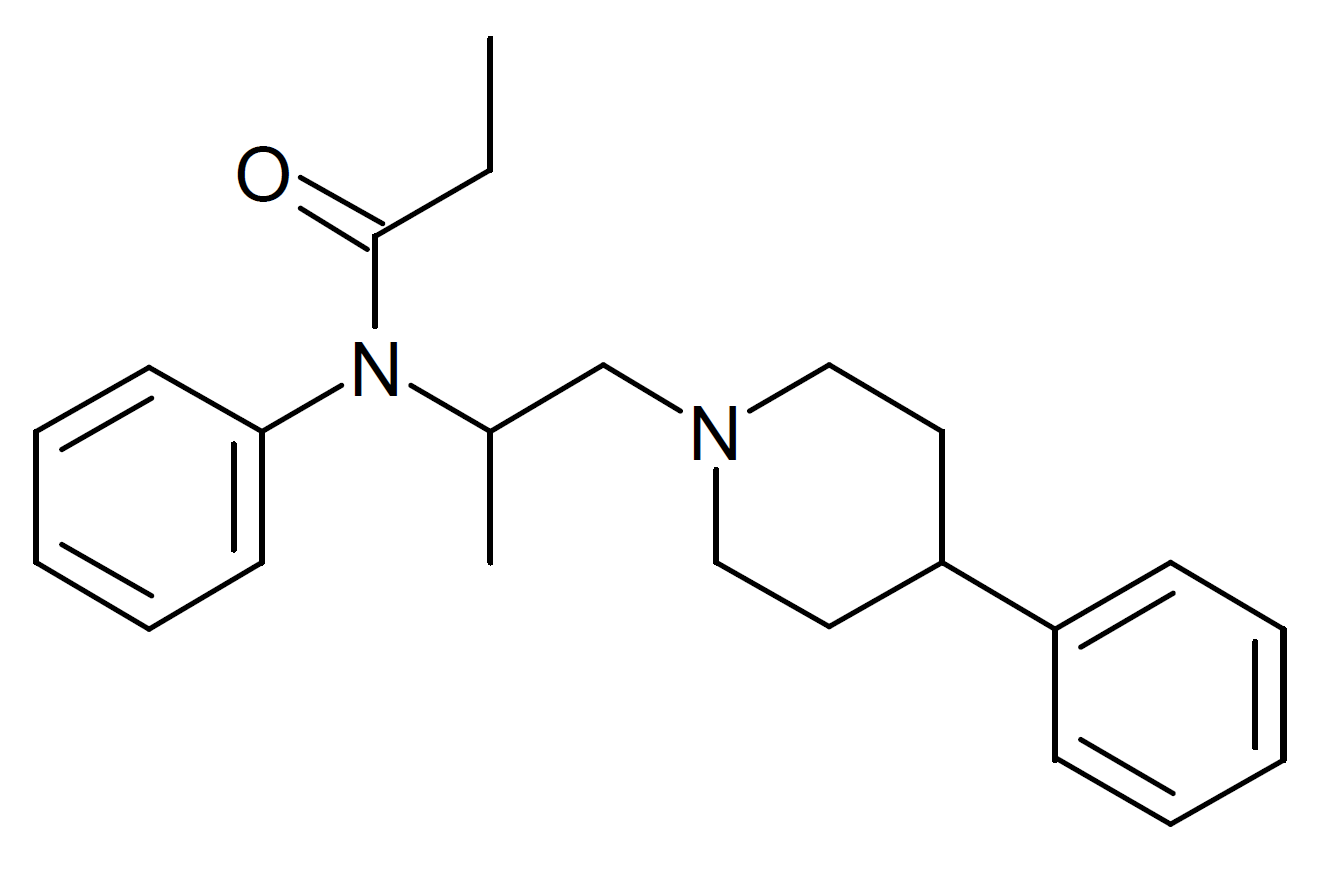
The fentanyl analogue 4-phenylphenampromide

Phenampromide produces similar effects to fentanyl, including analgesia, sedation, dizziness and nausea.

Phenampromide is in Schedule I of the Controlled Substances Act 1970 of the United States as a narcotic with ACSCN 9638 with a zero aggregate manufacturing quota as of 2014. The free base conversion ratio for salts includes 0.88 for the hydrochloride. It is listed under the Single Convention for the Control of Narcotic Substances 1961 and is controlled in most countries in the same fashion as fentanyl.
