= 1-(2-Chloro-N-methylbenzimidoyl)cyclopentanol =

Chemical compound

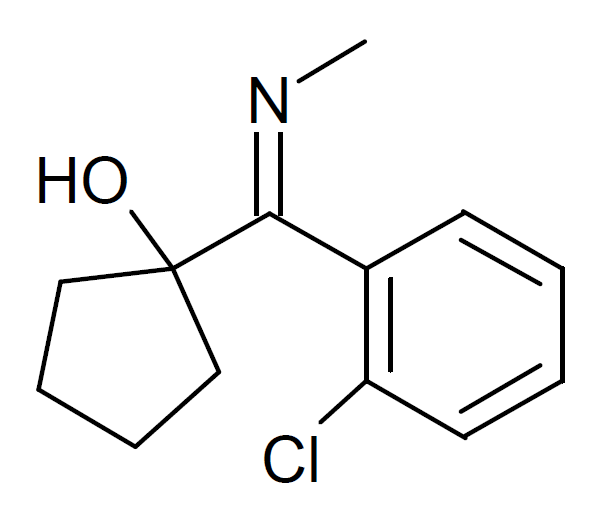

Identifiers
- IUPAC name: 1-[C-(2-chlorophenyl)-N-methylcarbonimidoyl]cyclopentan-1-ol
- CAS Number: 6740-87-0; hydrochloride: 90717-16-1
- PubChem CID: 13086940
- ChemSpider: 26551984
- UNII: HGI99H315N
- CompTox Dashboard (EPA): DTXSID60217758
- ECHA InfoCard: 100.169.732

Chemical and physical data
- Formula: C_{13}H_{16}ClNO
- Molar mass: 237.73 g·mol^{−1}
- 3D model (JSmol): Interactive image
- SMILES: CN=C(C1=CC=CC=C1Cl)C2(CCCC2)O
- InChI: InChI=1S/C13H16ClNO/c1-15-12(13(16)8-4-5-9-13)10-6-2-3-7-11(10)14/h2-3,6-7,16H,4-5,8-9H2,1H3; Key:FJGPXUPMNZOTLX-UHFFFAOYSA-N

1-(2-Chloro-N-methylbenzimidoyl)cyclopentanol, sometimes misleadingly referred to as hydroxylimine hydrochloride, is a chemical compound which is the final intermediate in the synthesis of ketamine, an anaesthetic drug which is also subject to recreational abuse. This chemical intermediate is not active as a drug in its own right, and is legal in most countries, but is readily converted into ketamine by dissolving it in a suitable high-boiling point solvent and heating, with no other chemicals required. This has made it subject to illicit trade as a drug precursor, and it has sometimes been seized by law enforcement agencies in significant quantities, leading to it being specifically banned as a controlled drug precursor in some jurisdictions such as Taiwan.

== See also ==
- 1-Boc-4-AP
- 1,6-Dioxecane-2,7-dione
- Alprazolam triazolobenzophenone
