= Isofentanyl =

Opioid analgesic designer drug

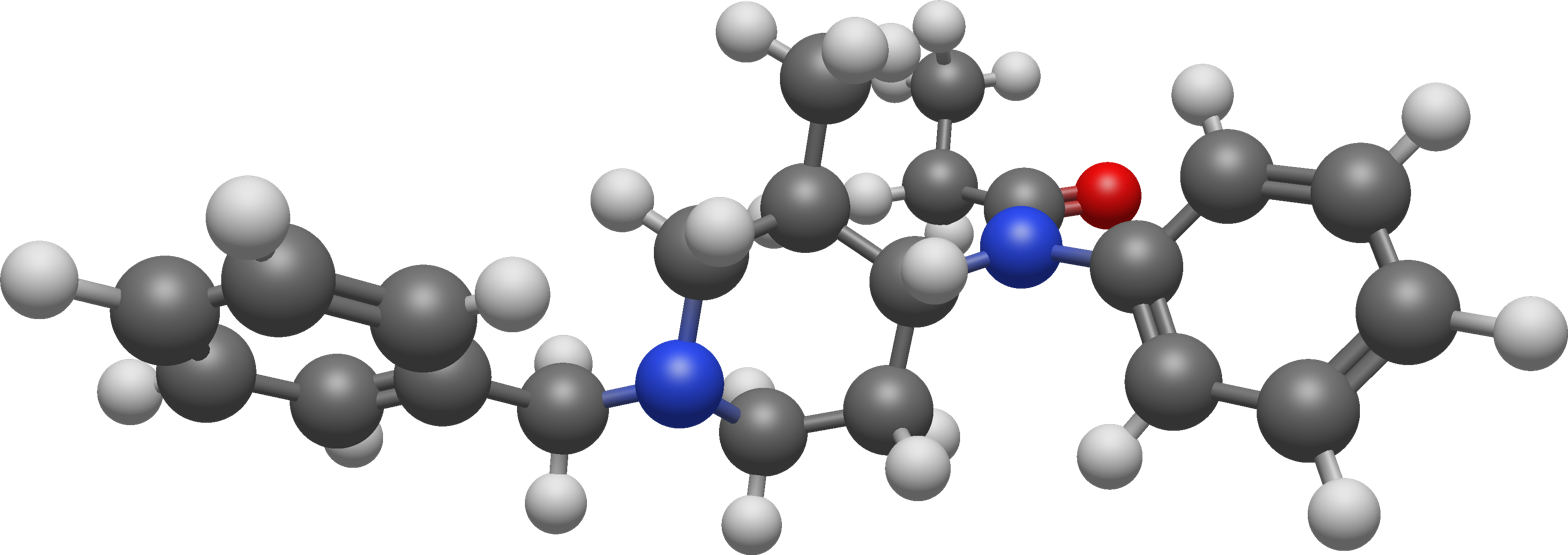

Legal status
- Legal status: US: Schedule I

Identifiers
- IUPAC name: N-(1-Benzyl-3-methylpiperidin-4-yl)-N-phenylpropanamide
- CAS Number: 79278-40-3
- PubChem CID: 10449690
- ChemSpider: 8625107
- UNII: BT57ARH9QX
- CompTox Dashboard (EPA): DTXSID00747120

Chemical and physical data
- Formula: C_{22}H_{28}N_{2}O
- Molar mass: 336.479 g·mol^{−1}
- 3D model (JSmol): Interactive image
- SMILES: c2ccccc2N(C(=O)CC)C1CCN(CC1C)Cc3ccccc3

Isofentanyl (3-methyl-benzylfentanyl) is an opioid analgesic that is an analog (and structural isomer) of fentanyl first invented in 1973, and which has been sold as a designer drug.

== Side effects ==
Side effects of fentanyl analogs are similar to those of fentanyl itself, which include itching, nausea and potentially serious respiratory depression, which can be life-threatening. Fentanyl analogs have killed hundreds of people throughout Europe and the former Soviet republics since the most recent resurgence in use began in Estonia in the early 2000s, and novel derivatives continue to appear. A new wave of fentanyl analogues and associated deaths began in around 2014 in the US, and have continued to grow in prevalence; especially since 2016 these drugs have been responsible for hundreds of overdose deaths every week.

== Legal status ==
As a structural isomer of fentanyl itself, isofentanyl is banned under drug analogue laws in many jurisdictions around the world. In the United States, fentanyl-related substances are Schedule I controlled substances.

== See also ==
- 3-Methylfentanyl
- Benzylfentanyl
- α-Methylacetylfentanyl
- 4-Methylphenethylacetylfentanyl
- Homofentanyl
- Secofentanyl
- List of fentanyl analogues
