= NFEPP =

Opioid analgesic drug

Clinical data
- Other names: 3-Fluorofentanyl
- Drug class: Opioid

Legal status
- Legal status: US: Schedule I

Identifiers
- IUPAC name: N-(3-Fluoro-1-phenethylpiperidin-4-yl)-N-phenylpropionamide
- CAS Number: 1422952-84-8
- PubChem CID: 71605072
- ChemSpider: 58826238
- UNII: NXR38LA4PA

Chemical and physical data
- Formula: C_{22}H_{27}FN_{2}O
- Molar mass: 354.469 g·mol^{−1}
- 3D model (JSmol): Interactive image
- SMILES: CCC(=O)N(c1ccccc1)[C@H]2CCN(C[C@H]2F)CCc3ccccc3
- InChI: InChI=1S/C22H27FN2O/c1-2-22(26)25(19-11-7-4-8-12-19)21-14-16-24(17-20(21)23)15-13-18-9-5-3-6-10-18/h3-12,20-21H,2,13-17H2,1H3/t20-,21+/m1/s1; Key:DMCQJJAWMFBPOX-RTWAWAEBSA-N

NFEPP (N-(3-fluoro-1-phenethylpiperidin-4-yl)-N-phenylpropionamide) is an analgesic opioid chemical, similar in structure to fentanyl, designed in 2016 by Spahn et al. from Free University of Berlin to avoid the standard negative side effects of opiates, including opioid overdose, by only targeting inflamed tissue.

== Pharmacology ==
Computer models suggest fentanyl binds to μ-opioid receptors in its protonated form. Fluorination of fentanyl at the 3-position lowers the pK_{a} of its conjugate acid from 8.4 to 6.8, a change designed to reduce its systemic effects while maintaining its potency in inflamed tissue, as this is a more acidic environment (pH 5–7) than non-inflamed tissue (pH 7.4).

In experiments on rats with different types of inflammatory pain, it has been shown that NFEPP produces injury-restricted analgesia, while exhibiting reduced typical opiate effects such as respiratory depression, sedation, constipation, and chemical seeking behavior.

As a result, NFEPP has the potential to reduce opioid addiction and dependency, as there is no effect on users who are not actually suffering from pain, as the chemical does not interact with non-inflamed brain tissue until much higher doses are reached.

Further research indicates other fluorinated derivatives of fentanyl, such as β-fluorofentanyl (FF3) or 2'-fluoro β-fluorofentanyl (RR-49), may be more effective in achieving high potency in damaged tissue with low potency in undamaged tissue.

== See also ==
- List of fentanyl analogues
