= Orthofluorofentanyl =

Opioid analgesic

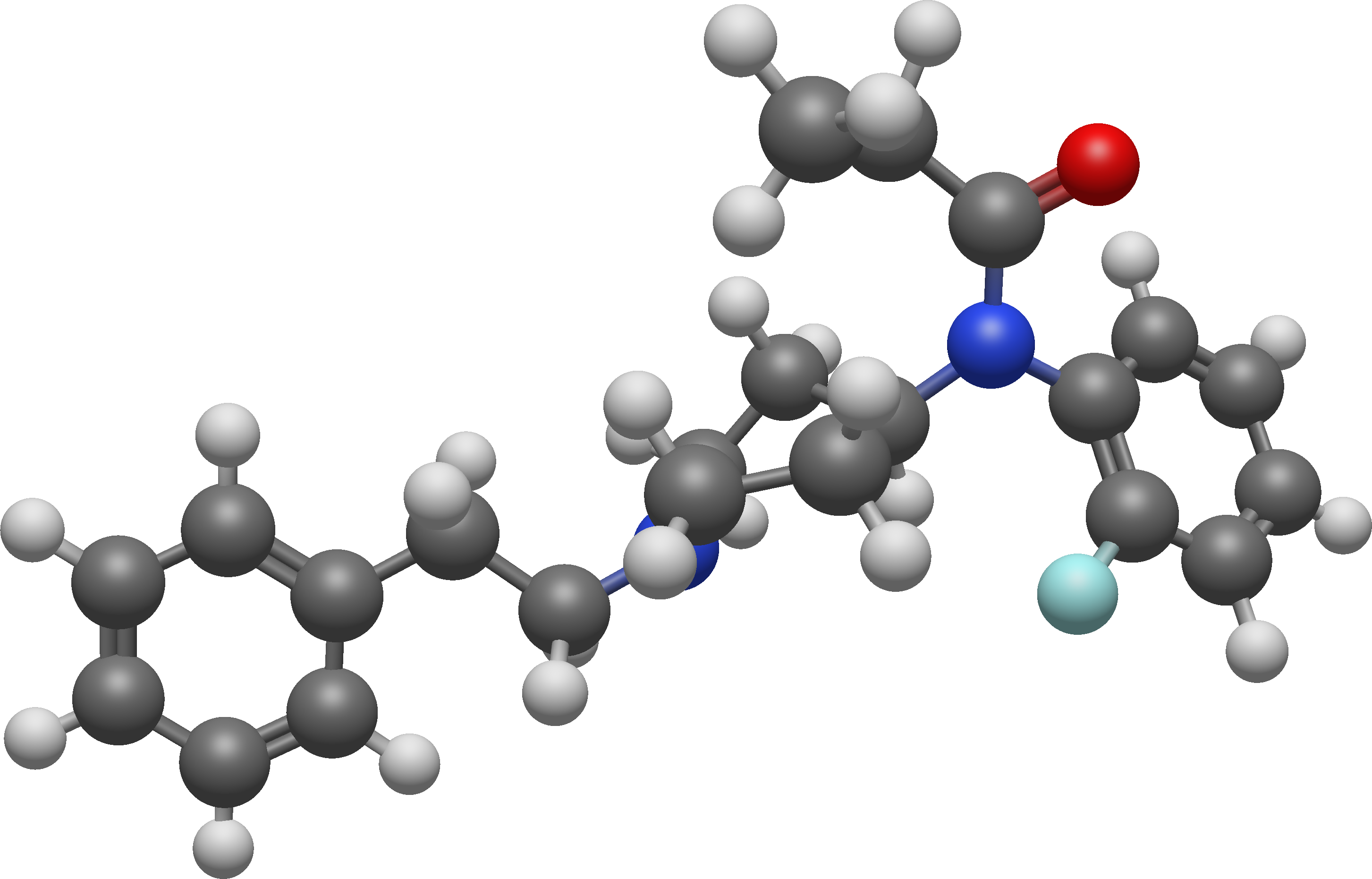

Legal status
- Legal status: BR: Class F1 (Prohibited narcotics); CA: Schedule I; DE: Anlage II (Authorized trade only, not prescriptible); UK: Class A; US: Schedule I

Identifiers
- IUPAC name: N-(2-Fluorophenyl)-N-[1-(2-phenylethyl)-4-piperidinyl]-propanamide
- CAS Number: 910616-29-4
- PubChem CID: 101454647
- ChemSpider: 59009033
- UNII: Y1S8D8G19A
- KEGG: C22766
- CompTox Dashboard (EPA): DTXSID601036775

Chemical and physical data
- Formula: C_{22}H_{27}FN_{2}O
- Molar mass: 354.469 g·mol^{−1}
- 3D model (JSmol): Interactive image
- SMILES: CCC(=O)N(C1CCN(CC1)CCC2=CC=CC=C2)C3=CC=CC=C3F
- InChI: InChI=1S/C22H27FN2O/c1-2-22(26)25(21-11-7-6-10-20(21)23)19-13-16-24(17-14-19)15-12-18-8-4-3-5-9-18/h3-11,19H,2,12-17H2,1H3; Key:BKUWDIVZCJNXRA-UHFFFAOYSA-N

Orthofluorofentanyl (o-fluorofentanyl, 2-fluorofentanyl) is an opioid analgesic that is an analog of fentanyl and has been sold online as a designer drug. While the structural isomer p-fluorofentanyl was one of the first illicit fentanyl analogues identified in 1981, Orthofluorofentanyl did not appear on the illicit market until August 2016.

== Side effects ==
Side effects of fentanyl analogs are similar to those of fentanyl itself, which include itching, nausea, and potentially serious respiratory depression, which can be life-threatening. Fentanyl analogs have killed hundreds of people throughout Europe and the former Soviet republics since the most recent resurgence in use began in Estonia in the early 2000s, and novel derivatives continue to appear. A new wave of fentanyl analogues and associated deaths began in around 2014 in the US, and have continued to grow in prevalence; especially since 2016 these drugs have been responsible for hundreds of overdose deaths every week.

== Legal status ==
Orthofluorofentanyl was placed into Schedule I in the US in October 2017, in order to avoid an imminent hazard to public safety.

== See also ==
- 2,2'-Difluorofentanyl
- 4-Fluorobutyrylfentanyl
- 4-Fluoroisobutyrylfentanyl
- Furanylfentanyl
- List of fentanyl analogues
