= Propionyl chloride =

Names
- Preferred IUPAC name Propanoyl chloride
- Other names Propionic chloride; propionic acid chloride (1:1)

Identifiers
CAS Number	79-03-8
3D model (JSmol)	Interactive image
ChemSpider	56119
ECHA InfoCard	100.001.064
EC Number	201-170-0
PubChem CID	62324
UNII	MB6VL5OMB9
UN number	1815 (PROPIONYL CHLORIDE)
CompTox Dashboard (EPA)	DTXSID4058819
- InChI: InChI=1S/C3H5ClO/c1-2-3(4)5/h2H2,1H3 Key: RZWZRACFZGVKFM-UHFFFAOYSA-N
- SMILES: CCC(=O)Cl

Properties
Chemical formula	C_{3}H_{5}ClO
Molar mass	92.52 g·mol^{−1}
Appearance	colorless liquid
Density	1.0646 g/cm^{3}
Melting point	−94 °C (−137 °F; 179 K)
Boiling point	80 °C (176 °F; 353 K)
Refractive index (n_{D})	1.404

Hazards
- Occupational safety and health (OHS/OSH)
Main hazards	Corrosive, flammable; highly toxic
- GHS labelling
Pictograms	(GHS02: Flammable) (GHS05: Corrosive)
Signal word	Danger
Hazard statements	H225, H314
Precautionary statements	P210, P233, P240, P241, P242, P243, P260, P264, P280, P301+P330+P331, P302+P361+P354, P303+P361+P353, P304+P340, P305+P354+P338, P316, P321, P363, P370+P378, P403+P235, P405, P501
NFPA 704 (fire diamond)	3 3 2 W
Flash point	54 °C (129 °F; 327 K)
- Lethal dose or concentration (LD, LC)
LD_{50} (median dose)	100 mg/kg (rat, oral)
- Except where otherwise noted, data are given for materials in their standard state (at 25 °C [77 °F], 100 kPa). Infobox references

Propionyl chloride (also propanoyl chloride) is the organic compound with the formula CH_{3}CH_{2}C(O)Cl. It is the acyl chloride derivative of propionic acid. It undergoes the characteristic reactions of acyl chlorides. It is a colorless, corrosive, volatile liquid.

It is used as a reagent for organic synthesis. In derived chiral amides and esters, the methylene protons are diastereotopic.

There have been efforts to schedule propionyl chloride as a DEA List 1 Chemical as it can be used to synthesize fentanyl.

== Synthesis ==
Propionyl chloride is industrially produced by chlorination of propionic acid with phosgene:

CH_{3}CH_{2}CO_{2}H + COCl_{2} → CH_{3}CH_{2}COCl + HCl + CO_{2}
