= Homofentanyl =

Opioid designer drug

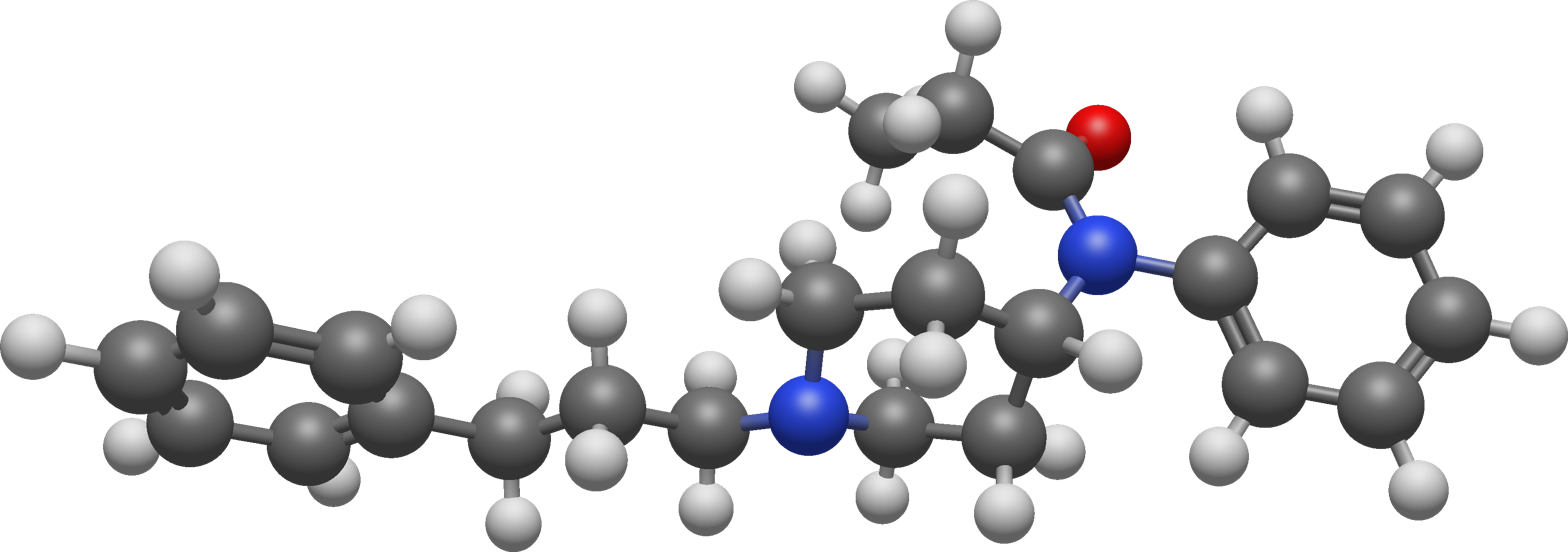

Identifiers
- IUPAC name: N-phenyl-N-[1-(3-phenylpropyl)piperidin-4-yl]propanamide
- CAS Number: 59708-54-2 117332-88-4 (HCl)
- PubChem CID: 618626
- ChemSpider: 537642
- UNII: GBD33DI2IP
- CompTox Dashboard (EPA): DTXSID701034384

Chemical and physical data
- Formula: C_{23}H_{30}N_{2}O
- Molar mass: 350.506 g·mol^{−1}
- 3D model (JSmol): Interactive image
- SMILES: CCC(=O)N(C1CCN(CC1)CCCC2=CC=CC=C2)C3=CC=CC=C3
- InChI: InChI=1S/C23H30N2O/c1-2-23(26)25(21-13-7-4-8-14-21)22-15-18-24(19-16-22)17-9-12-20-10-5-3-6-11-20/h3-8,10-11,13-14,22H,2,9,12,15-19H2,1H3; Key:CKBFKWWOUYBCRH-UHFFFAOYSA-N

Homofentanyl (N-phenylpropylnorfentanyl, fentanyl propyl analogue) is an opioid derivative which has been sold as a designer drug. It is a homologue of fentanyl, with similar analgesic and sedative effects but lower potency, around 14 times stronger than pethidine.

== See also ==
- Acetylfentanyl
- Benzylfentanyl
- Butyrylfentanyl
- Fentanyl azepane
- Isofentanyl
- Secofentanyl
- OPPPP
