= Α-Methylfentanyl =

Opioid analgesic

α-Methylfentanyl

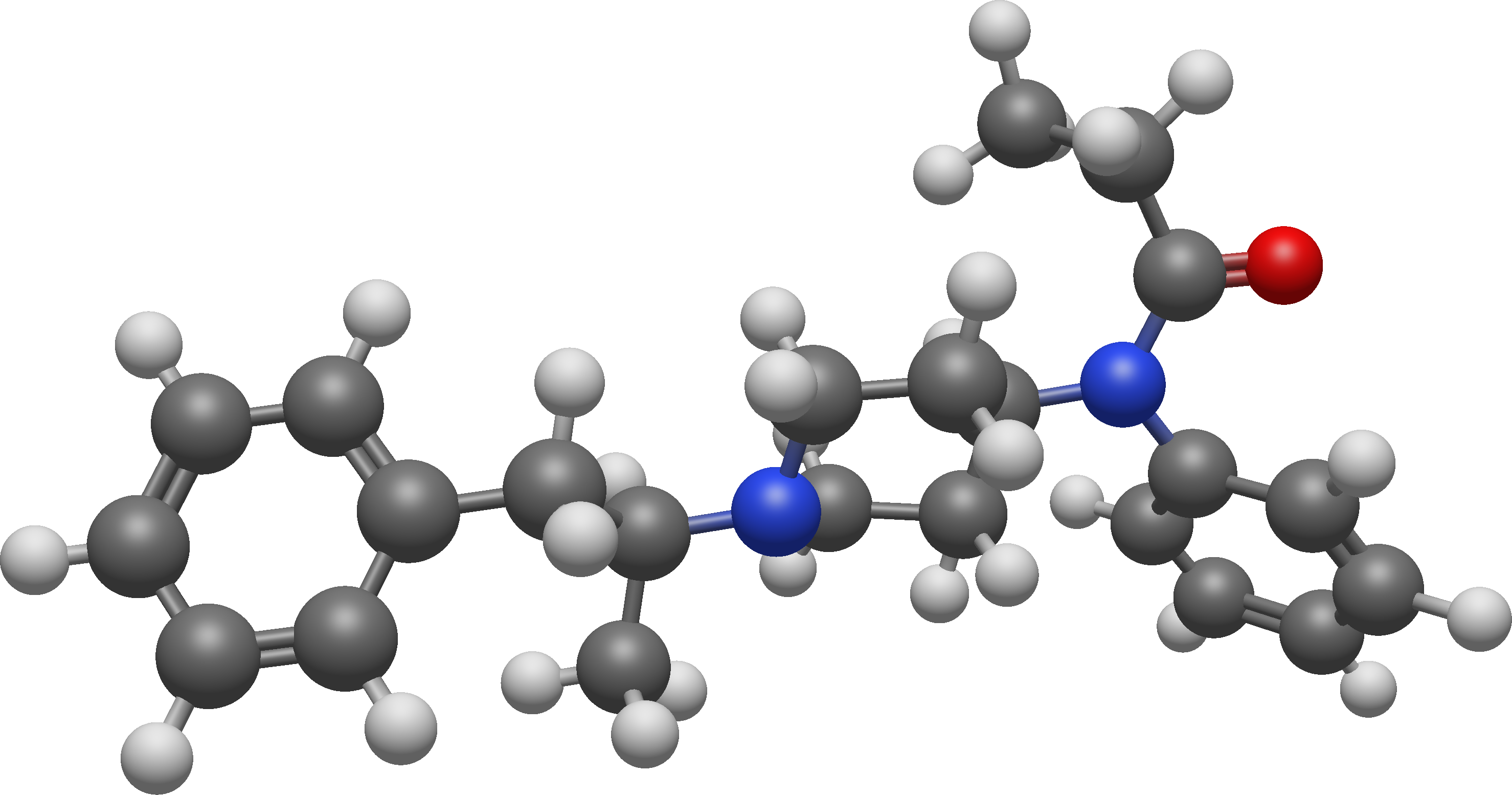

Clinical data
- Trade names: China White
- ATC code: none

Legal status
- Legal status: AU: S9 (Prohibited substance); BR: Class F1 (Prohibited narcotics); CA: Schedule I; DE: Anlage I (Authorized scientific use only); UK: Class A; US: Schedule I

Identifiers
- IUPAC name: N-phenyl-N-[1-(1-phenylpropan-2-yl)piperidin-4-yl]propanamide
- CAS Number: 79704-88-4
- PubChem CID: 62281
- DrugBank: DB01557
- ChemSpider: 56081
- UNII: 8FU589W85C
- KEGG: C22792
- ChEBI: CHEBI:234468
- CompTox Dashboard (EPA): DTXSID60273955

Chemical and physical data
- Formula: C_{23}H_{30}N_{2}O
- Molar mass: 350.506 g·mol^{−1}
- 3D model (JSmol): Interactive image
- SMILES: O=C(N(c1ccccc1)C3CCN(C(Cc2ccccc2)C)CC3)CC
- InChI: InChI=1S/C23H30N2O/c1-3-23(26)25(21-12-8-5-9-13-21)22-14-16-24(17-15-22)19(2)18-20-10-6-4-7-11-20/h4-13,19,22H,3,14-18H2,1-2H3; Key:NGTVDHYUFBKWID-UHFFFAOYSA-N

α-Methylfentanyl (or alpha-Methylfentanyl, α-MF) an opioid analgesic that is an analog of fentanyl. It is sometimes sold as "China White".

== History ==
α-Methylfentanyl was discovered by a team at Janssen Pharmaceuticals in the 1960s. In 1976, it began to appear mixed with heroin, as an additive, and the mixture was sometimes also called "China White". It was first identified in the bodies of two drug overdose victims in Orange County, California, in December 1979, who appeared to have died from opiate overdose but tested negative for any known drugs of this type. Over the next year, there were 13 more deaths, and eventually the responsible agent was identified as α-methylfentanyl.

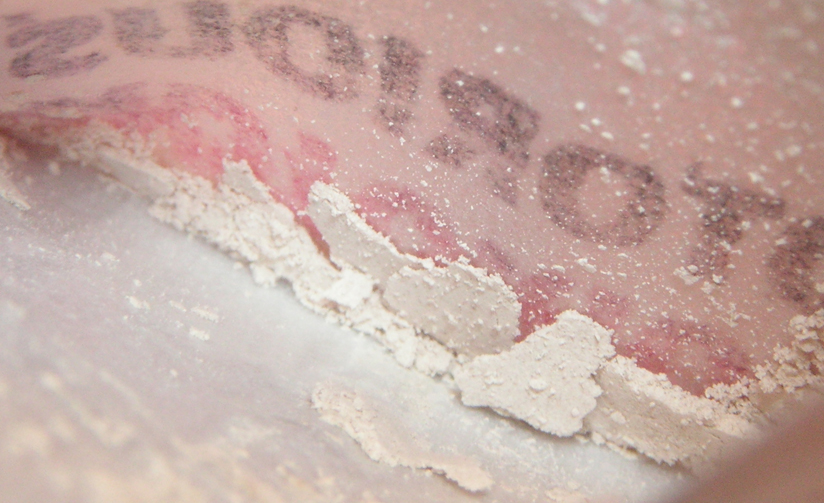
A sample of "China White"

α-Methylfentanyl was placed on the U.S. Schedule I list in September 1981, only two years after its appearance on the street, but already other fentanyl analogs were being developed. Following the appearance of α-methylfentanyl on the market, dozens of new fentanyl analogs have been reported, starting with para-fluorofentanyl, followed by α-methylacetylfentanyl, then by the highly potent 3-methylfentanyl, and subsequently by many others such as β-hydroxyfentanyl, ohmefentanyl, β-hydroxythiofentanyl and β-hydroxy-4-methylfentanyl. The development of such a wide structural family of novel narcotic drugs was a major factor responsible for the implementation of the Federal Analog Act which for the first time attempted to control entire families of drugs based on their structural similarity rather than scheduling new drug analogs individually as each appeared.

The chemical structure of fentanyl has been used as a basis in modern chemistry for the discovery and nomenclature of many new fentanyl analogues, sometimes called fentalogs.

In 1991, a group of Russian chemistry students discovered a simplified synthesis route which used phosgene instead of phenethylamine. Soon, abuse of the drug became widespread, causing a tenth of overdoses in the Moscow region.

== Effects ==
α-Methylfentanyl has similar effects to fentanyl. It is less potent by weight due to reduced binding affinity to its target site, but has an increased duration of action, as the α-methyl group interferes with binding to metabolic enzymes which break the drug down.

Since fentanyl itself is highly potent and notorious for causing fatal overdoses when abused, and also very short lasting with recreational users often administering doses every hour, α-methylfentanyl could have several advantages over the parent compound as a recreational drug. Side effects of fentanyl analogs are similar to those of fentanyl itself, which include itching, nausea and potentially serious respiratory depression (namely with overdoses or improper drug-combinations, such as with benzodiazepines) which can be life-threatening.

Fentanyl analogs such as α-methylfentanyl and 3-methylfentanyl are often used as the "cut" in small amounts in normal heroin stamps and bags, making them more potent and profitable than when sold as heroin alone due to the advantage of raising the retail price and potency per unit sold.

== See also ==
- 3-Methylbutyrfentanyl
- 3-Methylfentanyl
- 4-Fluorofentanyl
- Butyrfentanyl
- Furanylfentanyl
- List of fentanyl analogues
