= Parafluorofentanyl =

Opioid analgesic

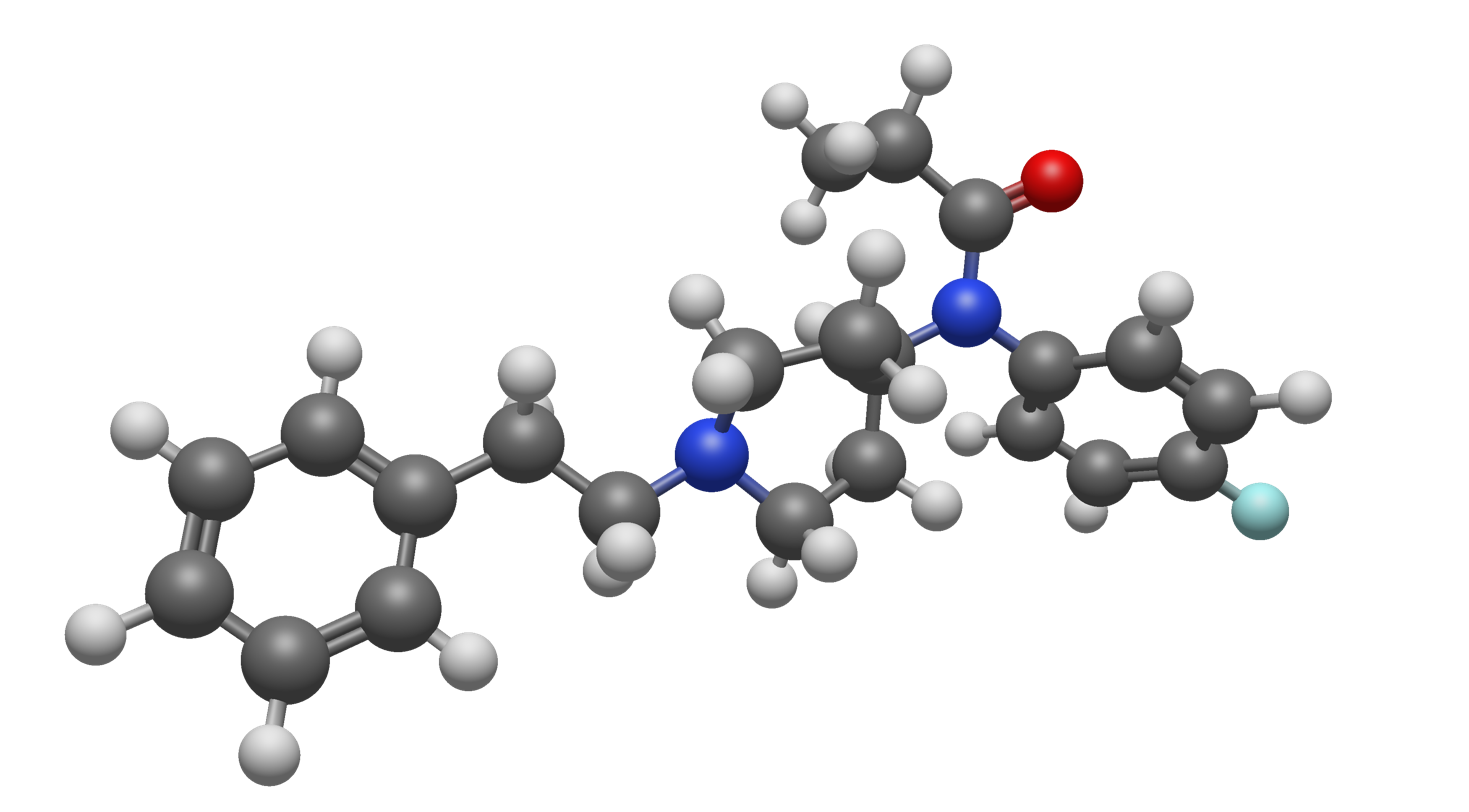

Clinical data
- Other names: 4-Fluorofentanyl; para-Fluorofentanyl; pFF
- ATC code: none

Legal status
- Legal status: BR: Class F1 (Prohibited narcotics); CA: Schedule I; DE: Anlage I (Authorized scientific use only); UK: Class A; US: Schedule I

Identifiers
- IUPAC name: N-(4-fluorophenyl)-N-[1-(2-phenylethyl)piperidin-4-yl]propanamide
- CAS Number: 90736-23-5
- PubChem CID: 62300
- ChemSpider: 56096
- UNII: I45R05QM0Z
- KEGG: C22769
- ChEBI: CHEBI:61074
- CompTox Dashboard (EPA): DTXSID0048929

Chemical and physical data
- Formula: C_{22}H_{27}FN_{2}O
- Molar mass: 354.469 g·mol^{−1}
- 3D model (JSmol): Interactive image
- SMILES: Fc1ccc(cc1)N(C(=O)CC)C3CCN(CCc2ccccc2)CC3
- InChI: InChI=1S/C22H27FN2O/c1-2-22(26)25(20-10-8-19(23)9-11-20)21-13-16-24(17-14-21)15-12-18-6-4-3-5-7-18/h3-11,21H,2,12-17H2,1H3; Key:KXUBAVLIJFTASZ-UHFFFAOYSA-N

Parafluorofentanyl (4-fluorofentanyl, para-fluorofentanyl, pFF) is an opioid analgesic analogue of fentanyl developed by Janssen Pharmaceuticals in the 1960s.

Parafluorofentanyl was sold briefly on the US black market in the early 1980s, before the introduction of the Federal Analog Act which for the first time attempted to control entire families of drugs based on their structural similarity rather than scheduling each drug individually as they appeared. Parafluorofentanyl is made by the same synthetic route as fentanyl, but by substituting para-fluoroaniline for aniline in the synthesis.

Side effects of fentanyl analogs are similar to those of fentanyl itself, which include itching, nausea, and potentially serious respiratory depression, which can be life-threatening. Fentanyl analogs have killed thousands of people throughout Europe and the former Soviet republics since the most recent resurgence in use began in Estonia in the early 2000s, and novel derivatives continue to appear.

In 2020, the Drug Enforcement Agency warned about the increasing prevalence of parafluorofentanyl in Arizona.

== See also ==
- 3-Methylbutyrfentanyl
- 3-Methylfentanyl
- 4-Fluorobutyrfentanyl
- 4-Fluoroisobutyrfentanyl
- α-Methylfentanyl
- Acetylfentanyl
- Butyrfentanyl
- Furanylfentanyl
- Orthofluorofentanyl
- List of fentanyl analogues
