= Acetylfentanyl =

Opioid analgesic

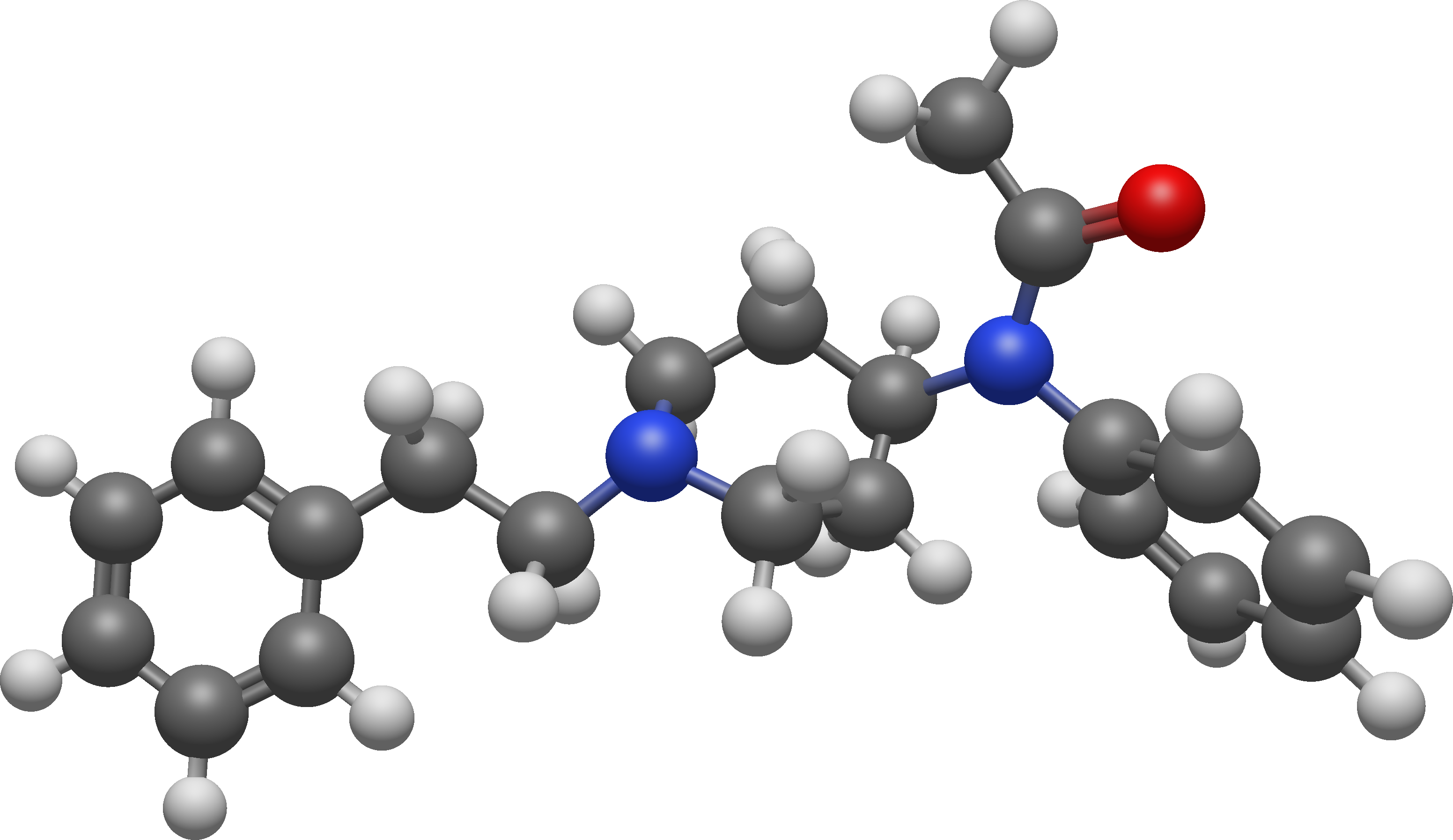

Clinical data
- Routes of administration: Oral, intravenous, intramuscular, insufflation
- ATC code: none

Legal status
- Legal status: AU: Illegal; BR: Class F1 (Prohibited narcotics); CA: Schedule I; DE: Anlage II (Authorized trade only, not prescriptible); UK: Class A; US: Schedule I; Illegal in China, Cyprus, Estonia, Finland, Ireland, Latvia, Lithuania, Norway, Poland, Sweden and Switzerland

Identifiers
- IUPAC name: N-(1-Phenethylpiperidin-4-yl)-N-phenylacetamide
- CAS Number: 3258-84-2
- PubChem CID: 527015
- ChemSpider: 459388
- UNII: 6DZ28538KS
- KEGG: C22756
- ChEBI: CHEBI:233556
- CompTox Dashboard (EPA): DTXSID80186275
- ECHA InfoCard: 100.169.973

Chemical and physical data
- Formula: C_{21}H_{26}N_{2}O
- Molar mass: 322.452 g·mol^{−1}
- 3D model (JSmol): Interactive image
- SMILES: CC(N(C1=CC=CC=C1)C2CCN(CCC3=CC=CC=C3)CC2)=O
- InChI: InChI=1S/C21H26N2O/c1-18(24)23(20-10-6-3-7-11-20)21-13-16-22(17-14-21)15-12-19-8-4-2-5-9-19/h2-11,21H,12-17H2,1H3; Key:FYIUUQUPOKIKNI-UHFFFAOYSA-N

Acetylfentanyl (acetyl fentanyl) is an opioid analgesic drug that is an analog of fentanyl. Studies have estimated acetylfentanyl to be 15 times more potent than morphine, which would mean that despite being somewhat weaker than fentanyl, it is nevertheless still several times stronger than pure heroin. It has never been licensed for medical use and instead has only been sold on the illicit drug market. Acetylfentanyl was discovered at the same time as fentanyl itself and had only rarely been encountered on the illicit market in the late 1980s. However, in 2013, Canadian police seized 3 kilograms of acetylfentanyl. As a μ-opioid receptor agonist, acetylfentanyl may serve as a direct substitute for oxycodone, heroin or other opioids. Common side effects of fentanyl analogs are similar to those of fentanyl itself, which include itching, nausea, and potentially fatal respiratory depression. Fentanyl analogs have killed hundreds of people throughout Europe and the former Soviet republics since the most recent resurgence in use began in Estonia in the early 2000s, and novel derivatives continue to appear.

== Deaths ==
=== Europe ===
Acetylfentanyl has been analytically confirmed in 32 fatalities in four European member states between 2013 and August 2015, Germany (2), Poland (1), Sweden (27), and the United Kingdom (2).

=== Russia ===
Twelve deaths have been associated with acetylfentanyl in Russia since 2012.

=== United States ===
The Centers for Disease Control and Prevention (CDC) issued a health alert to report that between March 2013 and May 2013, 14 overdose deaths related to injected acetylfentanyl had occurred among intravenous drug users (ages between 19 and 57 years) in Rhode Island. After confirming five overdoses in one county, including a fatality, Pennsylvania asked coroners and medical examiners across the state to screen for acetylfentanyl. As a result of this investigation, Pennsylvania confirmed at least one acetylfentanyl overdose death and attributed at least 50 fatalities to either fentanyl or acetylfentanyl during the first half of 2013. In July 2015, the DEA informed about 52 confirmed fatalities involving acetylfentanyl in the United States between 2013 and 2015.

=== Japan ===
One fatal poisoning caused by intravenous injection of a "bath salt" product containing acetylfentanyl mixed with 4'-Methoxy-α-pyrrolidinopentiophenone (a substituted cathinone) has been reported in 2016.

== Legal status ==
=== Canada ===
As an analog of fentanyl, acetylfentanyl is a Schedule I controlled drug.

=== China ===
As of October 2015, acetylfentanyl is a controlled substance in China.

=== United States ===
Acetylfentanyl is a Schedule I controlled substance as of May 2015.

=== Switzerland ===
As of March 2023, acetylfentanyl is a controlled substance in Switzerland.

=== United Kingdom ===
Acetylfentanyl was made a class A drug as an analogue of fentanyl in 1986.

== Overdose ==
Acetylfentanyl overdosage has been reported to closely resemble heroin overdosage clinically. Additionally, while naloxone (Narcan) is effective in treating acetylfentanyl overdose, larger than normal doses of the antidote may be required.

=== Detection in body fluids ===
Acetylfentanyl may be quantitated in blood, plasma, or urine by liquid chromatography-mass spectrometry to confirm a diagnosis of poisoning in hospitalized patients or to provide evidence in a medicolegal death investigation. Postmortem peripheral blood acetylfentanyl concentrations have been in a range of 89–945 μg/L in victims of acute overdosage.

== See also ==
- 3-Methylbutyrfentanyl
- 3-Methylfentanyl
- 4-Fluorofentanyl
- α-Methylfentanyl
- Butyrfentanyl
- Furanylfentanyl
- Homofentanyl
- List of fentanyl analogues
