= Benzylfentanyl =

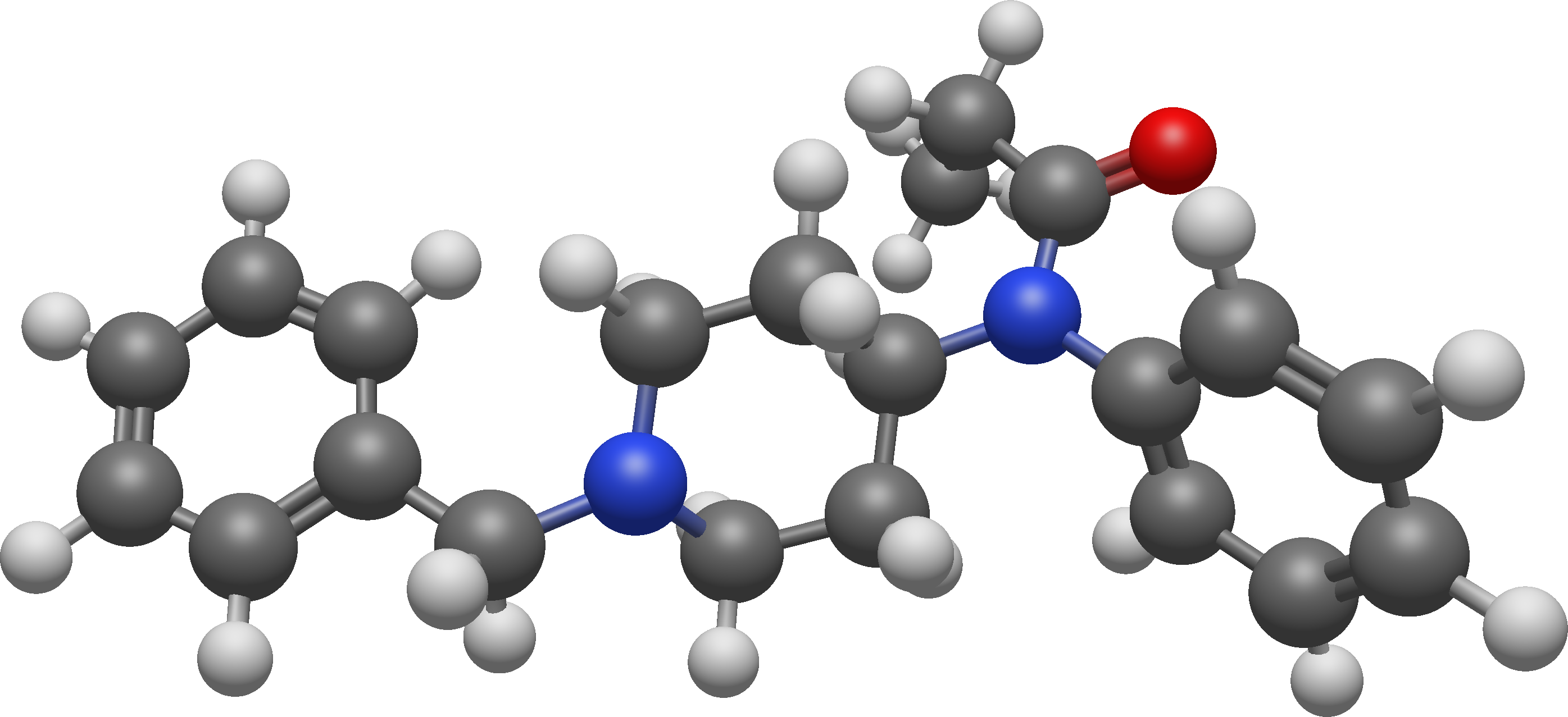

Names
- Preferred IUPAC name N-(1-Benzylpiperidin-4-yl)-N-phenylpropanamide

Identifiers
CAS Number	1474-02-8
3D model (JSmol)	Interactive image
ChemSpider	220920
ECHA InfoCard	100.014.559
EC Number	216-014-7
PubChem CID	252141
UNII	9BV2D1A57H
CompTox Dashboard (EPA)	DTXSID00163705
- InChI: InChI=1S/C21H26N2O/c1-2-21(24)23(19-11-7-4-8-12-19)20-13-15-22(16-14-20)17-18-9-5-3-6-10-18/h3-12,20H,2,13-17H2,1H3 Key: POQDXIFVWVZVML-UHFFFAOYSA-N
- SMILES: CCC(=O)N(C1CCN(CC1)CC2=CC=CC=C2)C3=CC=CC=C3

Properties
Chemical formula	C_{21}H_{26}N_{2}O
Molar mass	322.452 g·mol^{−1}
Density	1.113 g/cm^{3}
Boiling point	502.2 °C (936.0 °F; 775.3 K)
Vapor pressure	3.36×10^{−8} mmHg
Legal status	DE: Anlage I (Authorized scientific use only); US: List I (a precursor)

Hazards
- GHS labelling
Pictograms	(GHS06: Toxic)
Signal word	Danger
Hazard statements	H301, H412
Precautionary statements	P264, P270, P273, P301+P316, P321, P330, P405, P501
NFPA 704 (fire diamond)	3 0 0
Flash point	257.5 °C (495.5 °F; 530.6 K)
- Lethal dose or concentration (LD, LC)
LD_{50} (median dose)	500 mg/kg (oral, as HCl salt, est.)
Safety data sheet (SDS)	CATO Research Chemicals
- Except where otherwise noted, data are given for materials in their standard state (at 25 °C [77 °F], 100 kPa). Infobox references

Benzylfentanyl (R-4129) is a fentanyl analog. It was temporarily placed in the US Schedule I by emergency scheduling in 1985 due to concerns about its potential for abuse as a designer drug, but this placement was allowed to expire and benzylfentanyl was formally removed from controlled substance listing in 2010, after the DEA's testing determined it to be "essentially inactive" as an opioid. It was added as a List I precursor instead in 2020 after it was determined that it was being used in fentanyl manufacture, which was previously thought to be beyond the technical capability of illicit labs. Benzylfentanyl has a K_{i} of 213 nM at the mu opioid receptor, binding around 1/200 as strong as fentanyl itself, though it is still slightly more potent than codeine.

== See also ==
- Homofentanyl
- Isofentanyl
