= Big dynorphin =

Opioid peptide

Names
- IUPAC name L-tyrosyl-glycyl-glycyl-L-phenylalanyl-L-leucyl-L-arginyl-L-arginyl-L-isoleucyl-L-arginyl-L-prolyl-L-lysyl-L-leucyl-L-lysyl-L-tryptophyl-L-alpha-aspartyl-L-asparagyl-L-glutaminyl-L-lysyl-L-arginyl-L-tyrosyl-glycyl-glycyl-L-phenylalanyl-L-leucyl-L-arginyl-L-arginyl-L-glutaminyl-L-phenylalanyl-L-lysyl-L-valyl-L-valyl-L-threonine
- Other names: big dyn; GTPL3669; Dynorphin (1-32); Dynorphin-32; Dynorphin(1-32)

Identifiers
CAS Number	83328-95-4
3D model (JSmol)	Interactive image
ChemSpider	17289010
PubChem CID	16132351
- InChI: InChI=1S/C185H292N58O41/c1-14-104(12)150(241-164(268)125(57-38-80-210-184(202)203)222-156(260)123(55-36-78-208-182(198)199)226-167(271)131(85-101(6)7)233-168(272)133(87-106-41-18-15-19-42-106)217-145(252)97-213-143(250)95-215-152(256)115(190)86-109-60-64-112(245)65-61-109)177(281)230-128(58-39-81-211-185(204)205)178(282)243-82-40-59-139(243)174(278)229-119(51-28-32-74-188)159(263)231-129(83-99(2)3)165(269)223-118(50-27-31-73-187)158(262)236-136(91-111-94-212-116-48-25-24-47-114(111)116)171(275)238-138(93-147(254)255)173(277)237-137(92-142(193)249)172(276)228-126(68-70-140(191)247)161(265)219-117(49-26-30-72-186)154(258)221-124(56-37-79-209-183(200)201)160(264)234-132(90-110-62-66-113(246)67-63-110)153(257)216-96-144(251)214-98-146(253)218-134(88-107-43-20-16-21-44-107)169(273)232-130(84-100(4)5)166(270)225-122(54-35-77-207-181(196)197)155(259)220-121(53-34-76-206-180(194)195)157(261)227-127(69-71-141(192)248)162(266)235-135(89-108-45-22-17-23-46-108)170(274)224-120(52-29-33-75-189)163(267)239-148(102(8)9)175(279)240-149(103(10)11)176(280)242-151(105(13)244)179(283)284/h15-25,41-48,60-67,94,99-105,115,117-139,148-151,212,244-246H,14,26-40,49-59,68-93,95-98,186-190H2,1-13H3,(H2,191,247)(H2,192,248)(H2,193,249)(H,213,250)(H,214,251)(H,215,256)(H,216,257)(H,217,252)(H,218,253)(H,219,265)(H,220,259)(H,221,258)(H,222,260)(H,223,269)(H,224,274)(H,225,270)(H,226,271)(H,227,261)(H,228,276)(H,229,278)(H,230,281)(H,231,263)(H,232,273)(H,233,272)(H,234,264)(H,235,266)(H,236,262)(H,237,277)(H,238,275)(H,239,267)(H,240,279)(H,241,268)(H,242,280)(H,254,255)(H,283,284)(H4,194,195,206)(H4,196,197,207)(H4,198,199,208)(H4,200,201,209)(H4,202,203,210)(H4,204,205,211)/t104-,105+,115-,117-,118-,119-,120-,121-,122-,123-,124-,125-,126-,127-,128-,129-,130-,131-,132-,133-,134-,135-,136-,137-,138-,139-,148-,149-,150-,151-/m0/s1 Key: VPZXNPNLCOYTOT-MBGMINRZSA-N
- SMILES: Isomeric SMILES CC[C@H](C)[C@@H](C(=O)N[C@@H](CCCNC(=N)N)C(=O)N1CCC[C@H]1C(=O)N[C@@H](CCCCN)C(=O)N[C@@H](CC(C)C)C(=O)N[C@@H](CCCCN)C(=O)N[C@@H](CC2=CNC3=CC=CC=C32)C(=O)N[C@@H](CC(=O)O)C(=O)N[C@@H](CC(=O)N)C(=O)N[C@@H](CCC(=O)N)C(=O)N[C@@H](CCCCN)C(=O)N[C@@H](CCCNC(=N)N)C(=O)N[C@@H](CC4=CC=C(C=C4)O)C(=O)NCC(=O)NCC(=O)N[C@@H](CC5=CC=CC=C5)C(=O)N[C@@H](CC(C)C)C(=O)N[C@@H](CCCNC(=N)N)C(=O)N[C@@H](CCCNC(=N)N)C(=O)N[C@@H](CCC(=O)N)C(=O)N[C@@H](CC6=CC=CC=C6)C(=O)N[C@@H](CCCCN)C(=O)N[C@@H](C(C)C)C(=O)N[C@@H](C(C)C)C(=O)N[C@@H]([C@@H](C)O)C(=O)O)NC(=O)[C@H](CCCNC(=N)N)NC(=O)[C@H](CCCNC(=N)N)NC(=O)[C@H](CC(C)C)NC(=O)[C@H](CC7=CC=CC=C7)NC(=O)CNC(=O)CNC(=O)[C@H](CC8=CC=C(C=C8)O)N

Properties
Chemical formula	C_{185}H_{292}N_{58}O_{41}
Molar mass	3985
- Except where otherwise noted, data are given for materials in their standard state (at 25 °C [77 °F], 100 kPa). Infobox references

Big dynorphin is an endogenous opioid peptide of the dynorphin family. It forms when a precursor protein prodynorphin is not fully processed, resulting in a 32-amino acid molecule containing both dynorphin A and dynorphin B sequences. It has the amino acid sequence: Tyr-Gly-Gly-Phe-Leu-Arg-Arg-Ile-Arg-Pro-Lys-Leu-Lys-Trp-Asp-Asn-Gln-Lys-Arg-Tyr-Gly-Gly-Phe-Leu-Arg-Arg-Gln-Phe-Lys-Val-Val-Thr.

Big dynorphin is a highly efficiacious principal endogenous agonist at the human κ-opioid receptor (KOR). It produces one of the strongest responses at GPR139 receptor among dynorphins. Additionally, it uniquely modulates NMDA receptor and potentiates acid-sensing ion channel 1a (ASIC1a).

It plays a role in pain and stress responses. It exhibits both analgesic and pro-nociceptive properties. In mice it modulates memory and learning, and has anxiolytic properties, contributing to homeostatic regulation of opioid signaling in the central nervous system.

== Fragments ==
Big dynorphin_{1-32} is the primary endogenously documented big dynorphin form, but various shorter big dynorphin fragments have been synthesized for research purposes. These include (2-32), (2-26), (9-19) forms.

== Synthesis ==
Big dynorphin is generated through the proteolytic processing of prodynorphin (PDYN), a 26-kilodalton precursor protein by proprotein convertase 1. The synthesis occurs within the neuronal cell body through translation of prodynorphin mRNA. Following translation, prodynorphin undergoes sequential processing by proprotein convertases, primarily PC1/3 and PC2, as well as the cysteine protease cathepsin L.

Under normal circumstances, in the presence of carboxypeptidase E, prodynorphin is fully processed by sequential cleavage at dibasic amino acid sites to generate individual dynorphin peptides: dynorphin A_{1-17}, dynorphin B, and α-neoendorphin. Big dynorphin forms when this proteolytic processing is incomplete, typically resulting from insufficient proprotein convertase activity or altered intracellular calcium levels during neurotransmitter release events. The 32-amino acid peptide comprises the complete dynorphin A sequence (residues 1-17) joined to the complete dynorphin B sequence, with two C-terminal amino acids.

=== Release mechanism ===
Peptide's release occurs primarily in a calcium-dependent manner through exocytosis of large dense core vesicles in the presynaptic terminal. Big dynorphin immunoreactivity has been detected in regions such as the nucleus accumbens, caudate nucleus, and hippocampus, with significant levels detected in cerebrospinal fluid. The ratio of big dynorphin to dynorphin B in human brain tissue is approximately 1:3.

== Pharmacology ==
=== Opioid receptors ===
Big dynorphin activities
Target	Affinity (K_{i}, nM)
KOR	0.198 (K_{i}); 0.741 (EC_{50}); 159% (E_{max})
MOR	14 (K_{i}); 87 (EC_{50}); 115% (E_{max})
DOR	43 (K_{i}); 119 (EC_{50}); 100% (E_{max})
NOP	105
ASIC1	26-211 (EC_{50})
Notes: The smaller the value, the more avidly the drug interacts with the site. Max. stimulation is shown as percentage of that induced by dyn A_{1-17} Sources:

Big dynorphin acts as a potent full agonist at the human κ-opioid receptor (KOR), exhibiting extremely high relative efficacy at this target. In one binding assay it demonstrated similar affinity to dynorphin A, but about 14 to 32-fold higher potency to activate G proteins than other dynorphin peptides. In contrast, other studies have suggested similar or higher potencies of other dynorphins.

The peptide is also an agonist of other opioid receptors, It is 70-fold selective towards KOR over μ-opioid receptors (MOR) and 200 over δ-opioid receptor (DOR).

In older guinea-pig ileum bioassay measuring native receptor function, big dynorphin shows approximately 10-20-fold reduced potency relative to dynorphin A, possibly due to conformational constraints of the larger peptide affecting receptor binding in peripheral tissue. This discrepancy suggests that big dynorphin's efficacy in human KOR systems may not translate directly to potency in peripheral tissue.

Big dynorphin could theoretically produce some of the classical pharmacological effects associated with KOR agonism such as dysphoria, dissociation, and sedation, but this has not been directly evaluated. Similarly biased signaling of big dynorphin at KOR has not yet been assessed.

=== GPR139 receptor ===
Big dynorphin is one of the activators of the GPR139, a G protein-coupled receptor (GPCR), recently deorphanized as a dynorphin receptor. In a wide neuropeptide library screen it exhibited one of the highest efficacies among prodynorphin-derived peptides.

At low concentrations, dynorphins predominantly activate canonical opioid receptors (KOR, MOR, DOR), while at higher concentrations, they additionally recruit GPR139. This receptor couples to G_{q/11} G protein-mediated signaling, which is mechanistically opposite to the G_{i/o} inhibitory signaling of classical opioid receptors. This permits GPR139 to function as a molecular homeostatic brake: when dynorphin reaches high concentrations during intense stress or pain, simultaneous GPR139 activation counteracts excessive opioid receptor signaling through excitatory signaling pathways, preventing pathological over-inhibition of neuronal activity.

=== NMDA receptor ===
NMDA receptors are modulated by big dynorphin, producing effects that are antagonist-insensitive to opioid receptor blockade. Intracerebroventricular injection of big dynorphin produced memory enhancement in passive avoidance tests, enhanced locomotor activity in the open field test, and anxiolytic-like effects that were blocked by the NMDA receptor antagonist MK-801 but resistant to nor-BNI, a selective KOR antagonist.

In contrast, dynorphin A and dynorphin B at similar doses produced analgesia (mediated by opioid receptors) but did not produce the NMDA-dependent memory enhancement, anxiolysis, or locomotor stimulation.

Suggested mechanisms are interaction with the polyamine binding site or the NR2B subunit. The molecular basis for this atypical activity may involve the extended C-terminal region unique to big dynorphin, which contains multiple basic residues (arginine and lysine).

=== ASIC1a channel ===
Big dynorphin is a potent endogenous modulator of the acid-sensing ion channel 1a (ASIC1a) and current rescue following steady-state desensitization. In comparison, dynorphin A exhibits a approximately 1000-fold lower potency than big dynorphin at this target.

Peptide potentiates ASIC1a current through a mechanism independent of both opioid and bradykinin receptor signaling. The potency correlates with big dynorphin's features, particularly its high net positive charge (9+) and abundance of arginine residues (6 total), with residues Arg6, Arg7. Big dynorphin rescues proton-gated currents and promotes acidosis-induced neuronal cell death in cultured cortical neurons, implicating it in pathological conditions involving cellular acidification and excitotoxicity.

== Functions and effects ==
=== Pain modulation ===
Like other dynorphin peptides, big dynorphin can produce analgesic effects through κ-opioid receptor (KOR) activation at spinal nociceptive sites. However, at supraspinal levels through non-opioid mechanisms involving NMDA receptor modulation and ASIC1a activation, big dynorphin can produce pro-nociceptive effects, enhancing pain sensitivity in both acute and chronic pain states.

=== Memory and learning ===
It has been shown that big dynorphin enhances learning in rodent models through NMDA receptor modulation. This contrasts with the amnestic effects typically associated with opioid receptor agonists and other dynorphins. The mechanism may involve modulation of the NR2B subunit, a modulator of cortical synaptic plasticity and long-term potentiation (LTP).

== Clinical significance ==
=== Neurodegeneration and chronic pain ===
Big dynorphin is upregulated in spinal cord injury and chronic pain states, where excessive big dynorphin production through both opioid and non-opioid receptor mechanisms contribute to neuronal death, neuroinflammation, and pain chronification.

=== Alzheimer's Disease ===
In contrary, big dynorphin exhibits neuroprotective properties against amyloid-β (Aβ) accumulation in Alzheimer's disease. It reduces the hydrophobicity and slows the aggregation kinetics of Aβ_{40}, the most abundant amyloid species, resulting in around 2-fold reduction in amyloid aggregation compared to Aβ alone. In human neuroblastoma cell cultures, big dynorphin pre-incubated with Aβ_{40} significantly increased cell viability to compared to Aβ_{40} alone. The neuroprotective mechanism involves big dynorphin's cationic amino acid residues stabilizing negatively charged regions of Aβ, preventing the β-sheet transition and maintaining Aβ in an α-helical conformation. These findings suggest therapeutic potential for big dynorphin-derived peptides in Alzheimer's disease treatment.

== See also ==
- Dynorphin
- κ-opioid receptor
- GPR139
- Prodynorphin
- Opioid peptides
