= Opioid food peptides =

Opioid food peptides are opioid peptides found naturally in food. They include:

- Casomorphin (from milk)
- Gluten exorphin (from gluten)
- Gliadorphin/gluteomorphin (from gluten)
- Rubiscolin (from spinach)
- Soymorphin-5 (from soy)
- Oryzatensin (from rice)

There are various foods that provide an exogenous source of opioid peptides. Exogenous means coming from outside the body. There are also endogenous opioids peptides that are produced from within the human body. Exogenous opioid peptides are bioactive compounds similar in structure to endogenous opioids, and because of their similar structure, they are recognized by the brain's opioid receptors. Endogenous opioid peptides are a type of endorphin, while Exogenous opioid peptides are referred to as exorphines. Again, the “ex-” in exorphines means that it comes from outside the body. Dietary sources of opioid peptides are metabolized through digestion and absorbed by the small intestines. Once these molecules enter the bloodstream, they permeate the blood-brain barrier and are influential upon the central nervous system. The opioid receptor pathways affect various processes in the brains of humans and of other animals. They are an essential part of daily functioning and wellbeing. During the critical early developmental period, a primary source of opioid peptides is gained from breast milk.

Having too much or too little opioid peptides in the brain can lead to dysfunction or disease. Because exogenous opioid peptides come from food, we have some ability to modulate the quantity and types of these peptides by altering our diet.

One example for where opioid food peptides have shown to be clinically significant is with autism spectrum disorder. There is evidence to suggest that autism spectrum disorder severity is partially influenced by an overaccumulation of the opioid peptides gluteomorphin and caseomorphin from incomplete metabolization of gluten and casein. In response to these findings, eliminating sources of gluteomorphin and caseomorphin from the diet could be therapeutically beneficial. A gluten free, casein free diet is one of the most popular ways of using diet as a management for autism spectrum disorder symptoms. Gluten is most often found in wheat, and casein is found in dairy products like milk and cheese. While the support for this theory is promising, further studies are needed to determine the efficacy of the gluten free, casein free diet for autism spectrum disorder.
