= GNTI =

GNTI may refer to:

- 5'-Guanidinonaltrindole
- 6'-Guanidinonaltrindole
- A-1,3-mannosyl-glycoprotein 2-b-N-acetylglucosaminyltransferase, an enzyme
