= Exorphin =

Exorphins are exogenous opioid peptides, distinguished from endorphins, or endogenous opioid peptides.

Exorphins include opioid food peptides like gluten exorphin and microbial opioid peptides and any other opioid peptide foreign to a host that have metabolic efficacy for that host. Exorphins can be converted from plants and animals but also dairy products and certain vegetables like spinach and soy.

Exorphins can be released for many different kinds of proteins and thus can be isolated from various sources such as from plant proteins or from enzymes of the digestive system of animals. The study of exorphins as a bioactive peptide can be a source of discovery for new kinds of food and drugs to treat and prevent diseases associated with the accumulation of exorphins.

== Effect on central nervous system ==
Opioid receptors, located in both the central nervous system as well as peripheral tissues, play a vital role in regulating numerous physiological functions. Many of these functions are influenced by exorphins. To impact the central nervous system, exorphins bind to opioid receptors, thereby regulating neuronal communication. This binding affects pain perception, emotions, mood, memory, and more. The influence of exorphins on brain function suggests that exogenous opioid peptides may cross the blood-brain barrier. This understanding of how endorphins enter through blood and end up affecting brain functions could pave the way for the development of new treatment strategies.

== Effect on gastrointestinal system ==
Aside from the central nervous system, exorphins also affect the gastrointestinal system. As mentioned earlier, exorphins are peptides that are derived from food. There are different types of exorphins such as gluten exorphins (gluten), casomorphins (milk), and many other types of exorphins from various sources. Depending on the type of source, they hold a different effect upon the body--some foods affect functions such as appetite, release of hormones, production of mucus, and more. For instance, casomorphins regulate motility, secretion of hormones, and immune responses.

== Connection and treatment of autism ==
Effective therapies to manage autism remain scarce. According to the exorphin theory of autism, an increase in the levels of exorphin is linked to symptoms of autism. Based on this concept, experiments have attempted to reduce the symptoms of autism by using large amounts of protease to break down exorphins before they are absorbed. Experiments have also attempted to enhance and utilize enzymes existing in the gut to break down exorphins in a similar fashion, since the production of exorphins within the gut is inevitable.

== Connection with schizophrenia ==
Exorphins can cause various symptoms of schizophrenia if mutation occurs at a few selected loci. Genetic mutation at one of these loci can lead to increased absorption of exorphins via receptor mediated endocytosis. Another possibility from these particular loci is that catabolization of exorphins can be disrupted thus allowing the exorphin to persist in the body. This would lead to exorphins entering the brain capillary, bypassing the blood brain barrier, and inflicting negative repercussion on the brain. This does not mean that exorphin will necessarily cause schizophrenia, as susceptibility to the disease is dependent on an individual's genetic makeup. However, by increasing the probability that exorphins enter the brain, it will also increase the chance of an individual displaying schizophrenic symptoms.

== Connection with celiac disease ==
Celiac disease (CD) is a chronic autoimmune disorder that damages the small intestine. In turn, the body is unable to absorb nutrients from food. The gastrointestinal issues that usually come along with CD includes abdominal pain, bloating, as well as other symptoms. When patients do not show any symptoms but are affected by CD, they have asymptomatic celiac disease (ACD). According to research, there are links between an intake in gluten and ACD. The intake in gluten results in more exorphins in the body, which results in ACD. Often, patients with ACD also have other disorders such as diabetes mellitus I, autism, schizophrenia, depression, and several others. This indicates that there is a high chance that the other disorders are also associated with the increase of gluten exorphins.
