= Opioid peptide =

Class of peptides that bind to opioid receptors

Vertebrate endogenous opioids neuropeptide

Identifiers
- Symbol: Opiods_neuropep
- Pfam: PF01160
- InterPro: IPR006024
- PROSITE: PDOC00964
Available protein structures:
- PDB: IPR006024 PF01160 (ECOD; PDBsum)
- AlphaFold: IPR006024; PF01160

Structural correlation between met-enkephalin, an opioid peptide (left), and morphine, an opiate drug (right)

Opioid peptides or opiate peptides are peptides that bind to opioid receptors in the brain; opiates and opioids mimic the effect of these peptides. Such peptides may be produced by the body itself, for example endorphins. The effects of these peptides vary, but they all resemble those of opiates. Brain opioid peptide systems are known to play an important role in motivation, emotion, attachment behaviour, the response to stress and pain, control of food intake, and the rewarding effects of alcohol and nicotine.

Opioid-like peptides may also be absorbed from partially digested food (casomorphins, exorphins, and rubiscolins). Opioid peptides from food typically have lengths between 4–8 amino acids. Endogenous opioids are generally much longer.

Opioid peptides are released by post-translational proteolytic cleavage of precursor proteins. The precursors consist of the following components: a signal sequence that precedes a conserved region of about 50 residues; a variable-length region; and the sequence of the neuropeptides themselves. Sequence analysis reveals that the conserved N-terminal region of the precursors contains 6 cysteines, which are probably involved in disulfide bond formation. It is speculated that this region might be important for neuropeptide processing.

== Endogenous ==
The human genome contains several homologous genes that are known to code for endogenous opioid peptides.

- The nucleotide sequence of the human gene for proopiomelanocortin (POMC) was characterized in 1980. The POMC gene codes for endogenous opioids such as β-endorphin and γ-endorphin.
- The human gene for the enkephalins was isolated and its sequence described in 1982.
- The human gene for dynorphins (originally called the "Enkephalin B" gene because of sequence similarity to the enkephalin gene) was isolated and its sequence described in 1983.
- The PNOC gene encoding prepronociceptin, which is cleaved into nociceptin and potentially two additional neuropeptides.
- Adrenorphin, amidorphin, and leumorphin were discovered in the 1980s.
- The endomorphins were discovered in the 1990s.
- Opiorphin and spinorphin, enkephalinase inhibitors (i.e., prevent the metabolism of enkephalins).
- Hemorphins, hemoglobin-derived opioid peptides, including hemorphin-4, valorphin, and spinorphin, among others.

While not peptides, codeine and morphine are also produced in the human body.

Endogenous opioid peptides and their receptors
Opioid peptide	Amino acid sequence	Opioid receptor target(s)	References
Enkephalins			
Leu-enkephalin	YGGFL	δ-opioid receptor^{†}, μ-opioid receptor^{†}	
Met-enkephalin	YGGFM	δ-opioid receptor^{†}, μ-opioid receptor^{†}	
Metorphamide	YGGFMRRV-NH_{2}	δ-opioid receptor, μ-opioid receptor	
Peptide E	YGGFMRRVGRPEWWMDYQKRYGGFL	μ-opioid receptor, κ-opioid receptor	
Endorphins			
α-Endorphin	YGGFMTSEKSQTPLVT	μ-opioid receptor, unknown affinity for other opioid receptors	
β-Endorphin	YGGFMTSEKSQTPLVTLFKNAIIKNAYKKGE	μ-opioid receptor^{†‡}, δ-opioid receptor^{†}	
γ-Endorphin	YGGFMTSEKSQTPLVTL	μ-opioid receptor, unknown affinity for other opioid receptors	
Dynorphins			
Dynorphin A	YGGFLRRIRPKLKWDNQ	κ-opioid receptor^{†‡}	
Dynorphin A_{1–8}	YGGFLRRI	κ-opioid receptor, μ-opioid receptor (partial agonist at δ-opioid receptor)	
Dynorphin B	YGGFLRRQFKVVT	κ-opioid receptor	
Big dynorphin	YGGFLRRIRPKLKWDNQKRYGGFLRRQFKVVT	κ-opioid receptor^{†‡}	
Leumorphin	YGGFLRRQFKVVTRSQEDPNAYYEELFDV	κ-opioid receptor	
α-Neoendorphin	YGGFLRKYPK	κ-opioid receptor	
β-Neoendorphin	YGGFLRKYP	κ-opioid receptor	
Nociceptin			
Nociceptin	FGGFTGARKSARKLANQ	nociceptin receptor^{†‡}	
Endomorphins			
Endomorphin-1	YPWF-NH_{2}	μ-opioid receptor	
Endomorphin-2	YPFF-NH_{2}	μ-opioid receptor	
^{†} This symbol next to a receptor indicates that the corresponding peptide is a principal endogenous agonist of the receptor in humans.^{‡} This symbol next to a receptor indicates that the corresponding peptide is the endogenous ligand with the highest known potency for the receptor in humans.

== Exogenous ==
Exogenous opioid substances are called exorphins, as opposed to endorphins. Exorphins include opioid food peptides, such as gluten exorphin and casomorphin, and are often contained in cereals and animal milk. Exorphins mimic the actions of endorphins by binding to and activating opioid receptors in the brain.

Common exorphins include:

- Casomorphin (from casein found in milk of mammals, including cows and humans)
- Gluten exorphin (from gluten found in cereals wheat, rye, barley), including:
  - Gliadorphin/gluteomorphin
- Soymorphin-5 (from soybean)
- Rubiscolin (from spinach)

== Amphibian ==
- Deltorphin
- Deltorphin I
- Deltorphin II
- Dermorphin

== Synthetic ==
- Zyklophin – semisynthetic KOR antagonist derived from dynorphin A
