= C27H29N5O3 =

The molecular formula C_{27}H_{29}N_{5}O_{3} (molar mass: 471.55 g/mol) may refer to:

- 5'-Guanidinonaltrindole (5'-GNTI)
- 6'-Guanidinonaltrindole (6'-GNTI)
- Zanubrutinib
