= Cryptide =

Bioactive peptide released by proteolysis of another protein

A cryptide, also known as cryptein or cryptic peptide, is a bioactive peptide produced by proteolytic cleavage of a larger precursor protein, whose biological activity is distinct from that of the parent protein. Cryptides are involved in the modulation of a variety of biological processes, including neuronal signaling, angiogenesis, immune and inflammatory responses, and cell growth. These peptides have attracted some interest in pharmacological research.

== Terminology ==
The term cryptide refers to a bioactive peptide produced by proteolytic cleavage of a larger precursor protein, while crypteins are cryptic proteins generated through similar mechanisms. Cryptides are conceptually part of the broader "cryptome", a subset of the proteome composed of proteins that can yield bioactive fragments upon fragmentation. Their study en mass is known as cryptomics.

== Examples ==
Examples of cryptides include:

- Lactoferricin, an antimicrobial peptide released from lactoferrin by pepsin.
- Hemorphins, opioid peptides derived from hemoglobin.
- Hemopressins, cannabinoid system modulating peptides obscured in hemoglobin.
- Casomorphins, opioid peptides obscured in casein.
- Mitocryptide-1, a neutrophil-activating peptide derived from cytochrome c oxidase subunit VIII.
- Mitocryptide-2, another neutrophil-activating peptide, hidden in cytochrome b.

== See also ==
- Zymogen
- Proteose
- Proteolysis
- Neuropeptide
