= Endomorphin-1 =

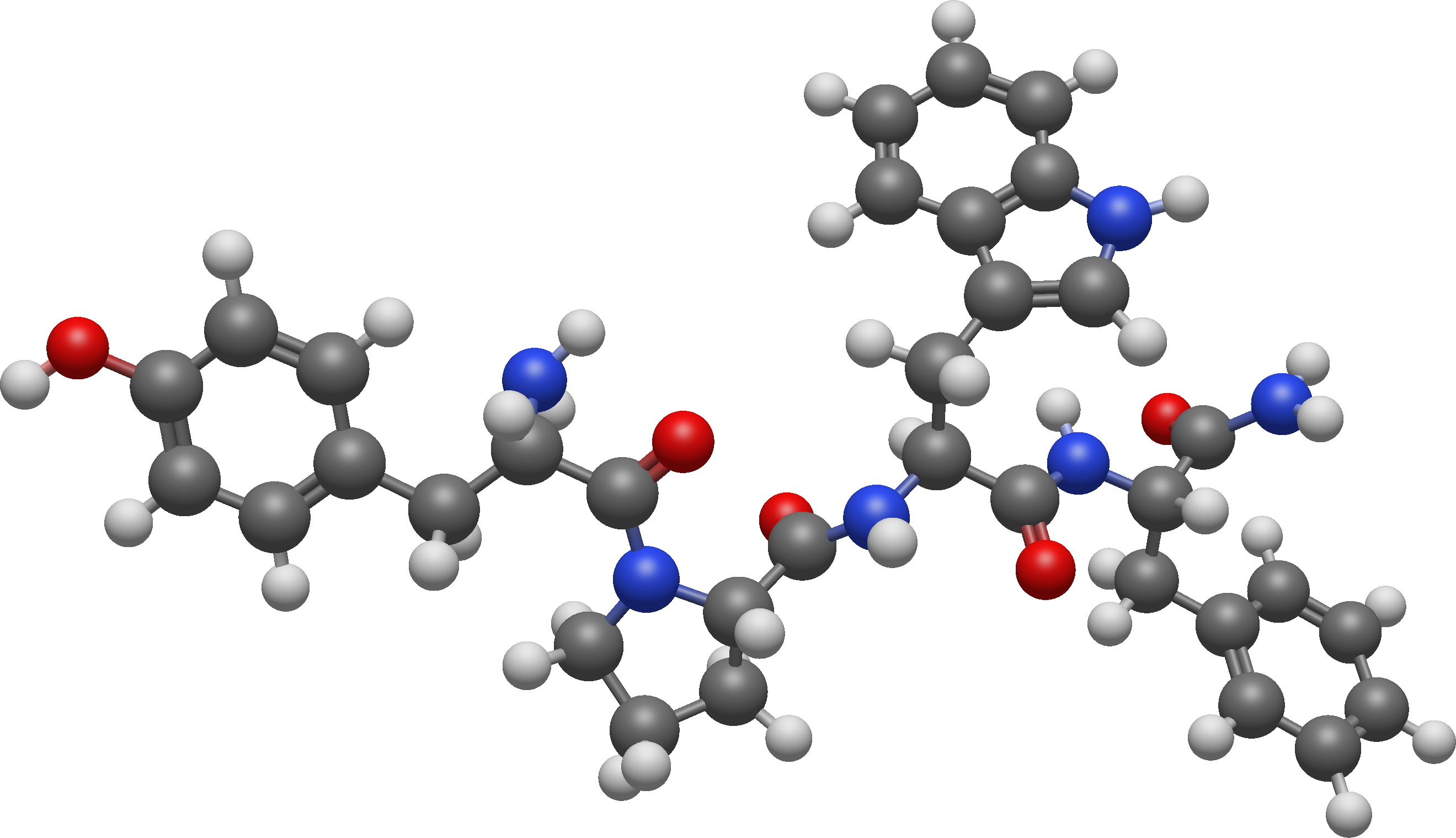

Names
- IUPAC name L-Tyrosyl-L-prolyl-L-tryptophyl-L-phenylalaninamide

Identifiers
CAS Number	189388-22-5
3D model (JSmol)	Interactive image
ChemSpider	4470614
IUPHAR/BPS	1623
PubChem CID	5311080e
CompTox Dashboard (EPA)	DTXSID10415505
- InChI: InChI=1S/C34H38N6O5/c35-26(17-22-12-14-24(41)15-13-22)34(45)40-16-6-11-30(40)33(44)39-29(19-23-20-37-27-10-5-4-9-25(23)27)32(43)38-28(31(36)42)18-21-7-2-1-3-8-21/h1-5,7-10,12-15,20,26,28-30,37,41H,6,11,16-19,35H2,(H2,36,42)(H,38,43)(H,39,44)/t26-,28-,29-,30-/m0/s1 Key: ZEXLJFNSKAHNFH-SYKYGTKKSA-N; InChI=1/C34H38N6O5/c35-26(17-22-12-14-24(41)15-13-22)34(45)40-16-6-11-30(40)33(44)39-29(19-23-20-37-27-10-5-4-9-25(23)27)32(43)38-28(31(36)42)18-21-7-2-1-3-8-21/h1-5,7-10,12-15,20,26,28-30,37,41H,6,11,16-19,35H2,(H2,36,42)(H,38,43)(H,39,44)/t26-,28-,29-,30-/m0/s1 Key: ZEXLJFNSKAHNFH-SYKYGTKKBN
- SMILES: c1ccc(cc1)C[C@@H](C(=O)N)NC(=O)[C@H](Cc2c[nH]c3c2cccc3)NC(=O)[C@@H]4CCCN4C(=O)[C@H](Cc5ccc(cc5)O)N

Properties
Chemical formula	C_{34}H_{38}N_{6}O_{5}
Molar mass	610.715 g·mol^{−1}
- Except where otherwise noted, data are given for materials in their standard state (at 25 °C [77 °F], 100 kPa). Infobox references

Endomorphin-1 (EM-1) (amino acid sequence Tyr-Pro-Trp-Phe-NH_{2}) is an endogenous opioid peptide and one of the two endomorphins. It is a high affinity, highly selective agonist of the μ-opioid receptor, and along with endomorphin-2 (EM-2), has been proposed to be the actual endogenous ligand of the μ-receptor. EM-1 produces analgesia in animals and is equipotent with morphine in this regard. The gene encoding for EM-1 has not yet been identified, and it has been suggested that endomorphins could be synthesized by an enzymatic, non-ribosomal mechanism.

By combining N-terminal guadino modifications, a new class of endonmorphin-1 was synthesized, the range of their bioactivities were measured by radioligand binding assay in order to conclude its potency as an opioid. Endomorphin-1 has high affinity and specificity for opioid receptors for behavioral, physiological and pharmacological assays, it is also a potent analgesic agent which brings effects on cardiovascular, respiratory and gastrointestinal functions as well as in immune system responses. This endogenous opioid peptide can help with neuropathic pain without having the common side effects many neuropathic drugs caused which produces constipation. In an effort to reduce side effects, modifications at its N-terminus by 2-aminodecainoic acid have been explored to improve the drug's metabolic stability and membrane permeability.

== See also ==
- β-Endorphin
