= Guanidinonaltrindole =

Guanidinonaltrindole may refer to:

- 5'-Guanidinonaltrindole, an opoid antagonist
- 6'-Guanidinonaltrindole, an opoid receptor
