= Hemorphin-4 =

Endogenous opioid peptide

Names
- IUPAC name (2S,3R)-2-[[(2S)-2-[[(2S)-1-[(2S)-2-amino-3-(4-hydroxyphenyl)propanoyl]pyrrolidine-2-carbonyl]amino]-3-(1H-indol-3-yl)propanoyl]amino]-3-hydroxybutanoic acid
- Other names L-tyrosyl-L-prolyl-L-tryptophyl-L-threonine

Identifiers
CAS Number	103930-64-9
3D model (JSmol)	Interactive image
ChemSpider	16725618
PubChem CID	128444
CompTox Dashboard (EPA)	DTXSID20908670
- InChI: InChI=1S/C29H35N5O7/c1-16(35)25(29(40)41)33-26(37)23(14-18-15-31-22-6-3-2-5-20(18)22)32-27(38)24-7-4-12-34(24)28(39)21(30)13-17-8-10-19(36)11-9-17/h2-3,5-6,8-11,15-16,21,23-25,31,35-36H,4,7,12-14,30H2,1H3,(H,32,38)(H,33,37)(H,40,41)/t16-,21+,23+,24+,25+/m1/s1 Key: WEGGKZQIJMQCGR-RECQUVTISA-N
- SMILES: C[C@H]([C@@H](C(=O)O)NC(=O)[C@H](Cc1c[nH]c2c1cccc2)NC(=O)[C@@H]3CCCN3C(=O)[C@H](Cc4ccc(cc4)O)N)O

Properties
Chemical formula	C_{29}H_{35}N_{5}O_{7}
Molar mass	565.618 g/mol
- Except where otherwise noted, data are given for materials in their standard state (at 25 °C [77 °F], 100 kPa). Infobox references

Hemorphin-4 is an endogenous opioid peptide of the hemorphin family which possesses antinociceptive properties and is derived from the β-chain of hemoglobin in the bloodstream. It contains a tetrapeptide core with the amino acid sequence Tyr-Pro-Trp-Thr. Hemorphin-4 serves as a opioid receptor ligand that has affinities for the μ-, δ-, and κ-opioid receptors in the same range as the structurally related β-casomorphins, although affinity to the κ-opioid receptor is markedly higher in comparison. It acts as an agonist at these sites. It presents high affinity for other receptors such as angiotensin IV, bombesin subtype 3 (hBRS-3), and the corticotropin releasing factor (CRF). Even though it exhibits lower binding affinity for opioid receptors relative to traditional opioid peptides such as endorphins and enkephalins; it may still influence opioid receptor systems due to its high tissue concentration.

== Therapeutic potentials ==
Hemorphin-4 also has inhibitory effects on angiotensin-converting enzyme (ACE), and as a result, may play a role in the regulation of blood pressure. Notably, inhibition of ACE also reduces enkephalin catabolism. Upon modifications with adamantane and cyclohexane, the Hemorphin-4 analog inhibits insulin-regulated aminopeptidase (IRAP) compared to other angiotensin IV inhibitors, making it a suitable candidate for pain, anxiety, and depression therapies. In binding to the μ-opioid receptor, it has significant seizure-suppressing and pain-relieving properties and reduces involuntary bladder contractions in a similar manner to classic opioids.

== See also ==
- Casomorphin
