= Endomorphin-2 =

Names
- IUPAC name L-Tyrosyl-L-prolyl-L-phenylalanyl-L-phenylalaninamide

Identifiers
CAS Number	141801-26-5
3D model (JSmol)	Interactive image
ChemSpider	4470615
IUPHAR/BPS	3668
PubChem CID	5311081
UNII	3PH5M0466G
CompTox Dashboard (EPA)	DTXSID70415506
- InChI: InChI=1S/C32H37N5O5/c33-25(18-23-13-15-24(38)16-14-23)32(42)37-17-7-12-28(37)31(41)36-27(20-22-10-5-2-6-11-22)30(40)35-26(29(34)39)19-21-8-3-1-4-9-21/h1-6,8-11,13-16,25-28,38H,7,12,17-20,33H2,(H2,34,39)(H,35,40)(H,36,41)/t25-,26-,27-,28-/m0/s1 Key: XIJHWXXXIMEHKW-LJWNLINESA-N; InChI=1/C32H37N5O5/c33-25(18-23-13-15-24(38)16-14-23)32(42)37-17-7-12-28(37)31(41)36-27(20-22-10-5-2-6-11-22)30(40)35-26(29(34)39)19-21-8-3-1-4-9-21/h1-6,8-11,13-16,25-28,38H,7,12,17-20,33H2,(H2,34,39)(H,35,40)(H,36,41)/t25-,26-,27-,28-/m0/s1 Key: XIJHWXXXIMEHKW-LJWNLINEBE
- SMILES: c1ccc(cc1)C[C@@H](C(=O)N)NC(=O)[C@H](Cc2ccccc2)NC(=O)[C@@H]3CCCN3C(=O)[C@H](Cc4ccc(cc4)O)N

Properties
Chemical formula	C_{32}H_{37}N_{5}O_{5}
Molar mass	571.667 g/mol
- Except where otherwise noted, data are given for materials in their standard state (at 25 °C [77 °F], 100 kPa). Infobox references

Endomorphin-2 (EM-2) is an endogenous opioid peptide and one of the two endomorphins. It has the amino acid sequence Tyr-Pro-Phe-Phe-NH_{2}. It is a high affinity, highly selective agonist of the μ-opioid receptor, and along with endomorphin-1 (EM-1), has been proposed to be the actual endogenous ligand of this receptor (that is, rather than the endorphins). Like EM-1, EM-2 produces analgesia in animals, but whereas EM-1 is more prevalent in the brain, EM-2 is more prevalent in the spinal cord. In addition, the action of EM-2 differs from that of EM-1 somewhat, because EM-2 additionally induces the release of dynorphin A and [Met]enkephalin in the spinal cord and brain by an unknown mechanism, which in turn activate the κ- and δ-opioid receptors, respectively, and a portion of the analgesic effects of EM-2 is dependent on this action. Moreover, while EM-1 produces conditioned place preference, a measure of drug reward, EM-2 produces conditioned place aversion, an effect which is dynorphin A-dependent. Similarly to the case of EM-1, the gene encoding for EM-2 has not yet been identified.

== See also ==
- β-Endorphin
