= Dactylysin =

Identifiers
- EC no.: 3.4.24.60
- CAS no.: 139466-40-3

Databases
- IntEnz: IntEnz view
- BRENDA: BRENDA entry
- ExPASy: NiceZyme view
- KEGG: KEGG entry
- MetaCyc: metabolic pathway
- PRIAM: profile
- PDB structures: RCSB PDB PDBe PDBsum
Search
- PMC: articles
- PubMed: articles
- NCBI: proteins

Dactylysin (EC 3.4.24.60, peptide hormone inactivating endopeptidase, PHIE) is an enzyme. This enzyme catalyses the following chemical reaction

Hydrolysis of peptides of at least six residues, with bulky hydrophobic residues in the P1' position. Shows a preference for hydrophobic doublets such as -Phe-Phe- and -Phe-Leu- in somatostatin-(1-14)-peptide and dynorphin A-(1-6)-peptide, respectively

This endopeptidase in the skin of the amphibian, Xenopus laevis.
