= Leumorphin =

Names
- IUPAC name L-Tyrosylglycylglycyl-L-phenylalanyl-L-leucyl-L-arginyl-L-arginyl-L-glutaminyl-L-phenylalanyl-L-lysyl-L-valyl-L-valyl-L-threonyl-L-arginyl-L-seryl-L-glutaminyl-L-α-glutamyl-L-α-aspartyl-L-prolyl-L-asparaginyl-L-alanyl-L-tyrosyl-L-serylglycyl-L-α-glutamyl-L-leucyl-L-phenylalanyl-L-α-aspartyl-L-alanine
- Other names Dynorphin B-29; Dynorphin B (1–29)

Identifiers
CAS Number	93443-35-7
3D model (JSmol)	Interactive image
ChemSpider	48063590
PubChem CID	16131065
CompTox Dashboard (EPA)	DTXSID00233356
- InChI: InChI=1S/C150H224N42O46/c1-74(2)59-97(181-137(227)99(62-81-27-15-12-16-28-81)171-113(202)70-165-112(201)69-166-123(213)88(152)61-84-38-42-86(196)43-39-84)135(225)174-91(35-24-56-163-149(158)159)125(215)172-90(34-23-55-162-148(156)157)126(216)175-95(47-51-110(154)199)130(220)182-101(63-82-29-17-13-18-30-82)138(228)173-89(33-21-22-54-151)132(222)189-119(76(5)6)143(233)190-120(77(7)8)144(234)191-121(80(11)195)145(235)178-92(36-25-57-164-150(160)161)127(217)188-107(73-194)141(231)177-94(46-50-109(153)198)129(219)176-96(49-53-116(206)207)131(221)186-105(68-118(210)211)146(236)192-58-26-37-108(192)142(232)185-103(66-111(155)200)133(223)168-78(9)122(212)179-100(65-85-40-44-87(197)45-41-85)140(230)187-106(72-193)124(214)167-71-114(203)170-93(48-52-115(204)205)128(218)180-98(60-75(3)4)136(226)183-102(64-83-31-19-14-20-32-83)139(229)184-104(67-117(208)209)134(224)169-79(10)147(237)238/h12-20,27-32,38-45,74-80,88-108,119-121,193-197H,21-26,33-37,46-73,151-152H2,1-11H3,(H2,153,198)(H2,154,199)(H2,155,200)(H,165,201)(H,166,213)(H,167,214)(H,168,223)(H,169,224)(H,170,203)(H,171,202)(H,172,215)(H,173,228)(H,174,225)(H,175,216)(H,176,219)(H,177,231)(H,178,235)(H,179,212)(H,180,218)(H,181,227)(H,182,220)(H,183,226)(H,184,229)(H,185,232)(H,186,221)(H,187,230)(H,188,217)(H,189,222)(H,190,233)(H,191,234)(H,204,205)(H,206,207)(H,208,209)(H,210,211)(H,237,238)(H4,156,157,162)(H4,158,159,163)(H4,160,161,164)/t78-,79-,80+,88-,89-,90-,91-,92-,93-,94-,95-,96-,97-,98-,99-,100-,101-,102-,103-,104-,105-,106-,107-,108-,119-,120-,121-/m0/s1 Key: NVEXXUGCBSXDLS-LNEXRSTESA-N; InChI=1/C150H224N42O46/c1-74(2)59-97(181-137(227)99(62-81-27-15-12-16-28-81)171-113(202)70-165-112(201)69-166-123(213)88(152)61-84-38-42-86(196)43-39-84)135(225)174-91(35-24-56-163-149(158)159)125(215)172-90(34-23-55-162-148(156)157)126(216)175-95(47-51-110(154)199)130(220)182-101(63-82-29-17-13-18-30-82)138(228)173-89(33-21-22-54-151)132(222)189-119(76(5)6)143(233)190-120(77(7)8)144(234)191-121(80(11)195)145(235)178-92(36-25-57-164-150(160)161)127(217)188-107(73-194)141(231)177-94(46-50-109(153)198)129(219)176-96(49-53-116(206)207)131(221)186-105(68-118(210)211)146(236)192-58-26-37-108(192)142(232)185-103(66-111(155)200)133(223)168-78(9)122(212)179-100(65-85-40-44-87(197)45-41-85)140(230)187-106(72-193)124(214)167-71-114(203)170-93(48-52-115(204)205)128(218)180-98(60-75(3)4)136(226)183-102(64-83-31-19-14-20-32-83)139(229)184-104(67-117(208)209)134(224)169-79(10)147(237)238/h12-20,27-32,38-45,74-80,88-108,119-121,193-197H,21-26,33-37,46-73,151-152H2,1-11H3,(H2,153,198)(H2,154,199)(H2,155,200)(H,165,201)(H,166,213)(H,167,214)(H,168,223)(H,169,224)(H,170,203)(H,171,202)(H,172,215)(H,173,228)(H,174,225)(H,175,216)(H,176,219)(H,177,231)(H,178,235)(H,179,212)(H,180,218)(H,181,227)(H,182,220)(H,183,226)(H,184,229)(H,185,232)(H,186,221)(H,187,230)(H,188,217)(H,189,222)(H,190,233)(H,191,234)(H,204,205)(H,206,207)(H,208,209)(H,210,211)(H,237,238)(H4,156,157,162)(H4,158,159,163)(H4,160,161,164)/t78-,79-,80+,88-,89-,90-,91-,92-,93-,94-,95-,96-,97-,98-,99-,100-,101-,102-,103-,104-,105-,106-,107-,108-,119-,120-,121-/m0/s1 Key: NVEXXUGCBSXDLS-LNEXRSTEBX
- SMILES: C[C@H]([C@@H](C(=O)N[C@@H](CCCNC(=N)N)C(=O)N[C@@H](CO)C(=O)N[C@@H](CCC(=O)N)C(=O)N[C@@H](CCC(=O)O)C(=O)N[C@@H](CC(=O)O)C(=O)N1CCC[C@H]1C(=O)N[C@@H](CC(=O)N)C(=O)N[C@@H](C)C(=O)N[C@@H](Cc2ccc(cc2)O)C(=O)N[C@@H](CO)C(=O)NCC(=O)N[C@@H](CCC(=O)O)C(=O)N[C@@H](CC(C)C)C(=O)N[C@@H](Cc3ccccc3)C(=O)N[C@@H](CC(=O)O)C(=O)N[C@@H](C)C(=O)O)NC(=O)[C@H](C(C)C)NC(=O)[C@H](C(C)C)NC(=O)[C@H](CCCCN)NC(=O)[C@H](Cc4ccccc4)NC(=O)[C@H](CCC(=O)N)NC(=O)[C@H](CCCNC(=N)N)NC(=O)[C@H](CCCNC(=N)N)NC(=O)[C@H](CC(C)C)NC(=O)[C@H](Cc5ccccc5)NC(=O)CNC(=O)CNC(=O)[C@H](Cc6ccc(cc6)O)N)O

Properties
Chemical formula	C_{161}H_{236}N_{42}O_{48}
Molar mass	3527.85 g/mol
- Except where otherwise noted, data are given for materials in their standard state (at 25 °C [77 °F], 100 kPa). Infobox references

Leumorphin, also known as dynorphin B_{1–29}, is a naturally occurring endogenous opioid peptide. Derived as a proteolytic cleavage product of residues 226-254 of prodynorphin (preproenkephalin B), leumorphin is a nonacosapeptide (29 amino acids in length) and has the sequence Tyr-Gly-Gly-Phe-Leu-Arg-Arg-Gln-Phe-Lys-Val-Val-Thr-Arg-Ser-Gln-Glu-Asp-Pro-Asn-Ala-Tyr-Ser-Gly-Glu-Leu-Phe-Asp-Ala. It can be further reduced to dynorphin B (dynorphin B-13) and dynorphin B-14 by pitrilysin metallopeptidase 1 (formerly referred to as "dynorphin-converting enzyme"), an enzyme of the endopeptidase family. Leumorphin behaves as a potent and selective κ-opioid receptor agonist, similarly to other endogenous opioid peptide derivatives of prodynorphin.

== See also ==
- Opioid peptide
