= Dipeptidyl-dipeptidase =

Identifiers
- EC no.: 3.4.14.6
- CAS no.: 91608-92-3

Databases
- IntEnz: IntEnz view
- BRENDA: BRENDA entry
- ExPASy: NiceZyme view
- KEGG: KEGG entry
- MetaCyc: metabolic pathway
- PRIAM: profile
- PDB structures: RCSB PDB PDBe PDBsum
Search
- PMC: articles
- PubMed: articles
- NCBI: proteins

Dipeptidyl-dipeptidase (EC 3.4.14.6, dipeptidyl tetrapeptide hydrolase, dipeptidyl ligase, tetrapeptide dipeptidase) is an enzyme. This enzyme catalyses the following chemical reaction

Preferential release of dipeptides from a tetrapeptide, e.g. Ala-Gly!Ala-Gly. Acts more slowly on Ala-Ala!Ala-Ala and Gly-Gly!Gly-Gly

This thiol-activated peptidase is isolated from cabbage (Brassica oleracea).
