= Dynorphin B =

Names
- Other names Dynorphin B-13; Rimorphin

Identifiers
CAS Number	85006-82-2
3D model (JSmol)	Interactive image
ChemSpider	17299995
PubChem CID	16133806
UNII	K41YC3AEI8
CompTox Dashboard (EPA)	DTXSID50648673
- InChI: InChI=1S/C74H115N21O17/c1-40(2)34-53(91-68(107)54(36-44-18-10-8-11-19-44)86-58(100)39-84-57(99)38-85-62(101)48(76)35-46-25-27-47(97)28-26-46)67(106)89-51(24-17-33-83-74(80)81)63(102)87-50(23-16-32-82-73(78)79)64(103)90-52(29-30-56(77)98)65(104)92-55(37-45-20-12-9-13-21-45)69(108)88-49(22-14-15-31-75)66(105)93-59(41(3)4)70(109)94-60(42(5)6)71(110)95-61(43(7)96)72(111)112/h8-13,18-21,25-28,40-43,48-55,59-61,96-97H,14-17,22-24,29-39,75-76H2,1-7H3,(H2,77,98)(H,84,99)(H,85,101)(H,86,100)(H,87,102)(H,88,108)(H,89,106)(H,90,103)(H,91,107)(H,92,104)(H,93,105)(H,94,109)(H,95,110)(H,111,112)(H4,78,79,82)(H4,80,81,83)/t43-,48+,49+,50+,51+,52+,53+,54+,55+,59+,60+,61+/m1/s1 Key: AGTSSZRZBSNTGQ-ITZCFHCWSA-N; InChI=1/C74H115N21O17/c1-40(2)34-53(91-68(107)54(36-44-18-10-8-11-19-44)86-58(100)39-84-57(99)38-85-62(101)48(76)35-46-25-27-47(97)28-26-46)67(106)89-51(24-17-33-83-74(80)81)63(102)87-50(23-16-32-82-73(78)79)64(103)90-52(29-30-56(77)98)65(104)92-55(37-45-20-12-9-13-21-45)69(108)88-49(22-14-15-31-75)66(105)93-59(41(3)4)70(109)94-60(42(5)6)71(110)95-61(43(7)96)72(111)112/h8-13,18-21,25-28,40-43,48-55,59-61,96-97H,14-17,22-24,29-39,75-76H2,1-7H3,(H2,77,98)(H,84,99)(H,85,101)(H,86,100)(H,87,102)(H,88,108)(H,89,106)(H,90,103)(H,91,107)(H,92,104)(H,93,105)(H,94,109)(H,95,110)(H,111,112)(H4,78,79,82)(H4,80,81,83)/t43-,48+,49+,50+,51+,52+,53+,54+,55+,59+,60+,61+/m1/s1 Key: AGTSSZRZBSNTGQ-ITZCFHCWBN
- SMILES: [H]/N=C(\N)/NCCC[C@@H](C(=O)N[C@@H](CCC(=O)N)C(=O)N[C@@H](Cc1ccccc1)C(=O)N[C@@H](CCCCN)C(=O)N[C@@H](C(C)C)C(=O)N[C@@H](C(C)C)C(=O)N[C@@H]([C@@H](C)O)C(=O)O)NC(=O)[C@H](CCCN/C(=N/[H])/N)NC(=O)[C@H](CC(C)C)NC(=O)[C@H](Cc2ccccc2)NC(=O)CNC(=O)CNC(=O)[C@H](Cc3ccc(cc3)O)N

Properties
Chemical formula	C_{74}H_{115}N_{21}O_{17}
Molar mass	1570.8354
- Except where otherwise noted, data are given for materials in their standard state (at 25 °C [77 °F], 100 kPa). verify (what is ?) Infobox references

Dynorphin B, also known as rimorphin, is a form of dynorphin and an endogenous opioid peptide with the amino acid sequence Tyr-Gly-Gly-Phe-Leu-Arg-Arg-Gln-Phe-Lys-Val-Val-Thr (YGGFLRRQFKVVT). Dynorphin B is generated as a proteolytic cleavage product of leumorphin, which in turn is a cleavage product of preproenkephalin B (prodynorphin).

Dynorphin B has an identical N-terminal sequence, but different C-terminal sequence to dynorphin A. In an alanine scan of the non-glycine residues of dynorphin B, it was discovered that Tyr^{1} and Phe^{4} residues are critical for both opioid receptor affinity and κ-opioid receptor agonist potency, Arg^{6} and Arg^{7} promote κ-opioid affinity and Lys^{10} contributes to the opioid receptor affinity.

== Inducers of dynorphin B ==
Cannabinoid CP55,940 and △^{9}-tetrahydrocannabinol (△^{9}-THC) can induce the release of dynorphin B, which in return acts as an agonist of κ-opioid receptors, resulting in the production of antinociception. Similarly, Tyr-D-Arg-Phe-Sar (TAPS) is capable of promoting a release of dynorphin B through the simulation of μ_{1}-opioid receptors, causing a production of antinociception. The antinociceptive effect produced by dynorphin B allows for spinal analgesia.

== See also ==
- Dynorphin
- Dynorphin A
- Big dynorphin
- κ-opioid receptor
- Prodynorphin
