= Cryptide (disambiguation) =

Cryptide is a bioactive peptide.

Cryptide can also refer to:

- Cryptid, rumored or suspected creatures for which conclusive evidence is still missing
  - List of cryptids
  - Cryptid Hunters, a 2004 novel by Roland Smith
- Cryptand, a family of synthetic bi- and polycyclic multidentate ligands for a variety of cations
