= Tetrapeptide =

Peptide that consists of four amino acids

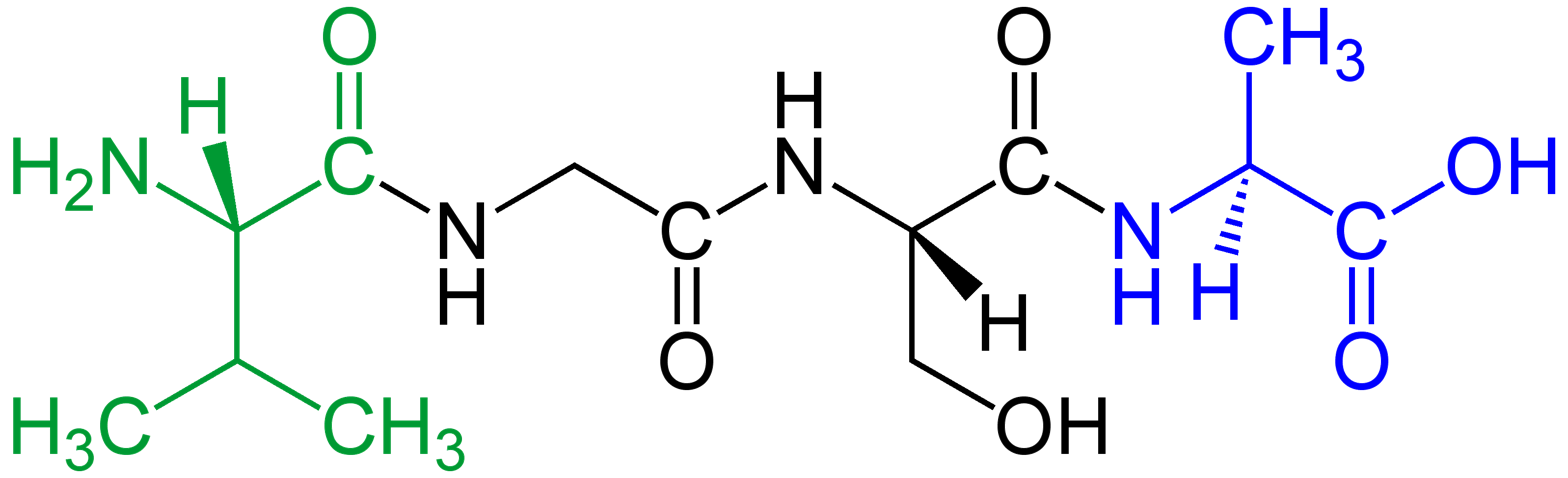
A tetrapeptide (example Val-Gly-Ser-Ala) with green marked amino end (L-Valine) and blue marked carboxyl end (L-Alanine).

A tetrapeptide is a peptide, classified as an oligopeptide, since it only consists of four amino acids joined by peptide bonds. Many tetrapeptides are pharmacologically active, often showing affinity and specificity for a variety of receptors in protein-protein signaling. Present in nature are both linear and cyclic tetrapeptides (CTPs), the latter of which mimics protein reverse turns which are often present on the surface of proteins and druggable targets. Tetrapeptides may be cyclized by a fourth peptide bond or other covalent bonds.

Examples of tetrapeptides are:

- Tuftsin (L-threonyl-L-lysyl-L-prolyl-L-arginine) is a peptide related primarily to the immune system function.
- Rigin (glycyl-L-glutaminyl-L-prolyl-L-arginine) is a tetrapeptide with functions similar to those of tuftsin.
- Postin (Lys-Pro-Pro-Arg) is the N-terminal tetrapeptide of cystatin C and an antagonist of tuftsin.
- Endomorphin-1 (H-Tyr-Pro-Trp-Phe-NH_{2}) and endomorphin-2 (H-Tyr-Pro-Phe-Phe-NH_{2}) are peptide amides with the highest known affinity and specificity for the μ opioid receptor.
- Morphiceptin (H-Tyr-Pro-Phe-Pro-NH_{2}) is a casomorphin peptide isolated from β-casein.
- Gluten exorphines A4 (H-Gly-Tyr-Tyr-Pro-OH) and B4 (H-Tyr-Gly-Gly-Trp-OH) are peptides isolated from gluten.
- Tyrosine-MIF-1 (H-Tyr-Pro-Leu-Gly-NH_{2}) is an endogenous opioid modulator.
- Tetragastrin (N-((phenylmethoxy)carbonyl)-L-tryptophyl-L-methionyl-L-aspartyl-L-phenylalaninamide) is the C-terminal tetrapeptide of gastrin. It is the smallest peptide fragment of gastrin which has the same physiological and pharmacological activity as gastrin.
- Kentsin (H-Thr-Pro-Arg-Lys-OH) is a contraceptive peptide first isolated from female hamsters.
- Achatin-I (glycyl-phenylalanyl-alanyl-aspartic acid) is a neuroexcitatory tetrapeptide from giant African snail (Achatina fulica).
- Tentoxin (cyclo(N-methyl-L-alanyl-L-leucyl-N-methyl-trans-dehydrophenyl-alanyl-glycyl)) is a natural cyclic tetrapeptide produced by phytopathogenic fungi from genus Alternaria.
- Rapastinel (H-Thr-Pro-Pro-Thr-NH_{2}) is a partial agonist of the NMDA receptor.
- HC-toxin, cyclo(D-Pro-L-Ala-D-Ala-L-Aeo), where Aeo is 2-amino-8-oxo-9,10-epoxy decanoic acid, is a virulence factor for the fungus Cochliobolus carbonum on its host, maize.
- Elamipretide, (D-Arg-dimethylTyr-Lys-Phe-NH_{2}) a drug candidate that targets mitochondria.

== Cyclic Tetrapeptides ==
Cyclic tetrapeptides are a class of drugs that contain an α-epoxyketone group that has the potential to alkylate the HDAC active site. The HDAC active site, also known as histone deacetylase, are isozymes that modulate numerous regulatory signals and pathways within biological systems. They serve as targets for drug design. If the cyclic tetrapeptides were to alkylate the HDAC active site, they would deactivate the HDAC catalytic pocket. The tetra-peptide tuftsin (Thr–Lys–Pro–Arg), has been reported to affect a wide variety of biological responses in neutrophils and mononuclear phagocytes and also phagocytosis. It has also been reported that a tetra-peptide with the amino acid sequence, RGDS, that is from the cell-binding domain of the fibronectin molecule, is capable of blocking fibronectin from attaching to the cells. Based on that report, they were able to suggest that the RGDS tetra-peptide is capable of blocking RPE attachment to a variety of extracellular matrix component including; fibronectin, type I collagen, type II collagen, laminin, and lens capsule basement membrane. By utilizing time-lapse cinematography, it has been shown that the RGDS tetra-peptide inhibits the ability of cells to contract collagen.

== Some examples of how tetrapeptides are utilized in scientific research ==
=== Tentoxin ===
Tentoxin is most commonly known as a naturally occurring phytotoxic cyclic tetra-peptide that is excreted by fungi of the Alternaria alternata family. There were four total syntheses of tentoxin that were published to this day that gave very poor total yields. These poor yields were mainly due to the introduction of the dehydro amino acid, more specifically the cyclization step. There was a method developed in order to stereospecifically introduce Z-dehydrophenylalanine by a modified Erlenmeyer adolization reaction. An aldol reaction is a transformation that is due to the dimerization of an aldehyde (or ketone) to a beta-hydroxy aldehyde (or ketone) by alpha C-H addition of one reactant molecule to the carbonyl group of a second reactant molecule. This reaction requires at least one of the reactants to have hydrogens. The precursor of tentoxin, the linear tetrapeptide (Boc-R1Ala-Leu-R2ΔZPhe-Gly-OMe), was obtained from Boc-Leu-Gly-OH with a 72% yield. This linear tetrapeptide with carbon-14 was utilized to study the four cyclization reagents, DPPA, DCC-PfpOH, HBTU, and HATU. By doing so, this gave the tentoxin an 81% cyclization yield.

=== Tetra-peptide Inhibitor ===
In order to understand more about the mechanisms that are utilized to regulate the activation of caspases, a study was conducted to identify the conditions that would potentially lead to as complete and synchronous an induction of apoptosis as possible using a tetrapeptide inhibitor. This was achieved by utilizing HL-60 cells, which are a human promyelocytic cell line, in order to show that both anisomycin and geranylgeraniol are able to induce apoptosis in approximately 80% of the cells within two hours. Anisomycin is a translational inhibitor that is secreted by Streptomyces spp., it strongly activates the stress-activated mitogen-activate protein kinases, JNK/SAPK and p38/RK in mammalian cells. This results in the rapid induction of immediate-early genes within the nuclease. Geranylgeraniol is a diterpene alcohol that is used for perfume ingredients and as a raw material for synthesizing vitamins such as; vitamin A and E. It is also reported to prevent inhibition of the osteoclast formation as well as bone resorption in vitro. It has also show to induce anticancer, antitumor, and antileishmanial potentials.

The induction of apoptosis in the HL-60 cells is accompanied by the processing of activation of caspase-3 and potentially caspase-2. Benzyloxycarbonyl-Val-Ala-Asp-(OMe)-fluoromethylketone (zVAD.fmk), a tetrapeptide inhibitor of caspases, was added to prolong the induction of apoptosis that was induced by either agent. It also enabled some cells to continue to grow up to 72 hours after the treatment. This method was essential to the study to better understand the mechanisms of apoptosis.

=== Novel Vaccine Adjuvant ===
A novel vaccine adjuvant that's purpose is to evoke both humoral and cellular immune responses was reported. This vaccine adjuvant was found from a supramolecular hydrogel of a self-assembling D-tetra-peptide. Prior pioneering work has found that self-assembling peptides can serve as self-adjuvated vaccines through the covalent conjugation of peptide or protein antigens, but that cannot elicit strong CD8^+ T-cell responses. However, in a recent study it has been found that the self-assembling L-peptide derivative (Nap-GFFY-NMe, naphthylacetic acid modified tetra-peptide of GFFY with C-terminal methyl amide group) that was formed fromm the phosphatase, could co-assemble with HIV DNA molecules and raise both humoral and cellular immune responses against HIV. It has been reported that the large-scale synthesis of the phosphorylated precursor (Nap-GFFpY-NMe or Nap-GFFpY-OMe (naphthylacetic acid modified phosphorylated tetra-peptide of GFFpY with C-terminal methyl ester group)) is extremely difficult. It has also been reported that the need of enzyme triggering could possibly cause side effects including; reproducibility problems and composition variation. If they are able to develop a peptide hydrogel as a vaccine adjuvant that contains a well-defined molecular structure and a very simple formulation mode, it would be very promising.

=== Trapoxin ===
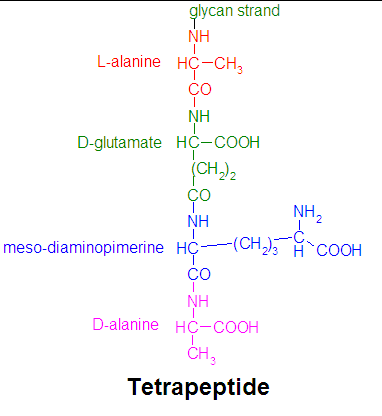
Common structure of a tetrapeptide.

Trapoxin A, (cyclo-(L-phenylalanyl-L-phenylalanyl-D-pipecolinyl-L-2-amino-8-oxo-9,10-epoxy-decanoyl)), is commonly known as an anti-tumor cyclic tetra-peptide. In a prior study, it has been found that the fungal product, Trapoxin, can induce morphological reversion from transformed to normal in sis-transformed NIH3T3 fibroblasts. It was also found that trapoxin can cause highly acetylated core histones in many different mammalian cell lines to accumulate. Vitro experiments were conducted, and it was found that a low concentration of trapoxin could irreversibly inhibit deacetylation of acetylated histone molecules. The study reported that this could be due to the chemical reduction of an epoxide group, that is in trapoxin, completely abolishing the inhibitory activity. This suggested that trapoxin binds covalently to the histone deacetylase via the epoxide. On the contrary, the inhibition by trichostatin A, which is a known potent inhibitor of histone deacetylase, could be reversible. Despite their mode of inhibitions being different, trapoxin and trichostatin A had nearly the same biological effects on the cell cycle. The in vivo effects that are commonly induced by these agents could be attributed to histone hyperacetylation that results from the inhibition of histone deacetylase, which was strongly suggested from the results.

== See also ==
- Dipeptide
- Tripeptide
- Decapeptide
- cyclic peptide
