= Binaltorphimine =

Chemical compound

Clinical data
- ATC code: None

Identifiers
- IUPAC name: (1S,2S,7S,8R,12S,20R,24R,32R)-11,33-bis(cyclopropylmethyl)-22-methyl-19,25-dioxa-11,22,33-triazaundecacyclo[24.9.1.1^{8,14}.0^{1,24}.0^{2,32}.0^{4,23}.0^{5,21}.0^{7,12}.0^{8,20}.0^{18,37}.0^{30,36}]heptatriaconta-4(23),5(21),14(37),15,17,26(36),27,29-octaene-2,7,17,27-tetrol
- CAS Number: 105618-27-7
- PubChem CID: 5484197
- ChemSpider: 24673307
- UNII: 94L0JAS27S
- ChEMBL: ChEMBL610001
- CompTox Dashboard (EPA): DTXSID90909634

Chemical and physical data
- Formula: C_{41}H_{45}N_{3}O_{6}
- Molar mass: 675.826 g·mol^{−1}
- 3D model (JSmol): Interactive image
- SMILES: CN1C2=C(C[C@]3([C@H]4CC5=C6[C@]3([C@H]2OC6=C(C=C5)O)CCN4CC7CC7)O)C8=C1[C@H]9[C@@]12CCN([C@@H]([C@@]1(C8)O)CC1=C2C(=C(C=C1)O)O9)CC1CC1
- InChI: InChI=1S/C41H45N3O6/c1-42-32-24(16-40(47)28-14-22-6-8-26(45)34-30(22)38(40,36(32)49-34)10-12-43(28)18-20-2-3-20)25-17-41(48)29-15-23-7-9-27(46)35-31(23)39(41,37(50-35)33(25)42)11-13-44(29)19-21-4-5-21/h6-9,20-21,28-29,36-37,45-48H,2-5,10-19H2,1H3/t28-,29-,36+,37+,38+,39+,40-,41-/m1/s1; Key:DKIVQMBUHVYDFC-IWRYZOJTSA-N

Binaltorphimine (BNI) is a selective antagonist of the κ-opioid receptor (KOR). BNI and norbinaltorphimine (nor-BNI) were the first highly selective KOR antagonists to be discovered.

== See also ==
- 5'-GNTI
- JDTic
