= Proenkephalin =

Protein-coding gene in the species Homo sapiens

PENK
Available structures
PDB	Ortholog search: PDBe RCSB
PDB	List of PDB id codes 1PLW, 1PLX, 2LWC, 5E33, 5E3A

Identifiers
- Aliases: PENK, proenkephalin, PE, PENK-A
- External IDs: OMIM: 131330; MGI: 104629; HomoloGene: 4528; GeneCards: PENK; OMA:PENK - orthologs

Gene location (Human)
Chr.	Chromosome 8 (human)
Band	8q12.1	Start	56,436,674 bp
Band	8q12.1	End	56,446,671 bp

Gene location (Mouse)
Chr.	Chromosome 4 (mouse)
Band	4 A1|4 2.31 cM	Start	4,133,531 bp
Band	4 A1|4 2.31 cM	End	4,138,819 bp
RNA expression pattern
Bgee	Human / Mouse (ortholog); Top expressed in: nucleus accumbens; putamen; right testis; left testis; cartilage tissue; caudate nucleus; ganglionic eminence; middle frontal gyrus; external globus pallidus; urethra / Top expressed in: ciliary body; olfactory tubercle; nucleus accumbens; globus pallidus; superior frontal gyrus; efferent ductule; entorhinal cortex; calvaria; skin of external ear; iris; More reference expression data
BioGPS	n/a
Gene ontology
Molecular function	opioid peptide activity; protein binding; neuropeptide hormone activity; opioid receptor binding
Cellular component	perikaryon; cell body fiber; axon; symmetric synapse; dendrite; plasma membrane; axon terminus; soma; extracellular region; endoplasmic reticulum lumen; synaptic vesicle lumen; neuronal dense core vesicle lumen
Biological process	cellular response to transforming growth factor beta stimulus; cellular response to virus; general adaptation syndrome, behavioral process; response to estradiol; response to hypoxia; startle response; locomotory behavior; response to nicotine; ageing; response to epinephrine; cellular response to vitamin D; behavioral fear response; locomotory exploration behavior; response to calcium ion; response to morphine; response to lipopolysaccharide; osteoblast differentiation; glial cell proliferation; sensory perception of pain; cellular response to oxidative stress; response to radiation; response to ethanol; positive regulation of behavioral fear response; response to toxic substance; cellular response to cAMP; aggressive behavior; signal transduction; sensory perception; neuropeptide signaling pathway; chemical synaptic transmission; post-translational protein modification; regulation of signaling receptor activity; G protein-coupled receptor signaling pathway; response to bacterium
Sources:Amigo / QuickGO
Orthologs
Species	Human	Mouse
Entrez	5179	18619
Ensembl	ENSG00000181195	ENSMUSG00000045573
UniProt	P01210	P22005
RefSeq (mRNA)	NM_006211; NM_001135690	NM_001002927; NM_001348209
RefSeq (protein)	NP_001129162	NP_001002927; NP_001335138
Location (UCSC)	Chr 8: 56.44 – 56.45 Mb	Chr 4: 4.13 – 4.14 Mb
PubMed search
- Wikidata
View/Edit Human	View/Edit Mouse

Proenkephalin (PENK), formerly known as proenkephalin A (since proenkephalin B was renamed prodynorphin), is an endogenous opioid polypeptide hormone which, via proteolyic cleavage, produces the enkephalin peptides met-enkephalin, and to a lesser extent, leu-enkephalin. Upon cleavage, each proenkephalin peptide results in the generation of four copies of Met-enkephalin, two extended copies of met-enkephalin, and one copy of leu-enkephalin. Contrarily, Leu-enkephalin is predominantly synthesized from prodynorphin, which produces three copies of it per cleavage, and no copies of Met-enkephalin. Other endogenous opioid peptides produced by proenkephalin include adrenorphin, amidorphin, BAM-18, BAM-20P, BAM-22P, peptide B, peptide E, and peptide F.

The following table lists the peptides that are derived from cleavage of the proenkephalin protein.

Peptide	Alternative Names	Amino acid positions
Met-enkephalin	Opioid growth factor (OGF)	107–111
PENK(114–133)	Neuropeptide E; ENK-20	114–133
Leu-enkephalin	—	150–154
Met-enkephalin-Arg-Phe	MERF; Neuropeptide AF	186–191
Met-enkephalin-Arg-Gly-Leu	MERGL; Neuropeptide AM	218–223
PENK(237–258)	Neuropeptide F	237–258

== Clinical significance ==
Proenkephalin is produced by the medium spiny neurons of the striatum which undergo neurodegeneration in early stages of Huntington's disease (HD). PENK and related peptides measured in cerebrospinal fluid are proposed as potential biomarkers of disease progression in HD. Furthermore, PENK has been found associated with acute kidney injury and glomerular filtration rate in steady-state and critically ill patients.

== See also ==
- Prodynorphin (Proenkephalin B)
- Proopiomelanocortin (POMC)
