= Nociceptin =

Neuropeptide chemical compound

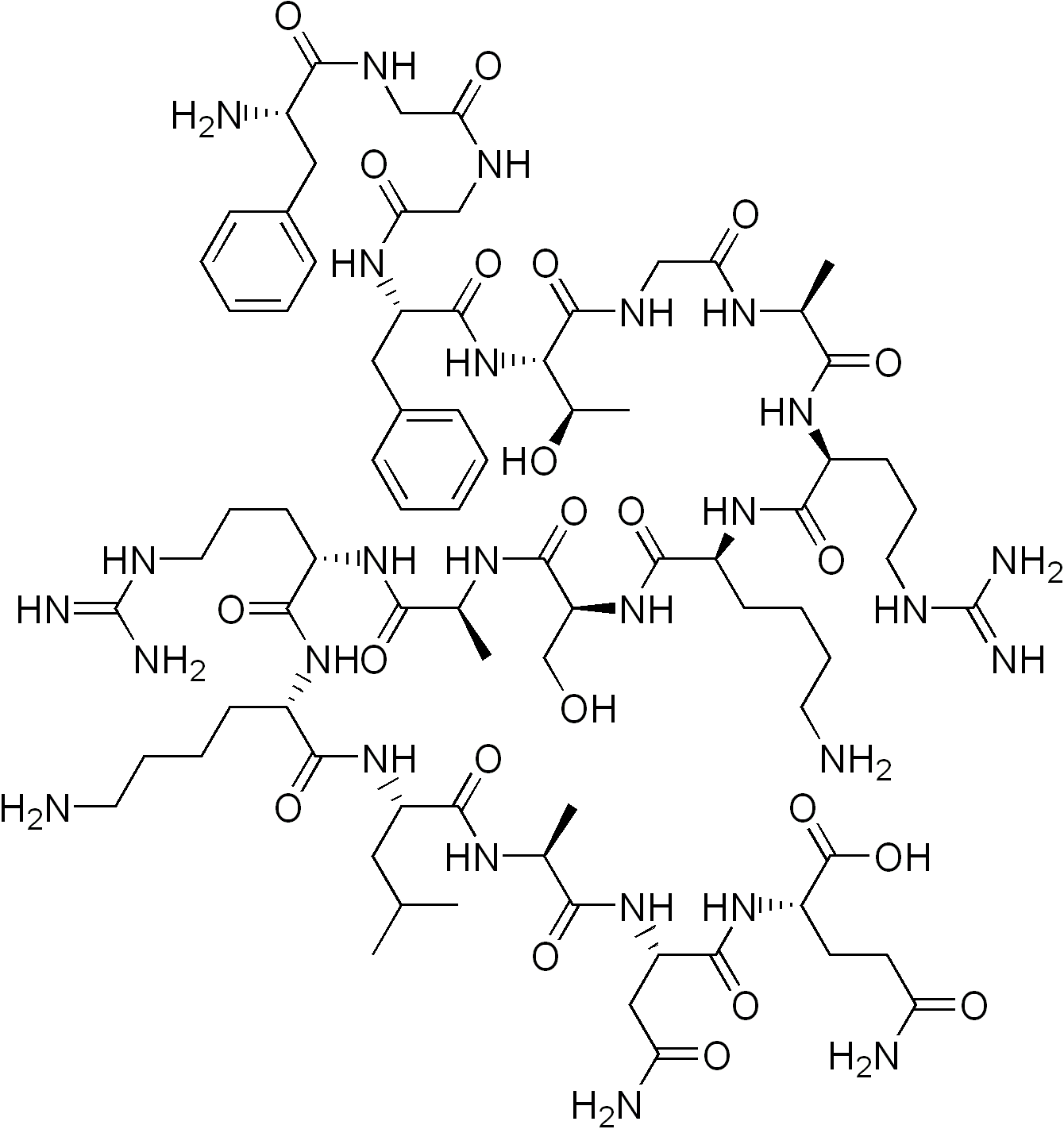

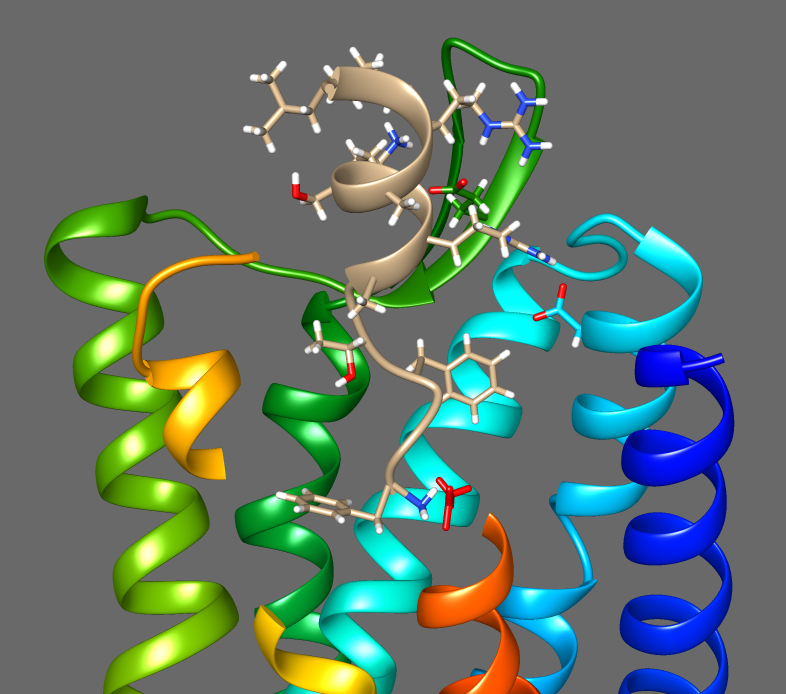

Names
- Other names Orphanin FQ

Identifiers
CAS Number	170713-75-4
3D model (JSmol)	Interactive image
ChEBI	CHEBI:80266
ChEMBL	ChEMBL396460
ChemSpider	17288154
IUPHAR/BPS	1681
MeSH	nociceptin
PubChem CID	16131448
UNII	7AYI9N34FF
CompTox Dashboard (EPA)	DTXSID60168933
- InChI: InChI=1S/C79H129N27O22/c1-41(2)33-54(72(122)95-44(5)66(116)103-56(36-59(84)110)73(123)102-53(77(127)128)27-28-58(83)109)104-70(120)49(23-13-15-29-80)100-69(119)52(26-18-32-90-79(87)88)99-65(115)43(4)96-75(125)57(40-107)105-71(121)50(24-14-16-30-81)101-68(118)51(25-17-31-89-78(85)86)98-64(114)42(3)94-61(112)39-93-76(126)63(45(6)108)106-74(124)55(35-47-21-11-8-12-22-47)97-62(113)38-91-60(111)37-92-67(117)48(82)34-46-19-9-7-10-20-46/h7-12,19-22,41-45,48-57,63,107-108H,13-18,23-40,80-82H2,1-6H3,(H2,83,109)(H2,84,110)(H,91,111)(H,92,117)(H,93,126)(H,94,112)(H,95,122)(H,96,125)(H,97,113)(H,98,114)(H,99,115)(H,100,119)(H,101,118)(H,102,123)(H,103,116)(H,104,120)(H,105,121)(H,106,124)(H,127,128)(H4,85,86,89)(H4,87,88,90)/t42-,43-,44-,45+,48-,49-,50-,51-,52-,53-,54-,55-,56-,57-,63-/m0/s1 Key: PULGYDLMFSFVBL-SMFNREODSA-N
- SMILES: C[C@H]([C@@H](C(=O)NCC(=O)N[C@@H](C)C(=O)N[C@@H](CCCNC(=N)N)C(=O)N[C@@H](CCCCN)C(=O)N[C@@H](CO)C(=O)N[C@@H](C)C(=O)N[C@@H](CCCNC(=N)N)C(=O)N[C@@H](CCCCN)C(=O)N[C@@H](CC(C)C)C(=O)N[C@@H](C)C(=O)N[C@@H](CC(=O)N)C(=O)N[C@@H](CCC(=O)N)C(=O)O)NC(=O)[C@H](Cc1ccccc1)NC(=O)CNC(=O)CNC(=O)[C@H](Cc2ccccc2)N)O

Properties
Chemical formula	C_{79}H_{129}N_{27}O_{22}
Molar mass	1809.04
- Except where otherwise noted, data are given for materials in their standard state (at 25 °C [77 °F], 100 kPa). verify (what is ?) Infobox references

prepronociceptin

Identifiers
- Symbol: PNOC
- NCBI gene: 5368
- HGNC: 9163
- OMIM: 601459
- RefSeq: NM_006228
- UniProt: Q13519

Other data
- Locus: Chr. 8 p21
Search for
- Structures: Swiss-model
- Domains: InterPro

Nociceptin/orphanin FQ (N/OFQ), a 17-amino acid neuropeptide, is the endogenous ligand for the nociceptin receptor (NOP, ORL-1). Nociceptin acts as a potent anti-analgesic, effectively counteracting the effect of pain-relievers; its activation is associated with brain functions such as pain sensation and fear learning.

The gene coding for prepronociceptin is located on Ch8p21 in humans. Nociceptin is derived from the prepronociceptin protein, as are a further two peptides, nocistatin and NocII, both of which inhibit N/OFQ receptor function. Nociceptin is the first example of reverse pharmacology; the NOP receptor was discovered before the endogenous ligand which was discovered by two separate groups in 1995.

== Roles of nociceptin ==
Since its discovery, nociceptin has been of great interest to researchers. Nociceptin is a peptide related to the kappa opioid receptor ligand dynorphin A, but it does not act at the classic opioid receptors (namely, mu, kappa, and delta opioid receptors) which typically act as pain relievers. Nociceptin is widely distributed in the CNS; it is found in the hypothalamus, brainstem, and forebrain, as well as in the ventral and dorsal horns of the spinal cord. The NOP receptor is also widely distributed throughout areas of the brain, including the cortex, anterior olfactory nucleus, lateral septum, hypothalamus, hippocampus, amygdala, central gray, pontine nuclei, interpeduncular nucleus, substantia nigra, raphe complex, locus coeruleus, and spinal cord.

=== Pain ===
The N/OFQ-NOP system is found in central and peripheral nervous tissue, where it is well placed to modulate nociception, or the body's sensation of pain. Unlike morphine and other opioids that are used to alleviate pain, nociceptin's role in nociception is not straightforward. Administration of N/OFQ in the brain causes increased sensations of pain (hyperalgesia). This makes it unique from classic opioid peptides, which typically act as analgesics (pain relievers), as it means that nociceptin can even counteract analgesia, thus acting as an antiopioid. Additionally, blocking the nociceptin receptor can lead to an increased pain threshold and a decreased tolerance development to analgesic opioids. As such, nociceptin has a lower risk of addiction than many pain relievers that are currently used. Recent studies have proposed that this anti-analgesic function of nociceptin stems from the inhibition of the periaqueductal grey, which controls pain modulation from the central nervous system. This effect of nociceptin may lead to its future use as a method to reduce morphine dosage and decrease the development of tolerance and dependence. When administered to the spinal cord, nociceptin produces similar analgesic effects to classical opioids.

=== Mood disorders ===
There are various studies on animals that suggest that the N/OFQ-NOP system has a part to play in both anxiety and depression. It appears that nociceptin is an anxiolytic (anxiety inhibitor) but also seems to perpetuate depression, since preventing N/OFQ from binding to NOP seems to improve depression.

=== Drug abuse medications ===
The NOP receptor has shown potential as a target for medications designed to alleviate the effects of substance abuse disorders. Areas in the hypothalamus and amygdala that correlate to the reward process of drug abuse have been found to contain NOP receptors. Nociceptin has also been found to inhibit dopamine production related to the reward process. Specifically, nociceptin acts to inhibit neural rewards induced by drugs such as amphetamines, morphine, cocaine, and especially alcohol in animal models, though the exact mechanism of this has not yet been proven. Additionally, nociceptin may have lower tolerance development than drugs such as morphine. This was shown when nociceptin compounds were used as a pain medication substitution for morphine. Nociceptin also has therapeutic capabilities for addictions to multiple drugs, potentially playing a role in compounds that have decreased withdrawal tendencies (such as muscle aches, anxiety, and restlessness).

=== Learning and memory ===
In animal studies, the N/OFQ-NOP receptor pathway has also been found to play both positive and negative roles in both learning and memory. For example, malfunctions in this pathway are linked to altered fear learning in brain disorders such as post-traumatic stress disorder (PTSD). As such, the receptor pathway maintains homeostatic responses to fear and stressful situations. Nociceptin could also play an inhibitory role in memory function, as some studies show that it impairs spatial learning in vivo, while inhibiting long term potentiation and synaptic transmission in vitro.

=== Cardiovascular system ===
The N/OFQ-NOP system has also been implicated in control of the cardiovascular system, as nociceptin administration has led to high blood pressure and bradycardia. Nociceptin has significant effects on cardiovascular parameters such as blood pressure and heart rate that vary by species, as it is excitatory for rodents yet inhibitory for sheep.

=== Renal system ===
In the renal system, nociceptin plays a role in water balance, electrolyte balance, and arterial blood pressure regulation. It has also shown potential as a diuretic treatment for alleviating water-retaining diseases.

=== Immune system ===
Additional research suggests that nociceptin may be involved in the immune system and sepsis. A study at the University of Leicester looked at patients who were critically ill with sepsis and found that blood N/OFQ levels were significantly higher in patients who died within thirty days in comparison to survivors.

=== Digestive system ===
In the gut, nociceptin has been found to have varying effects on stomach and intestinal contractility while also stimulating the increased consumption of food. Additional studies have shown that nociceptin may have an effect as an anti-epileptic drug component.

== See also ==
- Nociceptor
