= Hemorphin =

Class of opioid peptides

Hemorphins are a class of naturally occurring, endogenous opioid peptides which are found in the bloodstream, and are derived from the β-chain of hemoglobin. They have antinociceptive effects via activation of the opioid receptors, and some may also play a role in blood pressure through inhibition of the angiotensin-converting enzyme (ACE), as well as cause an elevation of endogenous enkephalin levels. Some examples of hemorphins include hemorphin-4, spinorphin, and valorphin.

== See also ==
- Casomorphin
