= Valorphin =

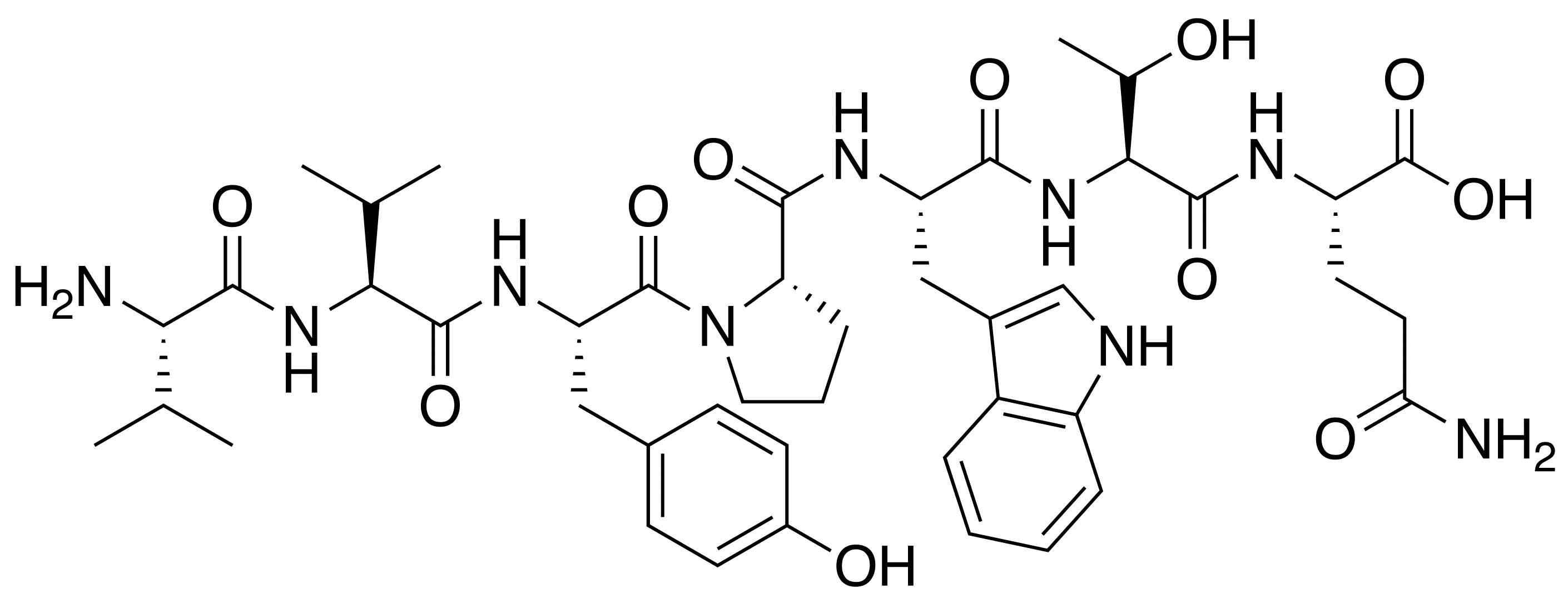

Names
- IUPAC name L-Valyl-L-valyl-L-tyrosyl-L-prolyl-L-tryptophyl-L-threonyl-L-glutamine

Identifiers
CAS Number	144313-54-2
3D model (JSmol)	Interactive image
ChemSpider	27470960
PubChem CID	90470048
- InChI: InChI=1S/C44H60N8O12/c1-22(2)35(45)40(59)50-36(23(3)4)41(60)49-32(19-25-12-14-27(54)15-13-25)43(62)52-18-8-11-33(52)39(58)48-31(20-26-21-46-29-10-7-6-9-28(26)29)38(57)51-37(24(5)53)42(61)47-30(44(63)64)16-17-34(55)56/h6-7,9-10,12-15,21-24,30-33,35-37,46,53-54H,8,11,16-20,45H2,1-5H3,(H,47,61)(H,48,58)(H,49,60)(H,50,59)(H,51,57)(H,55,56)(H,63,64)/t24-,30+,31+,32+,33+,35+,36+,37+/m1/s1 Key: CNYWVXYFCKFXLL-NMUVPRMFSA-N
- SMILES: C[C@H]([C@@H](C(=O)N[C@@H](CCC(=O)N)C(=O)O)NC(=O)[C@H](Cc1c[nH]c2c1cccc2)NC(=O)[C@@H]3CCCN3C(=O)[C@H](Cc4ccc(cc4)O)NC(=O)[C@H](C(C)C)NC(=O)[C@H](C(C)C)N)O

Properties
Chemical formula	C_{44}H_{61}N_{9}O_{11}
Molar mass	892.024 g·mol^{−1}
- Except where otherwise noted, data are given for materials in their standard state (at 25 °C [77 °F], 100 kPa). Infobox references

Valorphin, also known as VV-hemorphin-5, is a naturally occurring, endogenous opioid heptapeptide of the hemorphin family with the amino acid sequence H-Val-Val-Tyr-Pro-Trp-Thr-Gln-OH (VVYPWTQ). It is produced in the body via proteolyic cleavage of residues 33-39 of the β-chain of hemoglobin. Valorphin binds preferentially to the μ-opioid receptor and produces effects such as analgesia and self-administration in animals. It also possesses cytotoxic and antiproliferative properties against tumor cells, the mediation of which, because they are reversed by naloxone, appears to be dependent on the opioid receptors.

== See also ==
- Hemorphin
