= Dynorphin A =

Names
- Other names Dynorphin 1-13

Identifiers
CAS Number	72957-38-1
3D model (JSmol)	Interactive image
ChEMBL	ChEMBL411557
ChemSpider	17287683
DrugBank	DB16146
IUPHAR/BPS	1620
PubChem CID	16130969
UNII	VFC23V742Z
- InChI: InChI=1S/C75H126N24O15/c1-7-45(6)61(70(111)94-53(25-17-35-87-75(83)84)71(112)99-36-18-26-58(99)69(110)93-50(21-11-13-31-76)64(105)96-56(38-44(4)5)67(108)95-54(72(113)114)22-12-14-32-77)98-65(106)52(24-16-34-86-74(81)82)91-63(104)51(23-15-33-85-73(79)80)92-66(107)55(37-43(2)3)97-68(109)57(40-46-19-9-8-10-20-46)90-60(102)42-88-59(101)41-89-62(103)49(78)39-47-27-29-48(100)30-28-47/h8-10,19-20,27-30,43-45,49-58,61,100H,7,11-18,21-26,31-42,76-78H2,1-6H3,(H,88,101)(H,89,103)(H,90,102)(H,91,104)(H,92,107)(H,93,110)(H,94,111)(H,95,108)(H,96,105)(H,97,109)(H,98,106)(H,113,114)(H4,79,80,85)(H4,81,82,86)(H4,83,84,87)/t45-,49-,50-,51-,52-,53-,54?,55-,56-,57-,58-,61-/m0/s1 Key: OVVIBUHLQIYUEU-LCBAMVSPSA-N
- SMILES: Isomeric SMILES CC[C@H](C)[C@@H](C(=O)N[C@@H](CCCNC(=N)N)C(=O)N1CCC[C@H]1C(=O)N[C@@H](CCCCN)C(=O)N[C@@H](CC(C)C)C(=O)NC(CCCCN)C(=O)O)NC(=O)[C@H](CCCNC(=N)N)NC(=O)[C@H](CCCNC(=N)N)NC(=O)[C@H](CC(C)C)NC(=O)[C@H](CC2=CC=CC=C2)NC(=O)CNC(=O)CNC(=O)[C@H](CC3=CC=C(C=C3)O)N

Properties
Chemical formula	C_{75}H_{126}N_{24}O_{15}
Molar mass	1603.95474
- Except where otherwise noted, data are given for materials in their standard state (at 25 °C [77 °F], 100 kPa). verify (what is ?) Infobox references

Dynorphin A is a dynorphin, an endogenous opioid peptide that activates the κ-opioid receptor. Its amino acid sequence is Tyr-Gly-Gly-Phe-Leu-Arg-Arg-Ile-Arg-Pro-Lys-Leu-Lys (YGGFLRRIRPKLK), a tridecapeptide.

Chemical structure of Dynorphin A_{1–8} fragment

Dynorphin A_{1–8} is a truncated form of dynorphin A with the amino acid sequence: Tyr-Gly-Gly-Phe-Leu-Arg-Arg-Ile (YGGFLRRI). Dynorphin A_{1–8} is an agonist at the mu-, kappa-, and delta-opioid receptors; it has the highest binding affinity for the κ-opioid receptor (KOR). Structures of dynorphin A bound to the κ-opioid receptor have been reported.

== See also ==
- Dynorphin
- Dynorphin B
- Big dynorphin
- κ-Opioid receptor agonist
- κ-opioid receptor
- Prodynorphin
