= Rubiscolin =

Class of opioid peptides

The rubiscolins are a group of opioid peptides that are formed during digestion of the ribulose bisphosphate carboxylase/oxygenase (Rubisco) protein from spinach leaves. Two of them are known, acting as weak agonists of the delta opioid receptor selective for the G protein signaling pathway.

== Background ==
Rubisco is a key protein in carbon fixation and is found in photosynthetic organs such as leaves in very high concentration. It usually accounts for 40% of the protein mass of a plant. With all forms of RuBisCO (not only plants, but also bacteria) taken into account, RuBisCO is possibly the most abundant type of protein on Earth.

The production of similar peptides from digestion of other species' Rubisco has not yet been reported.

== Overview ==
Studies have been conducted on rubiscolin structure and biological responses following its digestion. The tertiary structure and biological function of spinach-derived rubiscolin has been analyzed in the laboratory.

When rubiscolin is digested, studies have shown that rubiscolin has the potential to bind to δ opioid receptors in the body. The analysis of the amino acids responsible for this agonistic relationship of rubiscolin with δ opioid receptors can lead to replication of these proteins in the lab. Rubiscolin has the capability to bind to δ opioid receptors following its digestion. Rubiscolin-5 and -6 are unusual delta opioid receptor agnoists in that they mainly activate the G protein signaling pathway at the receptor, mostly leaving the β-arresting pathway alone.

== Types of rubiscolin ==
Several peptides are known to be produced after digestion of rubiscolin in various ways.

- For a key to the single-letter sequences, see Amino acid § Table of standard amino acid abbreviations and properties.
- All peptides sequences are assumed to start with NH_{2}- and end with -COOH, unless otherwise stated.

=== Rubiscolin-5 ===
- Sequence: YPLDL
- From: ?

=== Rubiscolin-6 ===
- Sequence: YPLDLF
- From: ?
- Delta opioid peptide. Can have an anxiolytic effect via activation of sigma1 and dopamine D1 receptors.

== Other bioactive Rubisco-derived peptides ==
=== MRW ===
- Sequence: MRW
- From: peptin digestion.
- Binds angiotensin-converting enzyme (ACE). Reduces the blood pressure of hypertensive rats, 2 hours after ingestion.

=== MRWRD ===
- Sequence: MRWRD
- From: peptin digestion.
- Binds angiotensin-converting enzyme (ACE). Reduces the blood pressure of hypertensive rats, 4 hours after ingestion.

=== IAYKPAG ===
- Sequence: IAYKPAG
- From: peptin digestion.
- Binds angiotensin-converting enzyme (ACE). Reduces the blood pressure of hypertensive rats, 4 hours after ingestion.

=== LRIPVA ===
- Sequence: LRIPVA
- From: peptin digestion.
- Binds angiotensin-converting enzyme (ACE). No effects on blood pressure of hypertensive rats.
