= Gliadorphin-7 =

Names
- IUPAC name L-Tyrosyl-L-prolyl-L-glutaminyl-L-prolyl-L-glutaminyl-L-prolyl-L-phenylalanine
- Other names Gluteomorphin; YPQPQPF

Identifiers
CAS Number	107936-65-2
3D model (JSmol)	Interactive image
ChemSpider	115783
PubChem CID	130932
- InChI: InChI=1S/C43H57N9O11/c44-28(23-26-12-14-27(53)15-13-26)40(59)50-20-4-9-32(50)37(56)47-29(16-18-35(45)54)41(60)51-21-5-10-33(51)38(57)48-30(17-19-36(46)55)42(61)52-22-6-11-34(52)39(58)49-31(43(62)63)24-25-7-2-1-3-8-25/h1-3,7-8,12-15,28-34,53H,4-6,9-11,16-24,44H2,(H2,45,54)(H2,46,55)(H,47,56)(H,48,57)(H,49,58)(H,62,63)/t28-,29-,30-,31-,32-,33-,34-/m0/s1 Key: QGFISQMZJLWFEE-NXBWRCJVSA-N; InChI=1/C43H57N9O11/c44-28(23-26-12-14-27(53)15-13-26)40(59)50-20-4-9-32(50)37(56)47-29(16-18-35(45)54)41(60)51-21-5-10-33(51)38(57)48-30(17-19-36(46)55)42(61)52-22-6-11-34(52)39(58)49-31(43(62)63)24-25-7-2-1-3-8-25/h1-3,7-8,12-15,28-34,53H,4-6,9-11,16-24,44H2,(H2,45,54)(H2,46,55)(H,47,56)(H,48,57)(H,49,58)(H,62,63)/t28-,29-,30-,31-,32-,33-,34-/m0/s1 Key: QGFISQMZJLWFEE-NXBWRCJVBL
- SMILES: c1ccc(cc1)C[C@@H](C(=O)O)NC(=O)[C@@H]2CCCN2C(=O)[C@H](CCC(=O)N)NC(=O)[C@@H]3CCCN3C(=O)[C@H](CCC(=O)N)NC(=O)[C@@H]4CCCN4C(=O)[C@H](Cc5ccc(cc5)O)N

Properties
Chemical formula	C_{43}H_{57}N_{9}O_{11}
Molar mass	875.981 g·mol^{−1}
- Except where otherwise noted, data are given for materials in their standard state (at 25 °C [77 °F], 100 kPa). Infobox references

Gliadorphin-7 (also known as gluteomorphin) is an opioid peptide that is formed during digestion of the gliadin component of the gluten protein. It is usually broken down into amino acids by digestion enzymes. It has been hypothesized that children with autism have abnormal leakage from the gut of this compound. This is partly the basis for the gluten-free, casein-free diet. Abnormally high levels of gliadorphin have been found in the urine of autistic children via mass spectrometry testing.
