= ASIC1 =

Protein found in humans

Identifiers
- Aliases: ASIC1, ACCN2, ASIC, BNaC2, acid sensing ion channel subunit 1
- External IDs: OMIM: 602866; MGI: 1194915; GeneCards: ASIC1

Gene location (Human)
Chr.	Chromosome 12 (human)
Band	12q13.12	Start	50,057,548 bp
Band	12q13.12	End	50,083,611 bp

Gene location (Mouse)
Chr.	Chromosome 15 (mouse)
Band	15|15 F1	Start	99,568,249 bp
Band	15|15 F1	End	99,599,011 bp
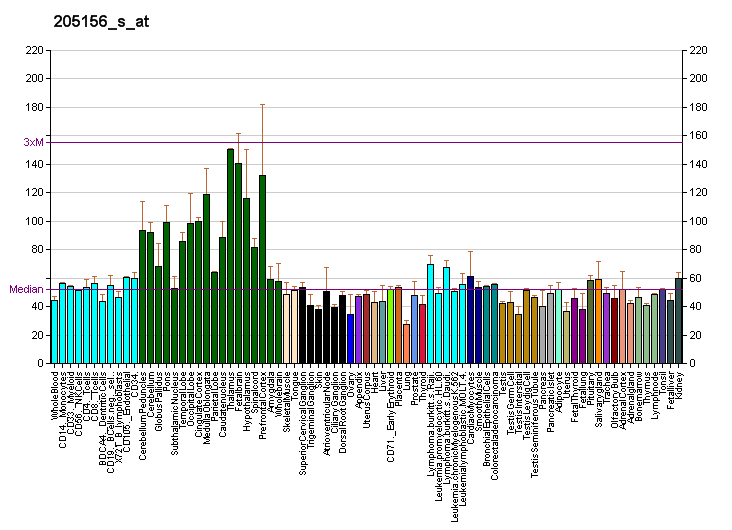

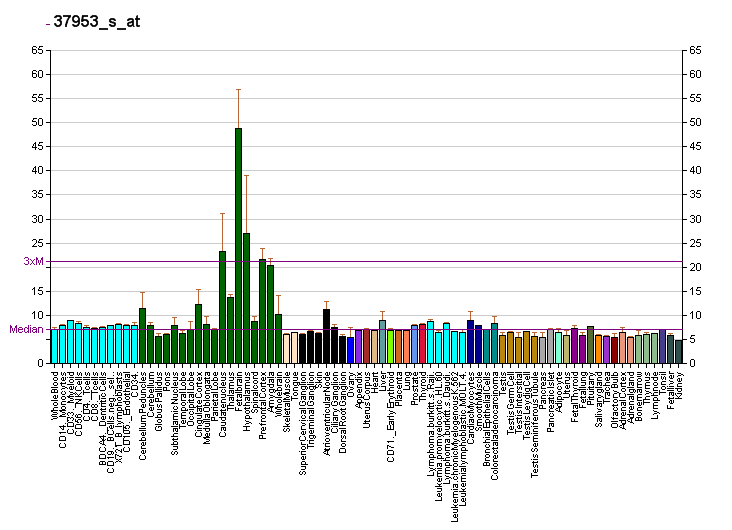
RNA expression pattern
Bgee	Human / Mouse (ortholog); Top expressed in: right hemisphere of cerebellum; ganglionic eminence; putamen; caudate nucleus; nucleus accumbens; right frontal lobe; amygdala; hypothalamus; prefrontal cortex; Brodmann area 9 / Top expressed in: superior frontal gyrus; cerebellar cortex; primary visual cortex; trigeminal ganglion; nucleus accumbens; central gray substance of midbrain; superior colliculus; Rostral migratory stream; facial motor nucleus; dentate gyrus of hippocampal formation granule cell; More reference expression data
BioGPS	More reference expression data
Gene ontology
Molecular function	ion gated channel activity; sodium channel activity; ion channel activity; protein binding; cation channel activity; ligand-gated sodium channel activity; acid-sensing ion channel activity
Cellular component	integral component of membrane; membrane; synapse; integral component of plasma membrane; cell surface; Golgi apparatus; plasma membrane
Biological process	negative regulation of neurotransmitter secretion; associative learning; sodium ion transmembrane transport; sodium ion transport; regulation of membrane potential; cation transport; memory; sensory perception of sour taste; ion transport; protein homotrimerization; ion transmembrane transport; cellular response to pH; calcium ion transmembrane transport; response to pH; signal transduction; response to acidic pH; calcium ion transport; behavioral fear response; response to amphetamine
Sources:Amigo / QuickGO
Orthologs
Databases	NCBI: entry; OMA: entry
Species	Human	Mouse
Entrez	41	11419
Ensembl	ENSG00000110881	ENSMUSG00000023017
UniProt	P78348	Q6NXK8
RefSeq (mRNA)	NM_001095; NM_001256830; NM_020039	NM_001289791; NM_009597
RefSeq (protein)	NP_001086; NP_001243759; NP_064423	NP_001276720; NP_033727
Location (UCSC)	Chr 12: 50.06 – 50.08 Mb	Chr 15: 99.57 – 99.6 Mb
PubMed search
- Wikidata
View/Edit Human	View/Edit Mouse

Acid-sensing ion channel 1 (ASIC1) also known as amiloride-sensitive cation channel 2, neuronal (ACCN2) or brain sodium channel 2 (BNaC2) is a protein that in humans is encoded by the ASIC1 gene. The ASIC1 gene is one of the five paralogous genes that encode proteins that form trimeric acid-sensing ion channels (ASICs) in mammals. The cDNA of this gene was first cloned in 1996. The ASIC genes have splicing variants that encode different proteins that are called isoforms.

These genes are mainly expressed in the central and peripheral nervous system.

ASICs can form both homotrimeric (meaning composed of three identical subunits) and heterotrimeric channels.

== Structure and function ==
This gene encodes a member of the ASIC/ENaC superfamily of proteins. The members of this family are amiloride-sensitive sodium channels that contain intracellular N and C termini, 2 hydrophobic transmembrane (TM) regions, and a large extracellular loop, which has many cysteine residues with conserved spacing. The TM regions are generally symbolized as TM1 (close to N-terminus) and TM2 (close to C-terminus).

The pore of the channel through which ions selectively flow from the extracellular side into the cytoplasm is formed by the three TM2 regions of the trimer.

== Interactions ==
ASIC1 has been shown to interact with PICK1.
