= Norbinaltorphimine =

Chemical compound

Clinical data
- ATC code: none

Legal status
- Legal status: US: Schedule II (derivative of noroxymorphone)

Identifiers
- IUPAC name: 17,17'-(Dicyclopropylmethyl)-6,6',7,7'-6,6'-imino-7,7'-bimorphinan-3,4',14,14'-tetrol
- CAS Number: 105618-26-6
- PubChem CID: 3034416
- IUPHAR/BPS: 1642
- ChemSpider: 21248347
- UNII: 36OOQ86QM1
- PDB ligand: A1AD6 (PDBe, RCSB PDB)
- CompTox Dashboard (EPA): DTXSID90897163

Chemical and physical data
- Formula: C_{40}H_{43}N_{3}O_{6}
- Molar mass: 661.799 g·mol^{−1}
- 3D model (JSmol): Interactive image
- SMILES: C1CC1CN2CC[C@]34[C@@H]5C6=C(C[C@]3([C@H]2CC7=C4C(=C(C=C7)O)O5)O)C8=C(N6)[C@H]9[C@@]12CCN([C@@H]([C@@]1(C8)O)CC1=C2C(=C(C=C1)O)O9)CC1CC1
- InChI: InChI=1S/C40H43N3O6/c44-25-7-5-21-13-27-39(46)15-23-24-16-40(47)28-14-22-6-8-26(45)34-30(22)38(40,10-12-43(28)18-20-3-4-20)36(49-34)32(24)41-31(23)35-37(39,29(21)33(25)48-35)9-11-42(27)17-19-1-2-19/h5-8,19-20,27-28,35-36,41,44-47H,1-4,9-18H2/t27-,28-,35+,36+,37+,38+,39-,40-/m1/s1; Key:APSUXPSYBJVPPS-YAUKWVCOSA-N

Norbinaltorphimine (nor-BNI or nBNI) is an opioid receptor antagonist used in scientific research. It is a highly selective inverse agonist for the κ-opioid receptor. In animals, nor-BNI blocks the effects of κ-opioids with a slow onset and an exceptionally long duration of action (up to several months). It produces antidepressant-like and anxiolytic-like effects in animal models.

== Legality ==
In the United States, a letter from Terrence L. Boos, Ph.D., Chief Drug & Chemical Evaluation Section Diversion Control Division at the DEA shows they consider nor-BNI a Schedule II substance as a derivative of noroxymorphone due to its broad definition in the CSA covering "derivatives". However, no court cases are known to exist for its prosecution and it is possible this could be challenged in court.

== See also ==
- Binaltorphimine
- 5'-Guanidinonaltrindole
- JDTic
