= 5'-Guanidinonaltrindole =

Chemical compound

Clinical data
- Other names: 5'-Guanidinonaltrindole, GNTI

Identifiers
- IUPAC name: 5'-Guanidinyl-17-(cyclopropylmethyl)-6,7-dehydro-4,5α-epoxy-3,14-dihydroxy-6,7-2',3'-indolomorphinan
- PubChem CID: 6604846
- IUPHAR/BPS: 1669
- ChemSpider: 21259050
- ChEMBL: ChEMBL330427
- CompTox Dashboard (EPA): DTXSID101018243

Chemical and physical data
- Formula: C_{27}H_{29}N_{5}O_{3}
- Molar mass: 471.561 g·mol^{−1}
- 3D model (JSmol): Interactive image
- SMILES: c1cc2c(cc1NC(=N)N)c3c([nH]2)[C@H]4[C@@]56CCN([C@@H]([C@@]5(C3)O)Cc7c6c(c(cc7)O)O4)CC8CC8
- InChI: InChI=1S/C27H29N5O3/c28-25(29)30-15-4-5-18-16(10-15)17-11-27(34)20-9-14-3-6-19(33)23-21(14)26(27,24(35-23)22(17)31-18)7-8-32(20)12-13-1-2-13/h3-6,10,13,20,24,31,33-34H,1-2,7-9,11-12H2,(H4,28,29,30)/t20-,24+,26+,27-/m1/s1; Key:VLNHDKDBGWXJEE-GYHUNEDQSA-N

5'-Guanidinonaltrindole (5'-GNTI) is an opioid antagonist used in scientific research which is highly selective for the κ opioid receptor. It is more potent and selective than the commonly used κ-opioid antagonist norbinaltorphimine. It has a slow onset and long duration of action, and produces antidepressant effects in animal studies. It also increases allodynia by interfering with the action of the κ-opioid peptide dynorphin.

In addition to activity at the KOR, 5'-GNTI has been found to act as a positive allosteric modulator of the α_{1A}-adrenergic receptor (EC_{50} = 41 nM), and this may contribute to its "severe transient effects".

== See also ==
- 6'-Guanidinonaltrindole
- Binaltorphimine
- JDTic
