= Dynorphin =

Class of opioid peptides

prodynorphin
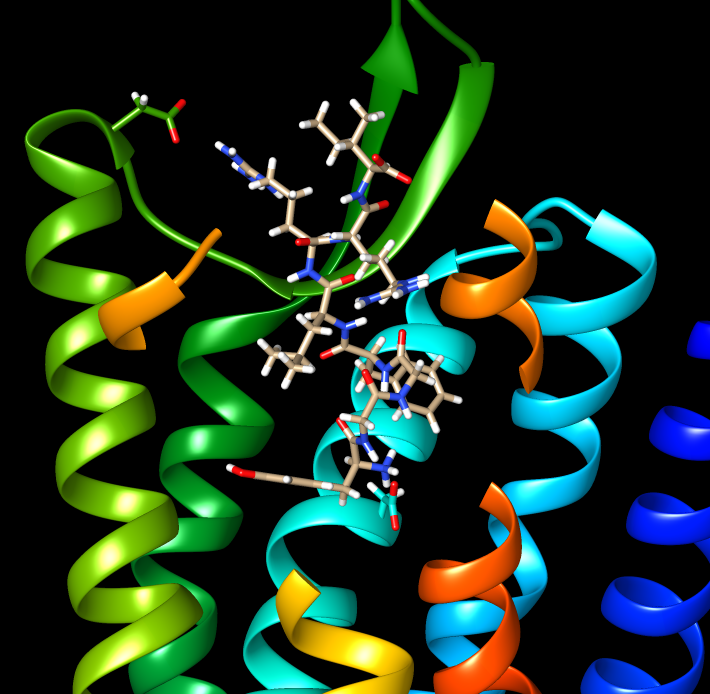
- Dynorphin in the κ-opioid receptor

Identifiers
- Symbol: PDYN
- NCBI gene: 5173
- HGNC: 8820
- OMIM: 131340
- RefSeq: NM_024411
- UniProt: P01213

Other data
- Locus: Chr. 20 pter-p12.2
Search for
- Structures: Swiss-model
- Domains: InterPro

Dynorphins (Dyn) are a class of opioid peptides that arise from the precursor protein prodynorphin. When prodynorphin is cleaved during processing by proprotein convertase 2 (PC2), multiple active peptides are released: dynorphin A, dynorphin B, and α/β-neoendorphin. Depolarization of a neuron containing prodynorphin stimulates PC2 processing, which occurs within synaptic vesicles in the presynaptic terminal. Occasionally, prodynorphin is not fully processed, leading to the release of big dynorphin, a 32-amino acid molecule consisting of both dynorphin A and dynorphin B.

Dynorphin A, dynorphin B, and big dynorphin all contain a high proportion of basic amino acid residues, in particular lysine and arginine (29.4%, 23.1%, and 31.2% basic residues, respectively), as well as many hydrophobic residues (41.2%, 30.8%, and 34.4% hydrophobic residues, respectively). Although dynorphins are found widely distributed in the CNS, they have the highest concentrations in the hypothalamus, medulla, pons, midbrain, and spinal cord. Dynorphins are stored in large (80–120 nm diameter) dense-core vesicles that are considerably larger than vesicles storing neurotransmitters. These large dense-core vesicles differ from small synaptic vesicles in that a more intense and prolonged stimulus is needed to cause the large vesicles to release their contents into the synaptic cleft. Dense-core vesicle storage is characteristic of opioid peptides storage.

The first clues to the functionality of dynorphins came from Goldstein et al. in their work with opioid peptides. The group discovered an endogenous opioid peptide in the porcine pituitary that proved difficult to isolate. By sequencing the first 13 amino acids of the peptide, they created a synthetic version of the peptide with a similar potency to the natural peptide. Goldstein et al. applied the synthetic peptide to the guinea ileum longitudinal muscle and found it to be an extraordinarily potent opioid peptide. The peptide was called dynorphin (from the Greek dynamis, meaning power) to describe its potency.

Dynorphins exert their effects primarily through the κ-opioid receptor (KOR), a G-protein-coupled receptor. Although KOR is the primary receptor for all dynorphins, the peptides do have some affinity for the μ-opioid receptor (MOR), δ-opioid receptor (DOR), and the N-methyl-D-aspartic acid (NMDA)-type glutamate receptor. Different dynorphins show different receptor selectivities and potencies at receptors. Big dynorphin and dynorphin A have the same selectivity for human KOR, but dynorphin A is more selective for KOR over MOR and DOR than is big dynorphin. Big dynorphin is more potent at KORs than is dynorphin A. Both big dynorphin and dynorphin A are more potent and more selective than dynorphin B.

== Production ==
Dynorphin is produced in many different parts of the nervous system, including the hypothalamus, the striatum, the hippocampus and the spinal cord. Gene expression patterns from the Allen Brain Atlases in mouse, macaque and humans can be seen here.

Dynorphin has many different physiological actions, depending upon its site of production.

- For example, dynorphin that is made in magnocellular vasopressin neurons of the supraoptic nucleus is important in the patterning of electrical activity. Dynorphin produced in magnocellular oxytocin neurons is a negative feedback inhibitor of oxytocin secretion.
- Dynorphin produced in the arcuate nucleus and in orexin neurons of the lateral hypothalamus affects the control of appetite.

== Analgesia ==
Dynorphin has been shown to be a modulator of pain response. Han and Xie found that injecting dynorphin into the subarachnoid space of the rat spinal cord produced dose-dependent analgesia that was measured by tail-flick latency. Analgesia was partially eliminated by opioid antagonist naloxone.

Han and Xie found dynorphin to be 6-10 times more potent than morphine on a per mole basis. In addition, morphine tolerance did not reduce dynorphin-induced analgesia. Ren et al. demonstrated some of the complexities related to dynorphin induced analgesia. The authors found that combining subanalgesic levels of morphine and dynorphin A_{1-13}, a version of dynorphin A containing only the first 13 amino acids of the peptide, in the rat spinal cord had additive effects. However, when dynorphin A_{1-13} was injected into the intracerebroventricular (ICV) region of the brain, it had an antagonist effect on morphine-induced analgesia.

A study by Lai et al. found that dynorphin might actually stimulate pain. The group found that it acts on the bradykinin receptors as well as κ-opioid receptor (KOR). The N-terminal tyrosine of dynorphin A is necessary to activate opioid receptors such as KOR, but is unnecessary in binding to bradykinin receptors. Lai et al. studied the effects of dynorphin A_{2-13} that did not contain the N-terminal tyrosine. Based on the results of dynorphin A_{2-13}, the authors proposed a mechanism in which dynorphin A activates bradykinin receptors and thus stimulates pain response.

According to this mechanism, dynorphin activates bradykinin receptors, which triggers the release of calcium ions into the cell through voltage-sensitive channels in the cell membrane. Blocking bradykinin receptors in the lumbar region of the spinal cord reversed persistent pain. A multiple pathway system might help explain the conflicting effects of dynorphin in the CNS.

Svensson et al. provided another possible mechanism by which dynorphin might cause pain in the spinal cord. The authors found that administration of truncated dynorphin A_{2-17}, which does not bind to opioid receptors, causes an increase in phosphorylated p38 mitogen-activated protein kinases (MAPK) in microglia in the dorsal horn of the spinal cord. Activated p38 has been previously linked to the NMDA-evoked prostaglandin release, which causes pain. Thus, dynorphin could also induce pain in the spinal cord through a non-opioid p38 pathway.

Other studies have identified a role for dynorphin and KOR stimulation in neuropathic pain. This same group also showed that the dynorphin-KOR system mediates astrocyte proliferation through the activation of p38 MAPK that was required for the effects of neuropathic pain on analgesic responses. Taken together, these reports suggest that dynorphin can elicit multiple effects on both KOR, and non-opioid pathways to modulate analgesic responses.

== Addiction ==
Cocaine addiction results from complex molecular changes in the brain following multiple exposures to cocaine. Dynorphins have been shown to be an important part of this process. Although a single exposure to cocaine does not affect brain dynorphin levels, repeated exposures to the drug increases dynorphin concentrations in the striatum and substantia nigra in rats.

One proposed molecular mechanism for increased dynorphin levels involves transcriptional regulation by CREB (3’, 5’-monophosphate response element binding protein). According to the model proposed by Carlezon et al., use of cocaine increases the expression of cAMP and cAMP-dependent protein kinase (PKA). PKA leads to the activation of CREB, which increases the expression of dynorphin in the nucleus accumbens and dorsal striatum, brain areas important in addiction. Dynorphin decreases dopamine release by binding to KORs on dopamine nerve terminals.

=== Cocaine ===
Carlezon et al. performed several experiments to validate this model. They found that, when mice were injected with cocaine, they preferred to be in the place where they were injected (showed stronger place preference) significantly more than control mice (injected with saline) did. However, in mice overexpressing CREB under a constitutive promoter, place aversion was observed. This indicates that increasing CREB reverses the positive effects of cocaine. Northern blot analysis several days after CREB overexpression showed a marked increase in dynorphin mRNA in the nucleus accumbens.

Blocking KORs with an antagonist (nor-BNI) blocked the aversive effects caused by CREB overexpression. Thus, cocaine use ultimately appears to lead to an increase in the transcription of prodynorphin mRNA. Dynorphin inhibits dopamine release, which could account the reinforcing properties of cocaine.

There is also evidence suggesting that increased amounts of dynorphin can protect humans from cocaine addiction. According to research at Rockefeller University, the gene for dynorphin is present in two versions: a “high output” and a “low output” functional variation. The high output functional variation of the gene contains polymorphisms in the promoter regions that are speculated to cause it to produce more copies of dynorphin mRNA, which would give people carrying this variation a “built-in defense system” against drug addiction.

== Stress and depression ==
Land et al. first described a mechanism of dysphoria in which corticotropin-releasing factor (CRF) provokes dynorphin release. While control mice displayed aversive behaviors in response to forced swim tests and foot shocks, mice lacking dynorphin did not show any such signs of aversion. They noted that injecting CRF led to aversive behaviors in mice with functional genes for dynorphin even in the absence of stress, but not in those with dynorphin gene deletions. Place aversion was eliminated when the receptor CRF_{2} was blocked with an antagonist.

Together these results led Land et al. to conclude that dysphoric elements of stress occur when CRF_{2} stimulates dynorphin release and activates κ-opioid receptor (KOR). The group further postulated that this pathway might be involved in drug seeking behavior. In support of this, it was shown previously that stress can reinstate cocaine-seeking behavior in mice through a CRF mechanism.

Dynorphin has also been shown to influence drug seeking behavior and is required for stress-induced, but not prime-induced, reinstatement of cocaine seeking. A downstream element of this pathway was later identified by Bruchas et al. The authors found that KOR activates p38, a member of the mitogen-activated protein kinase (MAPK) family, through phosphorylation. Activation of p38 is necessary to produce KOR-dependent behaviors.

Because of its role in mediating dysphoria, dynorphin has also been investigated in relation to depression. Newton et al. studied the effects of CREB and dynorphin on learned helplessness (an animal model for depression) in mice. Overexpression of dominant negative CREB (mCREB) in transgenic mice had an antidepressant effect (in terms of behavior), whereas overexpressing wild-type CREB caused an increase in depression-like symptoms. As described previously, CREB increases transcription of prodynorphin, which gives rise to different dynorphin subtypes. Newton et al. supported this mechanism, as the mCREB was colocalized with decreased expression of prodynorphin. Also, direct antagonism of dynorphin caused antidepressant-like effects similar to those seen with mCREB expression. Thus, the CREB-dynorphin pathway regulates mood as well as cocaine rewards.

Shirayama et al. used several animal depression models in rats to describe the effects of dynorphins A and B in depression. The authors found that learned helplessness increases the levels of dynorphins A and B in the hippocampus and nucleus accumbens and that injecting KOR antagonist nor-BNI induces recovery from learned helplessness. Immobilization stress causes increases in the levels of both dynorphins A and B in the hippocampus and nucleus accumbens. Forced swim stress increases the levels of dynorphin A in the hippocampus. Shirayama et al. concluded that both dynorphins A and B were important in stress response. The authors proposed several mechanisms to account for the effects of the KOR antagonist norBNI on learned helplessness. First, increased dynorphin levels block the release of glutamate, a neurotransmitter involved in plasticity in the hippocampus, which would inhibit new learning.

Blocking dynorphin effects would allow glutamate to be released and restore functional plasticity in the hippocampus, reversing the phenomenon of learned helplessness. In addition, blocking dynorphin would enhance dopamine signaling and thus reduce depressive symptoms associated with stress. The authors suggest that KOR antagonists might have potential in treating depression in humans.

== Appetite and circadian rhythms ==
Dynorphins are important in maintaining homeostasis through appetite control and circadian rhythms. Przewlocki et al. found that, during the day, dynorphins are naturally elevated in the neurointermediate lobe of the pituitary (NI pituitary) and depressed in the hypothalamus. This pattern is reversed at night. In addition, mice deprived of food and water, or of water alone, had increased levels of dynorphin in the hypothalamus during the day. Deprivation of water alone also decreased the dynorphin levels in the NI pituitary. These findings led Przewlocki et al. to conclude that dynorphins are essential in maintaining homeostasis.

Dynorphin has been implicated as an appetite stimulant. A number of studies in rats have shown that increasing the dynorphin levels stimulates eating. Opioid antagonists, such as naloxone, can reverse the effects of elevated dynorphin. This inhibition is especially strong in obese animals or animals that have access to particularly appealing food. Inui et al. found that administering dynorphin to dogs increased both their food and water intake.

Dynorphin plays a role in the eating behavior of hibernating animals. Nizeilski et al. examined dynorphin levels in the ground squirrel, which undergoes periods of excessive eating and periods of starvation before winter. They found that dynorphin levels increased during the starvation periods. Berman et al. studied the levels of dynorphin during periods of food restriction. The group found that while food did not alter the expression of dynorphin B, it increases dynorphin A levels in several rat brain regions (hypothalamus, nucleus accumbens, and bed nucleus of the stria terminalis).

Recent research on dynorphin knockout mice did not find differences between knockout and control animals in food intake, but found that fat storage was reduced in male knockout mice. Fatty acids were oxidized more quickly in knockout animals.

Studies have also shown that ingesting a high-fat diet increases the gene expression of dynorphin in the hypothalamus. Thus, dynorphin may cause overeating when a high-fat diet is available. Morley & Levine were the first to describe the role of opioid peptides in stress-related eating. In their study, mice had their tails pinched (causes stress), which induced eating. Stress-related eating was reduced by injecting naloxone, an opioid peptide antagonist.

Mandenoff et al. proposed that, although endogenous opioids are not necessary to maintain body weight and energy expenditure under predictable circumstances, they become activated under stressful conditions. They found that endogenous opioids, such as dynorphin, stimulate appetite and decrease energy expenditure. Taken together, the studies above suggest an important evolutionary mechanism in which more food is eaten, more nutrients are stored, and less energy is expended by an organism during times of stress.

== Temperature regulation ==
In addition to their role in weight control, dynorphins have been found to regulate body temperature. Opioid peptides were first investigated in hyperthermia, where it was found that μ-opioid receptor (MOR) agonists stimulate this response when injected into the periaqueductal gray (PAG) region of the brain. Xin et al. showed that delivery of dynorphin A_{1-17} (a KOR agonist) through microdialysis into the PAG region induced hypothermia in rats. The authors found that the severity of hypothermia was proportional to the dose of dynorphin A_{1-17} administered. Hypothermia could be prevented by administering KOR antagonist nor-BNI to the rat. Xin et al. hypothesized that while MOR agonists mediate hyperthermia, KOR agonists, such as dynorphin, mediate hypothermia.

Sharma and Alm found that subjecting rats to heat (38˚C) caused dynorphins to be upregulated in the cerebral cortex, hippocampus, cerebellum, and the brain stem. Further, authors found that administration of nitric oxide synthase (NOS) inhibitors reduced dynorphin A_{1-17} levels in the brain and attenuated symptoms related to heat stress. Sharma and Alm concluded that hyperthermia increases dynorphin levels, which may cause damage and promote heat stress reaction. They further hypothesized that nitric oxide was part of this mechanism. Ansonoff et al. found that hypothermic effects are mediated through K1 (κ-opioid receptor 1), but not K2. The authors applied a KOR agonist to K1 knockout mice, which eliminated hypothermic response.Thus, K2 does not appear to have a role in the hypothermic mechanism.

== Clinical significance ==
Dynorphin derivatives are generally considered to be of little clinical use because of their very short duration of action.

== See also ==
- κ-Opioid receptor agonist
