= Endomorphin =

Endomorphin-1

Names
- IUPAC name (2S)-1-[(2S)-2-amino-3-(4-hydroxyphenyl)propanoyl]-N-[(2S)-1-[[(2S)-1-amino-1-oxo-3-phenylpropan-2-yl]amino]-3-(1H-indol-3-yl)-1-oxopropan-2-yl]pyrrolidine-2-carboxamide
- Other names Tyr-Pro-Trp-Phe-NH_{2}; L-Tyrosyl-L-prolyl-L-tryptophyl-L-phenylalaninamide

Identifiers
CAS Number	189388-22-5
3D model (JSmol)	Interactive image
Abbreviations	YPWF
ChEBI	CHEBI:177580
ChEMBL	ChEMBL316446
ChemSpider	4470614
IUPHAR/BPS	1623
PubChem CID	5311080
- InChI: InChI=1S/C34H38N6O5/c35-26(17-22-12-14-24(41)15-13-22)34(45)40-16-6-11-30(40)33(44)39-29(19-23-20-37-27-10-5-4-9-25(23)27)32(43)38-28(31(36)42)18-21-7-2-1-3-8-21/h1-5,7-10,12-15,20,26,28-30,37,41H,6,11,16-19,35H2,(H2,36,42)(H,38,43)(H,39,44)/t26-,28-,29-,30-/m0/s1 Key: ZEXLJFNSKAHNFH-SYKYGTKKSA-N
- SMILES: C1C[C@H](N(C1)C(=O)[C@H](CC2=CC=C(C=C2)O)N)C(=O)N[C@@H](CC3=CNC4=CC=CC=C43)C(=O)N[C@@H](CC5=CC=CC=C5)C(=O)N

Properties
Chemical formula	C_{34}H_{38}N_{6}O_{5}
Molar mass	610.715 g·mol^{−1}
- Except where otherwise noted, data are given for materials in their standard state (at 25 °C [77 °F], 100 kPa). Infobox references

Endomorphin-2

Names
- IUPAC name (2S)-1-[(2S)-2-amino-3-(4-hydroxyphenyl)propanoyl]-N-[(2S)-1-[[(2S)-1-amino-1-oxo-3-phenylpropan-2-yl]amino]-1-oxo-3-phenylpropan-2-yl]pyrrolidine-2-carboxamide
- Other names Tyr-Pro-Phe-Phe-NH_{2}; L-Tyrosyl-L-prolyl-L-phenylalanyl-L-phenylalaninamide

Identifiers
CAS Number	141801-26-5
3D model (JSmol)	Interactive image
ChEMBL	ChEMBL333357
ChemSpider	4470615
IUPHAR/BPS	3668
PubChem CID	5311081
UNII	3PH5M0466G
- InChI: InChI=1S/C32H37N5O5/c33-25(18-23-13-15-24(38)16-14-23)32(42)37-17-7-12-28(37)31(41)36-27(20-22-10-5-2-6-11-22)30(40)35-26(29(34)39)19-21-8-3-1-4-9-21/h1-6,8-11,13-16,25-28,38H,7,12,17-20,33H2,(H2,34,39)(H,35,40)(H,36,41)/t25-,26-,27-,28-/m0/s1 Key: XIJHWXXXIMEHKW-LJWNLINESA-N
- SMILES: C1C[C@H](N(C1)C(=O)[C@H](CC2=CC=C(C=C2)O)N)C(=O)N[C@@H](CC3=CC=CC=C3)C(=O)N[C@@H](CC4=CC=CC=C4)C(=O)N

Properties
Chemical formula	C_{32}H_{37}N_{5}O_{5}
Molar mass	571.678 g·mol^{−1}
- Except where otherwise noted, data are given for materials in their standard state (at 25 °C [77 °F], 100 kPa). Infobox references

Endomorphins are natural, endogenous opioid neuropeptides that are considered to be central to pain relief. They were first described in 1997 by James Zadina, Abba Kastin and colleagues. The two known endomorphins, endomorphin-1 and endomorphin-2, are tetrapeptides, consisting of Tyr-Pro-Trp-Phe and Tyr-Pro-Phe-Phe amino acid sequences respectively. These sequences fold into tertiary structures with high specificity and affinity for the μ-opioid receptor, binding it exclusively and strongly. Bound μ-opioid receptors typically induce inhibitory effects on neuronal activity. Endomorphin-like immunoreactivity exists within the central and peripheral nervous systems, where endomorphin-1 appears to be concentrated in the brain and upper brainstem, and endomorphin-2 is located mainly in the spinal cord and lower brainstem. Because endomorphins activate the μ-opioid receptor, which is the target receptor of morphine and its derivatives, endomorphins possess significant potential as analgesics with reduced side effects and risk of addiction.

== Opioids and receptors ==
Endomorphins belong to the opioid class of neuropeptides (protein neurotransmitters). Opioids are ligands that bind to opioid receptors and exist both as endogenous substances that are generated within the organism and as synthetic molecules. Endogenous opioids include endorphins, enkephalins, dynorphins, and endomorphins.

Transcription and translation of opioid-encoding genes results in the formation of pre-propeptide opioid precursors, which are modified in the endoplasmic reticulum to become propeptide opioid precursors, transferred to the golgi apparatus, and further modified into the opioid product. The exact pre-propeptide precursors of endomorphins have not been identified. Because the precursors have never been identified and the mechanisms by which the endomorphins are produced have never been clarified, the status of endomorphins as endogenous opioid ligands has to be considered tentative.

Opioid receptors belong to the G protein-coupled receptor family and include μ, κ, δ, and nociceptinorphanin-FQ receptors. While activation of opioid receptors initiates a diverse array of responses, opioids typically serve as depressants, and are widely used and developed as analgesics. Additionally, opioid malfunction has been linked to schizophrenia and autism. Endomorphins demonstrate high selectivity and affinity for the μ-opioid receptor, which functions in pain relief and intoxication.

== Structure ==
Both endomorphins-1 and 2 are tetrapeptides, consisting of four amino acids. Endomorphin-1 has the amino acid sequence of Tyr-Pro-Trp-Phe, while endomorphin-2 has a sequence of Tyr-Pro-Phe-Phe. The specific amino acids in these sequences dictate the folding and resultant behavior, namely the ability to bind μ-opioid receptors, of these molecules.

== Function ==
Endomorphins are involved in a variety of functions. Mechanistically, they bind inhibitory μ-opioid G-protein receptors, which act to close calcium ion channels and open potassium ion channels in the membranes of bound neurons. The elimination of calcium influx and facilitation of potassium ion efflux prevents neuronal depolarization, inhibits the generation of action potentials, and depresses the activity of excitatory neurons. In other instances, the binding of endomorphins causes excitation, where its activation of phospholipase C and adenylyl cyclase initiates an increase in calcium ion concentration, cellular depolarization, and the release of norepinephrine and serotonin.

The specific roles of endomorphins largely remain undetermined and depend upon the pathway in question. Opioid systems influence the physiological processes of pain, reward, and stress. They also play roles in immune responses and the functions of the gastrointestinal, respiratory, cardiovascular, and neuroendocrine systems.

The concentration and resultant effect of most neurotransmitters, including endomorphins, is dictated by rates of synthesis and degradation. Degradation involves the breakdown of functional molecules to defective configurations or parts, thereby reducing the total activity of the molecule type. The enzyme, DPP IV, cleaves endomorphin into defective parts, thus regulating endomorphin activity.

== Location ==
Using radioimmunoassay and immunocytochemistry, endomorphins have been localized within the nervous systems of humans, mice, rats, and monkeys. Both endomorphin tetrapeptides are abundant in the human neocortex. Endomorphin-1 can be found in the hypothalamus and thalamus of the diencephalon, and in the striatum and lateral septum of the telencephalon. In the hindbrain, endomorphin-1-reactive neurons are more abundant than are those immunoreactive for endomorphin-2. Endomorphin-2 is predominantly found in the spinal cord, specifically in presynaptic terminals of afferent neurons in the dorsal horn region. It has been found co-localized with calcitonin and with the pain-conveying neurotransmitter, substance P. Neither endomorphin-1 nor endomorphin-2 has been identified in the amygdala or the hippocampus.

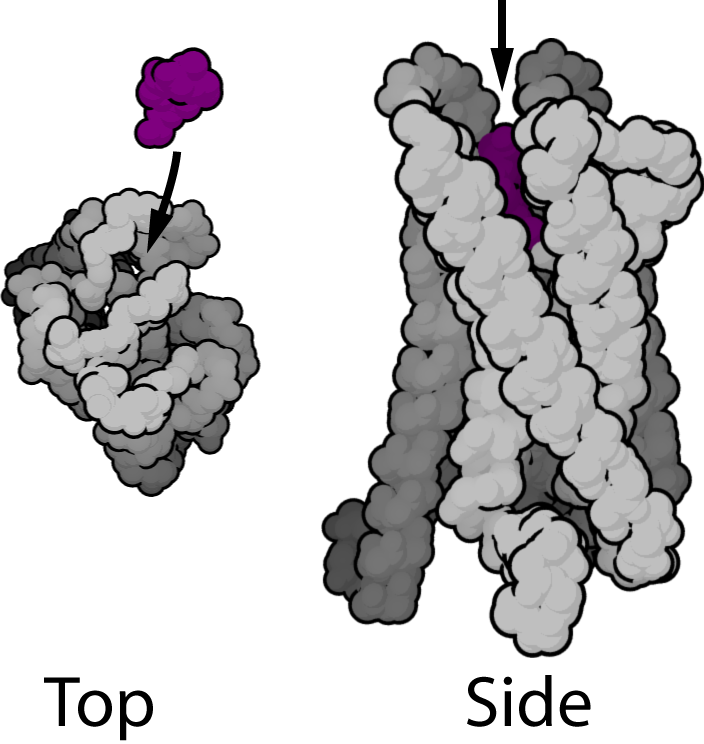
μ-opioid Receptor

== Clinical application ==
In addition to endomorphins, morphine and morphine-like opiates target the μ-opioid receptor. Thus, endomorphins have significant potential as analgesics and morphine substitutes. In vitro assessment of endomorphins as analgesics reveals similar behavior to morphine and other opiates, where drug tolerance leads to dependence and addiction. Other side effects common to opiates such as vasodilation, respiratory depression, urinary retention, and gastrointestinal reaction develop. However, the endomorphin-induced side effects are slightly less severe than are those of the morphine-derived analgesics commonly used today. Additionally, endomorphins potentially produce more powerful analgesic effects than their morphine-derived counterparts.

Despite their potential utility as pharmaceutical agents, the low membrane permeability and vulnerability to enzymatic degradation of endomorphins limit their incorporation into drugs. As a result, endomorphin analogues are being generated to allow transport across the blood brain barrier, increase stability, and reduce side effects. Two endomorphin modifications that approach these problems include glycosylation and lipidation. Glycosylation adds carbohydrate groups to the endomorphin molecules, allowing them to pass membranes via glucose transporters. Lipidation adds lipoamino acids or fatty acids to the endomorphin molecules, increasing hydrophobicity and, therefore, membrane permeability of the molecules.
