= Gluten exorphin =

Group of opioid peptides

Gluten exorphins are a group of opioid peptides formed during the digestion of the gluten protein. These peptides work as external regulators for gastrointestinal movement and hormonal release. The breakdown of gliadin, a polymer of wheat proteins, creates amino acids that stop the gluten epitopes from entering the immune system to activate inflammatory reactions. During this process, gluten does not fully break down, thus increasing the presence of gluten exorphins. Because of this, researchers think this is what might lead to various diseases.

Research shows the benefits of gluten- and casein-free diets for people with diseases and disorders connected to gluten exorphins. The mechanism behind this is still unknown. There is a possibility that gluten has deleterious effects on the human digestive system. When people are more susceptible to gluten and casein allergies, the weakened intestinal lining allows gluten exorphin to flow.

== Names ==
Gluten exorphins produced by digestion of gliadin is called gliadorphin.

== Known members ==
- For a key to the single-letter sequences, see Amino acid § Table of standard amino acid abbreviations and properties.
- All peptides sequences are assumed to start with NH_{2}- and end with -COOH, unless otherwise stated.

=== Gluten exorphin A4 ===
- Structure: GYYP
- Part of wheat glutenin sequence.

=== Gluten exorphin A5 ===
- Structure: GYYPT
- Chemical formula: C_{29}H_{37}N_{5}O_{9}
- Molecular weight: 599.64 g/mol
- Part of wheat glutenin sequence.

=== Gluten exorphin B4 ===
- Structure: YGGW
- Chemical formula: C_{24}H_{27}N_{5}O_{6}
- Molecular weight: 481.50 g/mol

=== Gluten exorphin B5 ===
- Structure: YGGWL
- Chemical formula: C_{30}H_{38}N_{6}O_{7}
- Molecular weight: 594.66 g/mol

=== Gluten exorphin C/C5 ===
- Structure: YPISL
- Chemical formula: C_{29}H_{45}N_{5}O_{8}
- Molecular weight: 591.70 g/mol

=== Gliadorphin-7 ===
- Structure: YPQPQPF
- Part of wheat gliadin sequence.

== Clinical significance ==
Recent research surrounding gluten exorphins has revolved around how the peptides might play a role in various diseases and disorders.

=== Celiac disease ===
In response to gluten, people with celiac disease will release gluten exorphins as part of the allergic immune response. Due to the weakening of intestinal walls caused by celiac disease, some of these gluten exorphins can make their way through the lining of the intestines and are then absorbed into the bloodstream.
