= 6'-Guanidinonaltrindole =

6′-Guanidinonaltrindole

Names
- IUPAC name N-[17-(Cyclopropylmethyl)-3,14-dihydroxy-1′H-4,5α-epoxyindolo[2′,3′:6,7]morphinan-6′-yl]guanidine
- Systematic IUPAC name N-[(4bS,8R,8aS,14bR)-7-(Cyclopropylmethyl)-1,8a-dihydroxy-5,6,7,8,8a,9,14,14b-octahydro-4,8-methano[1]benzofuro[2,3-b]pyrido[4,3-c]carbazol-12-yl]guanidine

Identifiers
CAS Number	350693-06-0
3D model (JSmol)	Interactive image
ChEMBL	ChEMBL610279
ChemSpider	24674392
PubChem CID	9912633
- InChI: InChI=1S/C27H29N5O3/c28-25(29)30-15-4-5-16-17-11-27(34)20-9-14-3-6-19(33)23-21(14)26(27,7-8-32(20)12-13-1-2-13)24(35-23)22(17)31-18(16)10-15/h3-6,10,13,20,24,31,33-34H,1-2,7-9,11-12H2,(H4,28,29,30)/t20-,24+,26+,27-/m1/s1 Key: XDKOGAAFSBGLBO-GYHUNEDQSA-N
- SMILES: c1cc2c(cc1NC(=N)N)[nH]c3c2CC4(C5Cc6ccc(c7c6C4(C3O7)CCN5CC8CC8)O)O

Properties
Chemical formula	C_{27}H_{29}N_{5}O_{3}
Molar mass	471.561 g·mol^{−1}
- Except where otherwise noted, data are given for materials in their standard state (at 25 °C [77 °F], 100 kPa). Infobox references

6′-Guanidinonaltrindole (6′-GNTI) is a κ–δ-opioid receptor selective ligand used in scientific research.

With 6′-GNTI, evidence was provided for the first time that receptor oligomerization plays functional role in living organisms.

6′-GNTI is an extremely biased agonist of the κ-opioid receptor. It is a potent partial agonist of the G protein pathway but does not recruit the β-arrestin pathway. Due to its functional selectivity for the G protein pathway, 6′-GNTI functions as an antagonist of nonbiased KOR agonists on the β-arrestin pathway. It is thought that 6′-GTNI may be able to produce analgesia without dysphoria and with a lower incidence of tolerance.

== See also ==
- 5′-Guanidinonaltrindole
- RB-64
- Noribogaine
- ICI-199,441
