= Prodynorphin =

Polypeptide hormone

Prodynorphin, also known as proenkephalin B, is an opioid polypeptide hormone involved with chemical signal transduction and cell communication. The gene for prodynorphin is expressed in the endometrium and the striatum, and its gene map locus is 20pter-p12. Prodynorphin is a basic building-block of dynorphins, the chemical messengers in the brain that appear most heavily involved in the anticipation and experience of pain, stress responses, as well appetite and temperature regulation, as well as neoendorphins.

The gene is thought to influence perception, as well as susceptibility to drug dependence, and is expressed more readily in human beings than in other primates.

== Evolutionary implications ==
Most humans have multiple copies of the regulatory gene sequence for prodynorphin, which is virtually identical among all primates, whereas other primates have only a single copy. In addition, most Asian populations have two copies of the gene sequence for prodynorphin, whereas East Africas, Middle Easterners, and Europeans tend to have three repetitions.

The extent of regulatory gene disparities for prodynorphin, between human and primates, has gained the attention of scientists. There are very few genes known to be directly related to mankind's speciation from other great apes. According to computational biologist researcher Matthew W. Hahn of Indiana University, "this is the first documented instance of a neural gene that has had its regulation shaped by natural selection during human origins."

The prodynorphin polypeptide is identical in humans and chimpanzees, but the regulatory promoter sequences have been shown to exhibit marked differences. According to Hahn, "humans have the ability to turn on this gene more easily and more intensely than other primates", a reason why regulation of this gene may have been important in the evolution of modern humans' mental capacity.

== See also ==
- Dynorphin
- Proenkephalin
- Proopiomelanocortin (POMC)
