= Casomorphin =

Chemical compound

Bovine β-casomorphin 7, a casomorphin, has seven amino acids in its peptide sequence.

Casomorphin is an opioid peptide (protein fragment) derived from the digestion of the milk protein casein.

== Health ==
Digestive enzymes can break casein down into peptides that have some biological activity in cells and in laboratory animals though conclusive causal effects on humans have not been established.

If opioid peptides breach the intestinal barrier, typically linked to permeability and constrained biosynthesis of dipeptidyl peptidase-4 (DPP4), they can attach to opioid receptors. Elucidation requires a systemic framework that acknowledges that public-health effects of food-derived opioids are complex with varying genetic susceptibility and confounding factors, together with system-wide interactions and feedbacks.

== List of known casomorphins (non-exhaustive) ==
=== β-Casomorphins 1–3 ===
- Structure: YPF
- Chemical formula: C_{23}H_{27}N_{3}O_{5}
- Molecular weight: 425.48 g/mol

=== Bovine β-casomorphins 1–4 ===
- Structure: YPFPGP
- Chemical formula: C_{28}H_{35}N_{4}O_{6}
- Molecular weight: 522.61 g/mol

=== Bovine β-casomorphin 1–4, amide ===
- Structure: YPFP-NH_{2}
- Chemical formula: C_{28}H_{35}N_{5}O_{5}
- Molecular weight: 521.6 g/mol

=== Bovine β-casomorphin 5 ===
- Structure: YPFPG
- Chemical formula: C_{30}H_{37}N_{5}O_{7}
- Molecular weight: 594.66 g/mol

=== Bovine β-casomorphin 7 ===
- Structure: YPFPGPI
- Chemical formula: C_{41}H_{55}N_{7}O_{9}
- Molecular weight: 789.9 g/mol

bBCM7 is produced in when digesting bovine A1 beta-casein outside of the body using pancreatic enzymes, and inside of some animal bodies. The A2 form, which follows Ile with a Pro instead of a His, is more resistant to the release of bBCM7, presumably because the proline residue blocks the action of a carboxyl peptidase. bBCM7 has significant opioid effects when injected (and in more recent research, orally fed) into animals, but human studies supporting the use of "bBCM7-free" A2 milk is still lacking.

=== Human β-casomorphin 7 ===
- Structure: YPFVQPI

Despite human beta-casein having a A2-like "P" after "I", human colostrum and early lactation-stage milk contains significant amounts of hBCM7. It is a much weaker opioid and the FVQ sequence renders it susceptible to further degradation.

=== Bovine β-casomorphin 8 ===
- Structure: YPFPGPIX
- Chemical formula (A2): C_{46}H_{62}N_{8}O_{10}
- Molecular weight (A2): 887.00 g/mol

X is H (histidine) in A1 and P (proline) in A2.

=== Bovine β-casomorphin 9 ===
- Structure: YPFPGPIXN

X is H (histidine) in A1 and P (proline) in A2.

Produced from both A1 and A2. Opioid agonist, but apparently without the detrimental effect of bBCM7 in cell cultures and animal models, and in fact considered potentially beneficial.

== Other bioactive casein-derived peptides ==
- PGPIPN is beneficial to mice.
