= Protein precursor =

Protein which after translation is cleaved into one or more smaller proteins

A protein precursor, also called a pro-protein or pro-peptide, is an inactive protein (or peptide) that can be turned into an active form by post-translational modification, such as breaking off a piece of the molecule or adding on another molecule. The name of the precursor for a protein is often prefixed by pro-. Examples include proinsulin and proopiomelanocortin, which are both prohormones.

Protein precursors are often used by an organism when the subsequent protein is potentially harmful, but needs to be available on short notice and/or in large quantities. Enzyme precursors are called zymogens or proenzymes. Examples are enzymes of the digestive tract in humans.

Some protein precursors are secreted from the cell. Many of these are synthesized with an N-terminal signal peptide that targets them for secretion. Like other proteins that contain a signal peptide, their name is prefixed by pre. They are thus called pre-pro-proteins or pre-pro-peptides. The signal peptide is cleaved off in the endoplasmic reticulum. An example is preproinsulin.

Pro-sequences are areas in the protein that are essential for its correct folding, usually in the transition of a protein from an inactive to an active state. Pro-sequences may also be involved in pro-protein transport and secretion.

Pro-domain (or prodomain) is the domain of a proprotein.
