= List of compounds with carbon numbers 50+ =

This is a partial list of molecules that contain at least 50 carbon atoms.

== C_{50}–C_{52} ==
Chemical formula	Synonyms	CAS number
C_{50}H_{28}	dodecahelicene	57468-46-9
C_{50}H_{32}N_{8}O_{17}S_{5}Na_{5}	Direct Black 75	2679-49-4
C_{50}H_{41}NO_{11}S	AR-1A0991	20702-83-4
C_{50}H_{48}O_{4}	violanthrone-79	85652-50-2
C_{50}H_{49}N_{15}O_{15}S	geninthiocin	158792-27-9
C_{50}H_{50}N_{14}O_{9}S_{6}	amythiamicin C	156620-47-2
C_{50}H_{51}N_{15}O_{8}S_{6}	amythiamicin A	152741-89-4
C_{50}H_{53}N_{15}O_{9}S_{6}	amythiamicin B	156620-48-3
C_{50}H_{57}N_{3}O_{12}	NCI 144-128	36674-84-7
C_{50}H_{60}O_{10}	ergophilone A	166603-97-0
C_{50}H_{60}ClO_{16}	apidiothricin	212071-76-6
C_{50}H_{63}N_{9}O_{10}	linopristin	325965-23-9
C_{50}H_{64}O_{4}	decaprenoastaxanthin	101528-35-2
C_{50}H_{66}O_{8}	Hostanox O3	32509-66-3
C_{50}H_{68}N_{14}O_{10}	bremelanotide	189691-06-3
C_{50}H_{69}N_{15}O_{9}	melanotan II	121062-08-6
C_{50}H_{70}O_{2}	demethylmenaquinone 8	29790-47-4
C_{50}H_{72}O_{2}	sarcinaxanthin	11031-47-3
C_{50}H_{73}N_{15}O_{11}	bradykinin	58-82-2
C_{50}H_{73}CoN_{13}O_{8}	etiocobalamin	27792-36-5
C_{50}H_{74}O_{14}	doramecin	117704-25-3
C_{50}H_{76}O_{6}	hydroperoxycadiforin	171527-89-2
C_{50}H_{80}N_{14}O_{14}S	neurokinin A	86933-74-6
C_{50}H_{82}O_{22}	ophiopogoside A	171527-89-2
C_{50}H_{83}NO_{21}	tomatine	17406-45-0
C_{50}H_{84}O_{19}	quinquenoside III	208764-53-8
C_{50}H_{84}O_{21}	scammonin	131747-25-6
C_{50}H_{86}O_{22}	tricolorin C	183476-42-8
C_{50}H_{88}NCl	dimethylbis(phenylstearyl)ammoniumchloride	25497-36-3
C_{50}H_{92}O_{14}	glucolipsin A	222613-92-5
C_{50}H_{93}NO_{9}	agelasphin-12	155419-37-7
C_{50}H_{98}O_{4}	didocosyl adipate	65540-77-4
C_{50}H_{99}NO_{10}	agelasphin-13	155419-38-8
C_{50}H_{100}O_{2}	pentacontanoic acid	40710-30-3
C_{50}H_{102}	pentacontane	6596-40-3
C_{51}H_{34}N_{6}Na_{6}O_{23}S_{6}	suramin hexasodium	129-46-4
C_{51}H_{38}N_{2}	LumTec E105	1033035-83-4
C_{51}H_{40}N_{6}O_{23}S_{6}	suramin	145-63-1
C_{51}H_{42}Pd_{2}O_{3}	Tris(dibenzylideneacetone)dipalladium	51364-51-3
C_{51}H_{48}O_{15}	NSC 314300	73113-86-7
C_{51}H_{50}O_{21}	vanicoside A	155179-22-9
C_{51}H_{51}N_{15}O_{15}S	barninamycin A	58798-97-3
C_{51}H_{57}NO_{18}	protaxel	186040-50-6
C_{51}H_{64}N_{12}O_{12}S_{2}	echinomycin	512-64-1
C_{51}H_{76}N_{8}O_{9}S	cyclolinopeptide E	222527-67-5
C_{51}H_{78}O_{8}	staphyloxanthin	71869-01-7
C_{51}H_{79}NO_{13}	sirolimus	53123-88-9
C_{51}H_{80}O_{18}	ziziphin	73667-51-3
C_{51}H_{81}ClN_{14}O_{17}	syringomycin A1	124629-88-5
C_{51}H_{82}O_{20}	polyphyllin F	76926-74-7
C_{51}H_{82}O_{21}	mesennin	25480-74-4
C_{51}H_{83}N_{4}O_{15}P	calyculin	101932-71-2
C_{51}H_{84}O_{22}	protodioscin	55056-80-9
C_{51}H_{85}NO_{18}	eryloside E	157566-49-9
C_{51}H_{86}O_{28}	Mukurozioside IIb	103001-34-9
C_{51}H_{88}O_{28}	Mukurozioside IIa	103001-35-0
C_{51}H_{89}N_{7}O_{13}	surfactin A1	150949-31-8
C_{51}H_{90}O_{2}	Cholesteryl nervonate	60758-73-8
C_{51}H_{91}N_{3}O_{13}	guanidolide A	112539-06-7
C_{51}H_{92}O_{2}	Cholesteryl lignocerate	73024-96-1
C_{51}H_{92}O_{6}	tripalmitelaiden	134907-85-0
C_{51}H_{96}O_{15}	blaberoside IIa	120406-99-7
C_{51}H_{97}N_{3}O_{13}	Oxymipricin	102675-32-1
C_{51}H_{98}O_{6}	tripalmitin	555-44-2
C_{51}H_{100}N_{2}O_{9}	halicylindroside A4	161842-89-3
C_{51}H_{109}Al_{2}O_{11}P_{3}	2DH-335	144913-85-9
C_{52}H_{42}O_{25}	taraninin	163565-70-6
C_{52}H_{50}N_{8}	5,10,15,20-tetrakis(4-dimethylaminophenyl)porphyrin	14945-24-5
C_{52}H_{58}N_{6}	bismethidium spermine	85747-62-2
C_{52}H_{65}N_{11}O_{12}S_{2}	quinomycin A-NX	101975-65-9
C_{52}H_{67}N_{7}O_{10}	PD 145065	153049-49-1
C_{52}H_{69}N_{13}O_{11}	CGP 42112	127060-75-7
C_{52}H_{71}N_{7}O_{12}	microcystin-LF	154037-70-4
C_{52}H_{72}N_{5}LuO_{14}	motexafin lutetium	246252-04-0
C_{52}H_{73}N_{15}O_{12}S	neuromedin B	87096-84-2
C_{52}H_{74}N_{16}O_{15}S_{2}	terlipressin	14636-12-5
C_{52}H_{76}O_{24}	plicamycin	18378-89-7
C_{52}H_{79}N_{5}O_{12}	zotarolimus	221877-54-9
C_{52}H_{81}N_{7}O_{16}	echinocandin B	54651-05-7
C_{52}H_{88}N_{10}O_{15}	caspofungin	179463-17-3
C_{52}H_{98}N_{16}O_{13}	colistin	1264-72-8
C_{52}H_{100}SnO_{4}	Dioctyltin dioleate	27550-52-3
C_{52}H_{101}NO_{15}	longiside	160436-11-3
C_{52}H_{106}	dopentacontane	7719-79-1

== C_{53}–C_{55} ==
C_{53}H_{44}N_{14}O_{13}S_{4}Na_{4}	Direct Brown 106	6854-81-5
C_{53}H_{46}N_{2}P_{2}Br_{2}	NSC 219248	32304-09-9
C_{53}H_{49}N_{2}O_{3}S	NSC 128285	35959-87-6
C_{53}H_{52}O_{22}	venicoside E	208707-91-9
C_{53}H_{55}N_{5}O_{20}	coumermycin A2	3130-60-7
C_{53}H_{56}N_{5}O_{10}P	5-hydroxy-dc CEP	197579-70-7
C_{53}H_{58}O_{17}	thielocin B2	154992-22-0
C_{53}H_{59}O_{30}	violdelphin	126417-59-2
C_{53}H_{62}O_{28}	reiniose G	162478-57-1
C_{53}H_{63}N_{11}O_{19}S_{3}	cionin	126985-56-6
C_{53}H_{64}O_{29}	senegose G	156031-87-7
C_{53}H_{67}N_{9}O_{10}S	quinupristin	120138-50-3
C_{53}H_{68}N_{12}O_{12}S_{2}	quinomycin B	13602-52-3
C_{53}H_{72}N_{2}O_{12}	atracurium besilate	64228-79-1
C_{53}H_{83}NO_{14}	everolimus	159351-69-6
C_{53}H_{84}NO_{14}P	ridaforolimus	572924-54-0
C_{53}H_{85}ClN_{14}O_{17}	syringomycin E	124888-22-8
C_{53}H_{90}O_{23}	Trojanoside E	223924-14-9
C_{53}H_{91}N_{15}O_{15}	polymyxin S1	63700-38-9
C_{53}H_{96}N_{3}O_{13}P	tert-phosphoglucoside	130748-45-7
C_{53}H_{100}O_{6}	dipalmitoyloleoylglycerol	37179-82-1
C_{53}H_{102}O_{6}	trimethylolethane tripalmitate	17356-33-1
C_{54}H_{24}O_{2}	violongthrone	25849-33-6
C_{54}H_{38}O_{37}	mallojaponin	124890-18-2
C_{54}H_{40}P_{2}	(R)-binaphane	544461-38-3
C_{54}H_{42}O_{36}	rhoipteleanin E	166990-07-4
C_{54}H_{45}Cl_{2}P_{3}Ru	dichlorotris(triphenylphosphine)ruthenium(II)	15529-49-4
C_{54}H_{47}IrP_{3}	chlorodihydrotris(triphenylphosphine)iridium	17035-59-5
C_{54}H_{52}O_{19}	foeniculoside III	168010-12-6
C_{54}H_{52}N_{16}O_{15}S_{2}	sulfomycin II	102489-42-9
C_{54}H_{58}O_{29}	sudachiin D	101339-36-0
C_{54}H_{64}O_{29}	reiniose H	162478-58-3
C_{54}H_{68}N_{8}O_{13}	WS 9326A	125774-71-2
C_{54}H_{69}N_{11}O_{10}S_{2}	lanreotide	108736-35-2
C_{54}H_{70}O_{6}N_{4}Mg	chlorophyll d	519-63-1
C_{54}H_{72}N_{8}O_{12}	microcystin-LW	157622-02-1
C_{54}H_{77}N_{13}O_{12}	beta-neoendorphin	77739-21-0
C_{54}H_{80}N_{2}O_{16}S_{2}	laudexium metilsulfate	3253-60-9
C_{54}H_{82}O_{4}	coenzyme Q9	303-97-9
C_{54}H_{90}N_{6}O_{18}	valinomycin	2001-95-8
C_{54}H_{92}O_{24}	siamenoside I	126105-12-2
C_{54}H_{92}O_{46}	maltononaose	6471-60-9
C_{54}H_{95}N_{3}O_{17}	copiamycin	11078-23-2
C_{54}H_{97}N_{9}O_{17}	viscosic acid	26771-81-3
C_{54}H_{105}PO_{3}	trioleyl phosphite	13023-13-7
C_{54}H_{105}PO_{4}	trioleyl phosphate	3305-68-8
C_{54}H_{108}	cyclotetrapentacontane	297-63-2
C_{54}H_{110}	tetrapentacontane	5856-66-6
C_{54}H_{111}PO_{4}	tristearyl phosphate	4889-45-6
C_{55}H_{32}O_{34}	1-alpha-O-Galloylpunicalagin	108906-54-3
C_{55}H_{34}O_{34}	euprostin A	119139-62-7
C_{55}H_{35}Cl_{2}Cu_{2}N_{18}O_{21}S_{5}Na_{5}	kayacion blue E-SE	99548-94-4
C_{55}H_{36}O_{31}	psidinin A	145826-26-2
C_{55}H_{38}O_{30}	malabathrin E	147977-00-2
C_{55}H_{46}O_{37}	coriariin G	147899-42-1
C_{55}H_{50}N_{16}O_{17}S_{2}	thiotipin	158792-26-8
C_{55}H_{59}N_{5}O_{20}	coumerycin A1	4434-05-3
C_{55}H_{62}N_{10}	psychotridine	52617-25-1
C_{55}H_{64}O_{24}	bisbrusatolyl malonate	80096-78-2
C_{55}H_{66}O_{30}	senegose F	156031-86-6
C_{55}H_{70}O_{6}N_{4}Mg	chlorophyll b	519-62-0
C_{55}H_{72}N_{12}O_{12}S	quinomycin C	11001-74-4
C_{55}H_{72}MgN_{4}O_{5}	chlorophyll a	42617-16-3
C_{55}H_{74}IN_{3}O_{21}S_{4}	calicheamicin	108212-75-5
C_{55}H_{74}MgN_{4}O_{6}	bacteriochlorophyll a	17499-98-8
C_{55}H_{79}N_{13}O_{14}S_{2}	neurokinin B	86933-75-7
C_{55}H_{82}O_{21}S_{2}	yessotoxin	112514-54-2
C_{55}H_{83}NO_{21}	avenacin A-1	90547-90-3
C_{55}H_{84}N_{17}O_{21}S_{3}	bleomycin	11056-06-7
C_{55}H_{85}NO_{19}	sitakisoside III	163633-30-5
C_{55}H_{86}O_{24}	aescin	11072-93-8
C_{55}H_{87}NO_{14}	umirolimus	851536-75-9
C_{55}H_{88}O_{22}	saniculoside N	169655-52-9
C_{55}H_{88}O_{23}	taibaienoside III	206559-09-3
C_{55}H_{90}O	ficaprenol-11	26296-50-4
C_{55}H_{90}O_{26}	dongnoside D	125288-52-0
C_{55}H_{91}O_{27}NaS	Reticulatoside B	161996-25-4
C_{55}H_{92}O	bactoprenol	12777-41-2
C_{55}H_{93}N_{3}O_{17}	azalomycin F	11003-24-0
C_{55}H_{94}O_{25}	merremoside F	121043-14-9
C_{55}H_{96}O	glycinoprenol-11	121254-98-6
C_{55}H_{96}O_{18}	oasomycin E	152880-70-1
C_{55}H_{98}O_{6}	berulide	2190-16-1
C_{55}H_{99}NO_{26}	octamycin	71767-97-0
C_{55}H_{103}N_{3}O_{17}	primycin	113441-12-6
C_{55}H_{107}N_{3}O_{21}S	primycin sulfate	30003-49-7
C_{55}H_{112}O_{3}	tristearyl orthoformate	17671-28-2
C_{55}H_{114}NBr	methyltrioctadecylammonium bromide	18262-86-7

== C_{56}–C_{59} ==
C_{56}H_{38}O_{31}	acutissimin A	108906-66-7
C_{56}H_{42}O_{12}	flexuosol A	205440-11-5
C_{56}H_{44}O_{13}	carasinol B	777857-86-0
C_{56}H_{66}O_{24}	fraximalacoside	155179-17-2
C_{56}H_{68}Cl_{4}CuN_{16}S_{4}	alcian blue stain	33864-99-2
C_{56}H_{71}N_{9}SO_{23}	micafungin	235114-32-6
C_{56}H_{78}Cl_{2}N_{2}O_{16}	doxacurium chloride	106819-53-8
C_{56}H_{79}N_{9}O_{13}	aminocandin	227472-48-2
C_{56}H_{80}O_{26}	olivomycin B	6992-69-4
C_{56}H_{83}N_{9}O_{9}S	cyclolinopeptide B	193139-41-2
C_{56}H_{85}N_{17}O_{12}	kallidin	342-10-9
C_{56}H_{87}NO_{16}	temsirolimus	162635-04-3
C_{56}H_{87}NO_{20}	sitakisoside IV	163633-31-6
C_{56}H_{92}O_{29}	digitonin	11024-24-1
C_{56}H_{98}O_{21}	Marubajalapin I	151310-46-2
C_{56}H_{100}N_{16}O_{17}S	polymyxin B	1405-20-5
C_{56}H_{110}O_{4}	didocosyl dodecanedioate	42234-10-6
C_{57}H_{60}O_{12}	crypthophane E	102683-14-7
C_{57}H_{68}O_{23}	castanopsinin Fa	116787-88-3
C_{57}H_{70}O_{32}	tenuifoliose K	147742-16-3
C_{57}H_{72}O_{33}	senegose D	151466-63-6
C_{57}H_{77}N_{9}O_{9}S	cyclolinopeptide D	222527-66-4
C_{57}H_{80}N_{12}O_{24}	trinitrophenylaminolauryl trigliseride	96337-55-2
C_{57}H_{82}O_{26}	chromomycin A3	7059-24-7
C_{57}H_{89}N_{19}O_{21}S_{2}	pingyangmycin	11116-32-8
C_{57}H_{92}O_{6}	trilinolenin	14465-68-0
C_{57}H_{92}O_{26}	indioside A	146029-64-3
C_{57}H_{98}O_{6}	trilinolein	537-40-6
C_{57}H_{104}O_{6}	triolein	122-32-7
C_{57}H_{104}O_{9}	ricinolein	2540-54-7
C_{57}H_{106}TiO_{7}	isopropyl trioleyl titanate	136144-62-2
C_{57}H_{110}O_{6}	tristearin	555-43-1
C_{57}H_{116}	heptapentacontane	5856-67-7
C_{58}H_{66}N_{10}O_{9}	pasireotide	396091-73-9
C_{58}H_{73}N_{7}O_{17}	anidulafungin	166663-25-8
C_{58}H_{73}N_{13}O_{21}S_{2}	ceruletide	17650-98-5
C_{58}H_{80}N_{2}O_{14}	mivacurium chloride	106791-40-6
C_{58}H_{84}N_{2}O_{18}	hachimycin	1394-02-1
C_{58}H_{84}N_{14}O_{16}S	physalemin	2507-24-6
C_{58}H_{84}O_{26}	olivomycin A	6988-58-5
C_{58}H_{88}N_{12}O_{16}	actinomycin F1	1402-44-4
C_{58}H_{95}NO_{29}	esculeoside A	532387-86-3
C_{58}H_{97}N_{15}O_{17}	lycobactin	116340-02-4
C_{58}H_{101}N_{13}O_{20}	herbicolin A	74188-23-1
C_{58}H_{102}O_{21}	Marubajalapin IV	151310-48-4
C_{58}H_{118}	octapentacontane	7667-78-9
C_{59}H_{72}O_{33}	tenuifolioside I	147742-14-1
C_{59}H_{74}O_{34}	tenuifolioside P	147742-21-0
C_{59}H_{76}O_{35}	Jasamplexoside B	147742-01-6
C_{59}H_{79}N_{15}O_{21}S_{6}	linaclotide	851199-59-2
C_{59}H_{80}N_{4}O_{22}S_{4}	esperamicin	99674-26-7
C_{59}H_{81}N_{11}O_{13}	stelladelin A	172617-98-0
C_{59}H_{82}CoN_{16}O_{15}P	Cyanohypoxanthinylcobamide	23297-71-4
C_{59}H_{84}N_{2}O_{18}	candicidin	1403-17-4
C_{59}H_{84}N_{16}O_{12}	leuprorelin	53714-56-0
C_{59}H_{84}N_{18}O_{14}	goserelin	65807-02-5
C_{59}H_{88}N_{2}O_{17}	perimycin	62327-61-1
C_{59}H_{89}N_{19}O_{13}S	icatibant	130308-48-4
C_{59}H_{90}O_{4}	coenzyme Q10	303-98-0
C_{59}H_{92}O_{4}	ubiquinol	992-78-9
C_{59}H_{95}N_{15}O_{18}S	kassinin	63968-82-1
C_{59}H_{97}N_{2}ClO_{4}	dioctadecyl tetramethylindocarboncyanine perchlorate	41085-99-8
C_{59}H_{100}N_{12}O_{16}	puwainaphycin B	142998-31-0
C_{59}H_{102}O_{25}	quamoclin III	147103-16-0
C_{59}H_{109}N_{6}O_{19}P	mifamurtide	83461-56-7
C_{59}H_{120}	nonapentacontane	7667-79-0

== C_{60}–C_{62} ==
C_{60}	buckminsterfullerene	99685-96-8
C_{60}H_{59}PO_{4}	bis(2,4,6-tris(1-phenylethyl)phenoxy)phosphinic acid	93777-22-1
C_{60}H_{62}O_{24}	foeniculoside IV	168010-13-7
C_{60}H_{66}S_{6}	Hexakis(4-methylbenzylsulfanylmethyl)benzene	69998-68-1
C_{60}H_{74}O_{34}	reiniose J	162523-99-1
C_{60}H_{76}N_{12}O_{16}	sandramycin	100940-65-6
C_{60}H_{78}OSn_{2}	fenbutatin oxide	13356-08-6
C_{60}H_{82}N_{2}O_{22}	Ditrisarubicin A	87399-21-1
C_{60}H_{86}O_{19}	ciguatoxin CTX1B	11050-21-8
C_{60}H_{86}O_{19}	halichondrin B	103614-76-2
C_{60}H_{86}N_{12}O_{16}	actinomycin F3	1402-46-6
C_{60}H_{88}N_{2}O_{19}	mepartricin	62534-88-3
C_{60}H_{89}N_{15}O_{13}	alpha-neoendorphin	69671-17-6
C_{60}H_{90}N_{6}O_{14}	emodepside	155030-63-0
C_{60}H_{90}N_{12}O_{16}	actinomycin F2	1402-45-5
C_{60}H_{91}N_{5}O_{13}	sanglifehrin A	62-74-8
C_{60}H_{92}N_{12}O_{10}	gramicidin S	113-73-5
C_{60}H_{94}O_{28}	trichoside C	35610-16-3
C_{60}H_{95}NO_{23}	mussaendoside Q	161407-77-8
C_{60}H_{96}O_{29}	scillascilloside E3	97400-14-1
C_{60}H_{97}NO_{7}	Pantothenyl tri(farnesylacetate)	15470-06-1
C_{60}H_{98}O_{28}	bersimoside I	130444-08-5
C_{60}H_{106}O_{22}	Marubajalapin VI	151336-03-7
C_{60}H_{116}O_{7}	triisostearyl citrate	113431-54-2
C_{60}H_{122}	hexacontane	7667-80-3
C_{60}O	fullerene epoxide	135105-53-2
C_{61}H_{76}O_{35}	reiniose I	162523-98-0
C_{61}H_{84}N_{16}O_{13}S	ranatensin	29451-71-6
C_{61}H_{88}Cl_{2}O_{32}	avilamycin A	69787-79-7
C_{61}H_{90}Cl_{2}O_{32}	avilamycin C	69787-80-0
C_{61}H_{92}N_{12}O_{16}	actinomycin F4	1402-47-7
C_{61}H_{94}N_{18}O_{16}	allatostatin I	123209-95-0
C_{61}H_{100}O_{23}	periplocoside J	119902-15-7
C_{61}H_{101}N_{17}O_{25}S_{4}	uroguanylin	152175-68-3
C_{61}H_{102}N_{10}O_{13}	mycoplanecin A	72993-51-2
C_{61}H_{106}O_{25}	stoloniferin V	156886-10-8
C_{61}H_{107}N_{3}O_{20}	Malolactomycin D	189759-06-6
C_{62}H_{64}O_{37}	rhodisinoside	125579-38-6
C_{62}H_{66}O_{20}	thielocin B3	143716-44-3
C_{62}H_{76}N_{14}O_{23}	luzopeptin B	76149-24-1
C_{62}H_{82}N_{12}O_{16}	actinomycin	50-76-0
C_{62}H_{88}O_{21}	bouceroside B2	120180-91-8
C_{62}H_{89}CoN_{13}O_{15}P	hydroxocobalamin	13422-51-0
C_{62}H_{90}N_{16}O_{15}	buserelin	57982-77-1
C_{62}H_{94}O_{24}	cynafoside D	117479-85-3
C_{62}H_{95}NO_{24}	sitakisoside VI	164177-53-1
C_{62}H_{96}O_{31}	Herniariasaponin 3	155179-16-1
C_{62}H_{98}O_{31}	muscaroside E	111321-25-6
C_{62}H_{100}O_{33}	diuranthoside C	132998-88-0
C_{62}H_{111}N_{11}O_{12}	ciclosporin	59865-13-3
C_{62}H_{126}	dohexacontane	7719-83-7

== C_{63}–C_{66} ==
C_{63}H_{78}N_{16}O_{22}	korkormicin D	165905-17-9
C_{63}H_{88}CoN_{14}O_{14}P	cyanocobalamin	68-19-9
C_{63}H_{104}O_{23}	periplocoside F	119902-17-9
C_{63}H_{105}EuO_{6}	Tris(d,d-dicampholylmethanato) europium(III)	52351-64-1
C_{63}H_{106}O_{35}	sativoside B1	126594-42-1
C_{63}H_{108}N_{22}O_{19}	secretolytin	163365-08-0
C_{63}H_{110}O_{12}	Glyceryl triacetoricinoleate	101-34-8
C_{63}H_{110}O_{25}	quamoclin IV	147103-17-1
C_{63}H_{111}N_{3}O_{20}	malolactomycin A	135667-47-9
C_{63}H_{114}O_{6}	triisostearyltrimellitate	93858-71-0
C_{63}H_{122}O_{6}	triaachidin	620-64-4
C_{63}H_{123}NO_{6}	nitrilotripropylene tristearate	85711-99-5
C_{64}H_{78}N_{10}O_{10}	antamanide	75580-37-9
C_{64}H_{80}N_{16}O_{22}	korkormicin F	165905-19-1
C_{64}H_{82}N_{18}O_{13}	triptorelin	57773-63-4
C_{64}H_{83}N_{17}O_{12}	deslorelin	57773-65-6
C_{64}H_{96}N_{12}O_{16}	actinomycin F0	1402-43-3
C_{64}H_{98}O_{4}	coenzyme Q11	24663-35-2
C_{64}H_{101}NO_{16}	linearmycin A	163596-98-3
C_{64}H_{112}O_{22}	Marubajalapin X	148077-35-4
C_{64}H_{130}	tetrahexacontane	7719-87-1
C_{65}H_{82}N_{16}O_{22}	korkormicin E	165905-18-0
C_{65}H_{84}N_{11}O_{13}	tyrothricin	1404-88-2
C_{65}H_{85}N_{13}O_{30}	mycobacillin	18524-67-9
C_{65}H_{90}N_{14}O_{19}S_{2}	DOTA-TATE	177984-89-4
C_{65}H_{92}N_{14}O_{18}S_{2}	edotreotide	204318-14-9
C_{65}H_{102}O_{31}	lobatoside E	123714-91-0
C_{65}H_{112}N_{24}O_{18}	kemptamide	89315-28-6
C_{65}H_{118}N_{22}O_{20}	autocamtide II	129198-88-5
C_{66}H_{75}Cl_{2}N_{9}O_{24}	vancomycin	1404-90-6
C_{66}H_{83}N_{17}O_{13}	nafarelin	78932-56-4
C_{66}H_{84}N_{16}O_{22}	korkormicin A	165905-14-6
C_{66}H_{86}N_{18}O_{12}	histrelin	76712-82-8
C_{66}H_{87}N_{13}O_{13}	tyrocidine	8011-61-8
C_{66}H_{94}N_{12}O_{16}	actinomycin E2	1402-42-2
C_{66}H_{96}O_{2}	menaquinone-11	19228-10-5
C_{66}H_{103}NO_{16}	linearmycin B	182291-65-2
C_{66}H_{103}N_{17}SO_{16}	bacitracin	1405-87-4
C_{66}H_{112}O_{34}	neomogroside	189307-15-1
C_{66}H_{134}	hexahexacontane	7719-89-3

== C_{67}–C_{69} ==
C_{67}H_{86}N_{16}O_{22}	korkormicin B	165905-15-7
C_{67}H_{92}N_{18}O_{23}	orcokinin	145344-97-4
C_{67}H_{96}N_{2}O_{24}	tetrocarcin A	73666-84-9
C_{67}H_{100}N_{2}O_{24}	kijanimicin	78798-08-0
C_{67}H_{136}	heptahexacontane	7719-90-6
C_{68}H_{79}NO_{11}	cofisatin	54063-34-2
C_{68}H_{84}N_{16}O_{22}	quinoxapeptin A	175484-07-8
C_{68}H_{88}N_{16}O_{22}	korkormicin C	165905-16-8
C_{68}H_{108}O_{26}	periplocoside K	119902-16-8
C_{68}H_{110}N_{22}O_{27}S_{2}	tallysomycin A	65057-90-1
C_{69}H_{83}Cl_{2}N_{9}O_{11}S	doleron	63482-28-0
C_{69}H_{103}N_{19}O_{14}	granuliberin r	64704-41-2
C_{69}H_{106}O_{4}	coenzyme Q12	24663-36-3

== C_{70}–C_{79} ==
C_{70}H_{84}O_{6}	violanthrone-78	82145-74-2
C_{70}H_{92}ClN_{17}O_{14}	cetrorelix	120287-85-6
C_{70}H_{110}O_{36}	Lobatoside J	143519-42-0
C_{70}H_{142}	heptacontane	7719-93-9
C_{71}H_{69}Cl_{3}N_{8}O_{25}	chloropolysporin pseudoglycone	111203-27-1
C_{71}H_{94}N_{20}O_{17}S_{2}	HS-014	207678-81-7
C_{71}H_{104}O_{2}	menaquinone-12	27670-93-5
C_{71}H_{110}N_{24}O_{18}S	bombesin	31362-50-2
C_{72}H_{60}P_{4}Pd	tetrakis(triphenylphosphine)palladium(0)	14221-01-3
C_{72}H_{60}P_{4}Ni	tetrakis(triphenylphosphine)nickel(0)	15133-82-1
C_{72}H_{85}N_{19}O_{18}S_{5}	thiostrepton	1393-48-2
C_{72}H_{86}ClN_{9}O_{28}	decaplanin	128441-18-9
C_{72}H_{95}ClN_{14}O_{14}	abarelix	183552-38-7
C_{72}H_{100}CoN_{18}O_{17}P	cobamamide	13870-90-1
C_{72}H_{101}N_{17}O_{26}	daptomycin	103060-53-3
C_{72}H_{104}Na_{8}O_{48}S_{8}	sugammadex	343306-79-6
C_{72}H_{144}	cyclodoheptacontane	63217-76-5
C_{72}H_{148}TiO_{4}	tetraoctadecyl orthotitanate	5128-29-0
C_{73}H_{89}ClN_{10}O_{26}	eremomycin	110865-90-2
C_{73}H_{108}O_{12}	antioxidant 1010	6683-19-8
C_{73}H_{134}O_{17}	blaberoside Ib	120406-98-6
C_{74}H_{100}ClN_{5}O_{14}	antarelix	151272-78-5
C_{74}H_{100}ClN_{15}O_{14}	teverelix	144743-92-0
C_{74}H_{108}O_{42}	dodecyl laminarapentaoside peracetate	158041-98-6
C_{74}H_{114}O_{4}	coenzyme Q13	75743-46-1
C_{74}H_{130}N_{18}O_{14}	crabolin	93207-22-8
C_{75}H_{125}N_{3}O_{52}	trestatin C	71892-68-7
C_{75}H_{126}N_{24}O_{15}	dynorphin A	72957-38-1
C_{76}H_{52}O_{46}	tannic acid	1401-55-4
C_{76}H_{104}N_{18}O_{19}S_{2}	somatostatin	51110-01-1
C_{76}H_{112}O_{2}	menaquinone-13	27123-26-0
C_{77}H_{99}ClN_{16}O_{13}	RS-15378	123219-97-6
C_{77}H_{109}N_{21}O_{19}S	alpha-MSH	581-05-5
C_{77}H_{120}N_{18}O_{26}S	alpha-endorphin	61512-76-3
C_{77}H_{136}N_{4}O_{22}S_{2}	Theonezolide B	157536-46-4
C_{78}H_{105}ClN_{18}O_{13}	detirelix	89662-30-6
C_{78}H_{111}N_{21}O_{19}	afamelanotide	75921-69-6
C_{78}H_{121}N_{21}O_{20}	neurotensin	39379-15-2
C_{79}H_{129}N27O22	nociceptin	170713-75-4
C_{79}H_{131}N_{31}O_{24}S_{4}	apamin	24345-16-2
C_{79}H_{140}N_{4}O_{22}S_{2}	Theonezolide A	150243-49-5

== C_{80}–C_{89} ==
C_{80}H_{106}Cl_{2}N_{11}O_{27}P	telavancin	372151-71-8
C_{80}H_{113}ClN_{18}O_{13}	ganirelix	129311-55-3
C_{81}H_{120}O_{2}	menaquinone-14	106347-62-0
C_{81}H_{131}N_{19}O_{27}S	gamma-endorphin	60893-02-9
C_{82}H_{50}O_{50}	roburin A	132864-75-6
C_{82}H_{54}O_{52}	sanguiin H-6	82978-00-5
C_{82}H_{108}ClN_{17}O_{14}	iturelix	112568-12-4
C_{82}H_{166}	dooctacontane	7719-95-1
C_{83}H_{135}N_{29}O_{30}S_{2}	atriopeptin I	89139-53-7
C_{83}H_{150}O_{33}	cycloviracin B1	142382-45-4
C_{84}H_{107}ClN_{18}O_{18}	degarelix	214766-78-6
C_{84}H_{140}O_{39}	crocosmioside B	113900-78-0
C_{85}H_{112}O_{37}	angelmicin B	151687-86-4
C_{85}H_{142}O_{39}	crocosmioside H	124853-83-4
C_{86}H_{97}Cl_{3}N_{10}O_{26}	oritavancin	171099-57-3
C_{86}H_{109}N_{21}O_{26}S_{2}	vintafolide	742092-03-1
C_{86}H_{128}O_{2}	menaquinone-15	106347-61-9
C_{86}H_{144}O_{40}	crocosmioside I	124631-52-3
C_{86}H_{172}O_{6}	caldarchaeol	99259-31-4
C_{87}H_{138}O_{49}	vaccegoside C	53123-90-3
C_{87}H_{170}O_{6}	glycerintrimontanate	31661-27-5
C_{88}H_{100}Cl_{2}N_{10}O_{28}	dalbavancin	171500-79-1
C_{88}H_{118}O_{59}	maltoheptaosetricosaacetate	114715-54-7
C_{89}H_{102}ClN_{9}O_{36}	avoparcin	37332-99-3
C_{89}H_{180}	nonaoctacontane	7719-76-8

== C_{90}–C_{100} ==
C_{90}H_{150}O_{44}	crocosmioside D	113866-81-2
C_{91}H_{152}O_{44}	crocosmioside F	124631-50-1
C_{92}H_{145}N_{25}O_{26}	dirucotide	152074-92-0
C_{92}H_{150}N_{22}O_{25}	alamethicin	27061-78-5
C_{94}H_{190}	tetranonacontane	1574-32-9
C_{95}H_{150}O_{46}	julibroside J7	221313-74-2
C_{96}H_{158}O_{48}	crocosmioside G	124631-51-2
C_{96}H_{192}	cyclohexanonacontane	63217-79-8
C_{97}H_{124}N_{20}O_{31}S	little gastrin I	10047-33-3
C_{98}H_{136}N_{26}O_{29}S	beta-melanotropin	19941-13-0
C_{98}H_{138}N_{24}O_{33}	bivalirudin	128270-60-0
C_{98}H_{156}N_{34}O_{32}S_{2}	atriopeptin II	89139-58-4
C_{99}H_{154}N_{24}O_{24}S	cypemycin	154277-21-1
C_{99}H_{155}N_{29}O_{21}S	alsactide	34765-96-3
C_{100}H_{156}N_{34}O_{22}S	giractide	24870-04-0
C_{100}H_{164}O	dolichol	2067-66-5
C_{100}H_{202}	hectane	6703-98-6

== C_{>100} ==
Chemical formula	Synonyms	CAS Number
C_{101}H_{158}N_{30}O_{23}S	codactide	22572-04-9
C_{102}H_{172}N_{36}O_{32}S_{7}	ziconotide	107452-89-1
C_{103}H_{115}N_{23}O_{23}	RES 701-1	151308-34-8
C_{103}H_{147}N_{27}O_{37}S_{5}	sarafotoxin S6C	121695-87-2
C_{104}H_{150}N_{24}O_{27}	cydiastatin 2	134760-78-4
C_{106}H_{170}ClN_{21}O_{30}	ramoplanin	76168-82-6
C_{107}H_{165}N_{35}O_{34}S_{2}	atriopeptin III	90817-13-3
C_{108}H_{172}O_{53}	julibroside I	163498-48-4
C_{108}H_{180}P_{2}O_{7}	NSC 137054	29068-85-7
C_{112}H_{165}N_{27}O_{36}	corticotropin-like intermediate peptide	53917-42-3
C_{113}H_{177}N_{39}O_{35}S_{2}	atriopeptin IV	90052-57-6
C_{116}H_{76}O_{74}	lambertianin B	212137-60-5
C_{123}H_{80}O_{78}	lambertianin C	153059-16-6
C_{123}H_{212}N_{44}O_{35}S	orexin B	205640-91-1
C_{128}H_{122}O_{65}	Proanthocyanidin T4	213126-98-8
C_{129}H_{192}N_{36}O_{29}	pleurocidin	190324-47-1
C_{129}H_{223}N_{3}O_{54}	palytoxin	77734-91-9
C_{130}H_{250}O_{15}	trehalose dimycolate	61512-20-7
C_{131}H_{200}N_{20}O_{43}S_{2}	amidorphin	94885-44-6
C_{131}H_{204}N_{40}O_{29}S	tricosactide	20282-58-0
C_{131}H_{229}N_{39}O_{31}	melittin	20449-79-0
C_{136}H_{210}N_{40}O_{31}S	tetracosactide	16960-16-0
C_{142}H_{222}N_{42}O_{31}	norleusactide	17692-62-5
C_{142}H_{243}N_{45}O_{39}S_{7}	scyllatoxin	142948-19-4
C_{143}H_{230}N_{42}O_{37}S_{7}	nisin	1414-45-5
C_{143}H_{244}N_{50}O_{42}S_{4}	nesiritide	124584-08-3
C_{145}H_{234}N_{52}O_{44}S_{3}	urodilatin	115966-23-9
C_{145}H_{240}N_{44}O_{48}S_{2}	calcitonin	9007-12-9
C_{146}H_{213}N_{43}O_{40}	galanin	88813-36-9
C_{147}H_{253}N_{45}O_{43}	Cecropin P1	125667-96-1
C_{148}H_{260}N_{58}O_{45}S_{6}	imperatoxin	172451-37-5
C_{149}H_{246}N_{44}O_{42}S	sermorelin	86168-78-7
C_{149}H_{249}N_{47}O_{42}	ghrelin	258279-04-8
C_{150}H_{230}N_{44}O_{39}S	tosactide	47931-80-6
C_{152}N_{243}N_{47}O_{44}S_{4}	orexin A	205640-90-0
C_{153}H_{225}N_{43}O_{49}S	glucagon	16941-32-5
C_{156}H_{242}N_{48}O_{49}S_{7}	stromatoxin	
C_{156}H_{245}N_{51}O_{44}S_{6}	cobatoxin	211688-17-4
C_{158}H_{249}N_{53}O_{47}S_{11}	chlorotoxin	163515-35-3
C_{158}H_{251}N_{39}O_{46}S	beta-endorphin	61214-51-5
C_{161}H_{236}N_{42}O_{48}	leumorphin	93443-35-7
C_{164}H_{106}O_{104}	lambertianin D	
C_{164}H_{268}O_{68}S_{2}Na_{2}	maitotoxin	59392-53-9
C_{169}H_{274}N_{54}O_{48}S_{7}	stichodactyla toxin	172450-46-3
C_{170}H_{245}N_{47}O_{54}S_{6}	heteroscodratoxin-1	
C_{171}H_{283}N_{55}O_{49}S_{8}	kaliotoxin	145199-73-1
C_{176}H_{277}N_{57}O_{55}S_{7}	charybdotoxin	95751-30-7
C_{177}H_{268}N_{52}O_{50}S_{6}	grammotoxin	
C_{177}H_{281}N_{47}O_{50}S_{7}	slotoxin	144026-79-9
C_{178}H_{286}N_{52}O_{50}S_{7}	margatoxin	145808-47-5
C_{179}H_{274}N_{50}O_{55}S_{7}	iberiotoxin	129203-60-7
C_{181}H_{264}N_{48}O_{51}S_{6}	hanatoxin-1	170780-00-4
C_{181}H_{291}N_{55}O_{51}S_{2}	teriparatide	52232-67-4
C_{190}H_{287}N_{55}O_{57}	neuropeptide Y	82785-45-3
C_{200}H_{312}N_{62}O_{57}S_{6}	psalmotoxin	
C_{202}H_{298}N_{50}O_{64}	enfuvirtide	159519-65-0
C_{205}H_{339}N_{59}O_{63}S	corticorelin	79804-71-0
C_{207}H_{308}N_{56}O_{58}S	seractide	12279-41-3
C_{208}H_{358}N_{62}O_{51}	moricin	172450-54-3
C_{215}H_{358}N_{72}O_{66}S	somatorelin	83930-13-6
C_{257}H_{383}N_{65}O_{77}S_{6}	insulin	9004-10-8
C_{267}H_{404}N_{72}O_{78}S_{6}	insulin glargine	160337-95-1
C_{284}H_{432}N_{84}O_{79}S_{7}	aprotinin	9087-70-1
C_{288}H_{448}N_{80}O_{110}S_{6}	lepirudin	120993-53-5
C_{299}H_{476}N_{90}O_{87}S_{10}	calciseptine	134710-25-1
C_{305}H_{442}N_{88}O_{91}S_{8}	ecallantide	460738-38-9
C_{321}H_{476}N_{86}O_{78}S_{6}	calcicludine	178031-96-2
C_{324}H_{478}N_{94}O_{90}S_{8}	kurtoxin	
C_{331}H_{512}N_{94}O_{101}S_{7}	mecasermin	68562-41-4
C_{338}H_{529}N_{97}O_{105}S_{11}	alpha-bungarotoxin	11032-79-4
C_{975}H_{1513}N_{267}O_{304}S_{26}	urofollitropin	146479-72-3
C_{990}H_{1532}N_{262}O_{300}S_{7}	pegvisomant	218620-50-9
C_{995}H_{1537}N_{263}O_{301}S_{8}	somatrem	82030-87-3
C_{3232}H_{5032}N_{864}O_{979}S_{41}	albiglutide	782500-75-8
C_{6548}H_{10122}N_{1730}O_{2034}S_{44}	tefibazumab	521079-87-8
C_{6760}H_{10447}N_{1743}O_{2010}S_{32}	botulinum toxin	93384-43-1
C_{169719}H_{270466}N_{45688}O_{52238}S_{911}	titin	

== See also ==
- Carbon number
