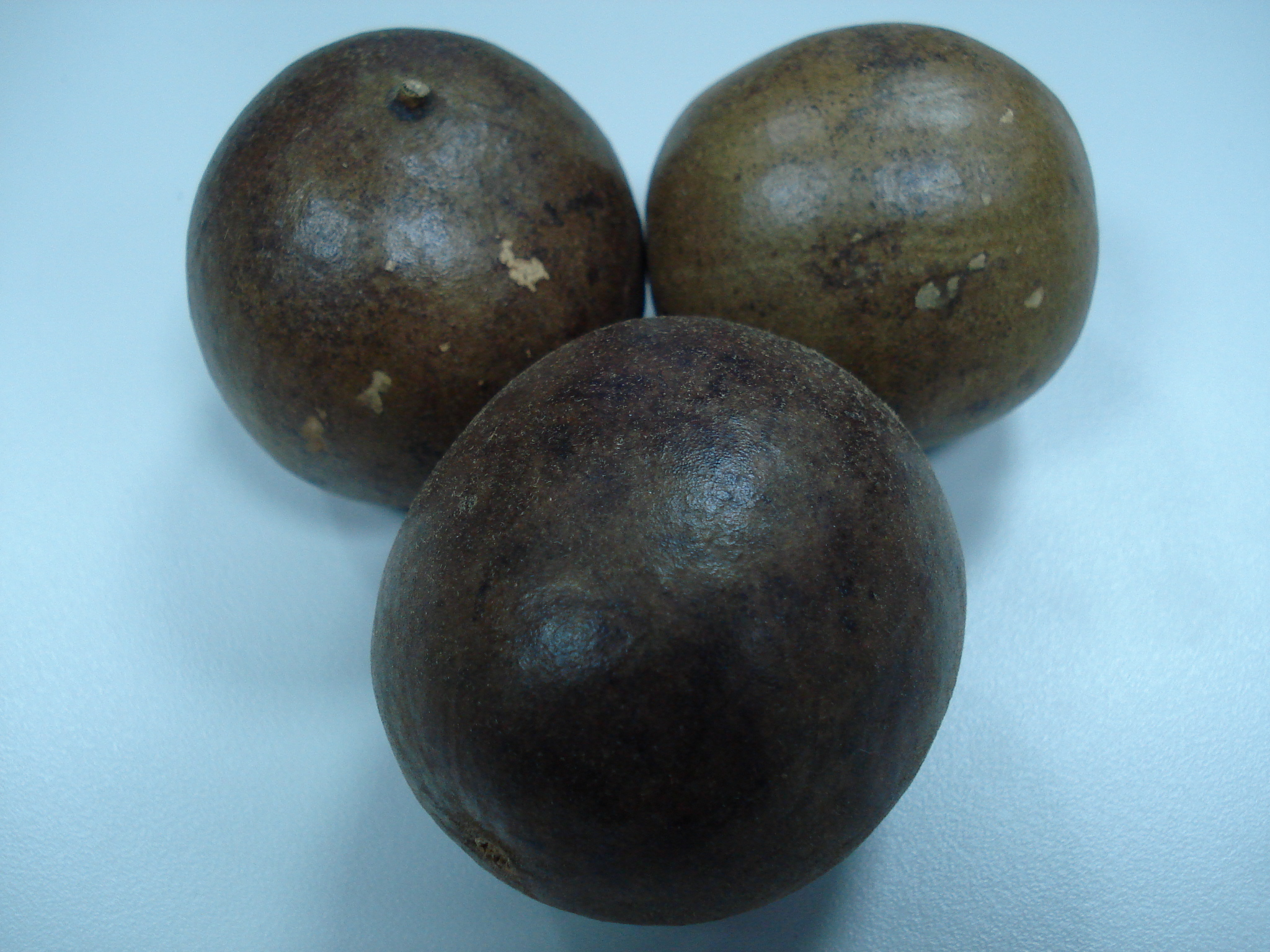
- Siraitia grosvenorii (luo han) fruits

Scientific classification
- Kingdom: Plantae
- Clade: Tracheophytes
- Clade: Angiosperms
- Clade: Eudicots
- Clade: Rosids
- Order: Cucurbitales
- Family: Cucurbitaceae
- Genus: Siraitia
- Species: S. grosvenorii

Binomial name
- Siraitia grosvenorii (Swingle) C. Jeffrey ex A.M. Lu & Zhi Y. Zhang

Synonyms
- Momordica grosvenorii Swingle; Thladiantha grosvenorii (Swingle) C.Jeffrey

= Siraitia grosvenorii =

Species of plant with a sweet gourd fruit extract

Siraitia grosvenorii (monkfruit)
- Traditional Chinese: 羅漢果
- Simplified Chinese: 罗汉果
- Literal meaning: arhat fruit
Transcriptions
Standard Mandarin
- Hanyu Pinyin: luóhàn guǒ
- IPA: [lwǒxân kwò]
Yue: Cantonese
- Yale Romanization: lóh-hon gwó
- Jyutping: lo^{4}-hon^{3} gwo^{2}
- IPA: [lɔ˩hɔn˧ kʷɔ˧˥]

Siraitia grosvenorii, commonly known as luohan fruit (Chinese: 羅漢果; pinyin: luóhàn guǒ "arhat fruit", also directly: luo han guo/kuo), monk fruit or swingle fruit is a herbaceous perennial vine of the gourd family, Cucurbitaceae, native to southern China.

The plant is cultivated for its fruit extract containing mogrosides. Mogroside extract has been used as a low-calorie sugar substitute for drinks and in traditional Chinese medicine. One mogroside classified as mogroside V produces a sweet-tasting sensation 250 times stronger than sucrose.

== Etymology and regional names ==
In Buddhism, an arhat is a monk who has attained enlightenment, also described as one who has attained the "fruition of arhatship" (Sanskrit: arhattaphala); this thus was partially calqued as 羅漢果 luóhàn guǒ (plus rendered into Vietnamese as la hán quả), the Chinese name was adopted as the Western commercial designation for this fruit.

The genus name Siraitia was named by American botanist Elmer Drew Merrill for his colleague Sirait Sawek, a Thai botanist who collected specimens in Southeast Asia.

The species name grosvenorii honors Gilbert Hovey Grosvenor, who, as president of the National Geographic Society, helped to fund an expedition in the 1930s to find the living plant in China where it was already being cultivated.

== History and distribution ==
Monk fruit was first mentioned in the 13th century off Chinese monastic records in Guangxi in the region of Guilin. The difficulty of cultivation meant the fruit did not become part of the Chinese herbal tradition which depended on more readily available products.

The first English botanical description of monk fruit was published in 1941 by Walter T. Swingle. The first publication identifying the sweet compound in monk fruit as a novel glycoside was authored by C. H. Lee in 1975. In 1983, T. Takemoto et al. published independent research into the sweet compounds in monk fruit, naming the primary component "mogroside V" and related novel components "mogroside IV" and "mogroside VI".

The development of luohan fruit products in China has continued ever since, focusing in particular on the development of concentrated extracts.

== Description ==
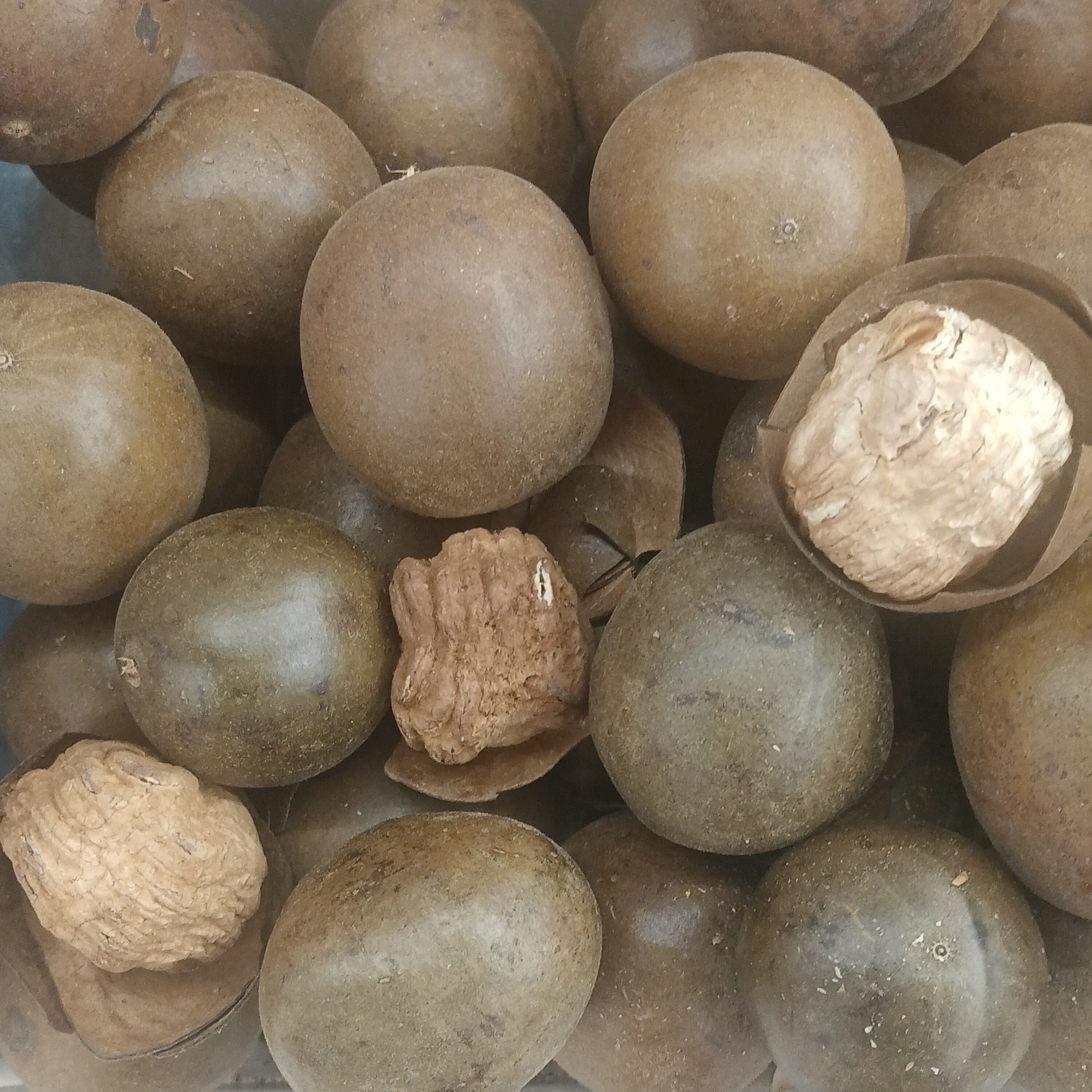
Dried monkfruit

The vine attains a length of 3 to 5 m (9.8 to 16 ft), climbing over other plants by means of tendrils which twine around anything they touch. The narrow, heart-shaped leaves are 10–20 cm (4–8 in) long. The fruit is round or oblong, 4–8 cm (1.6–3.1 in) in diameter, smooth and yellow-brown in color. The inside of the fruit contains an edible pulp. When dried, it forms a thin, light brown, brittle shell about 1 mm in thickness. The seeds are pale yellow and broadly ovate.

The interior fruit is eaten fresh, and the rind is used to make tea.

The monkfruit is notable for its sweetness, which can be concentrated from its juice. The fruit contains 25–38% of various carbohydrates, mainly fructose and glucose. The sweetness of the fruit is increased by the mogrosides, a group of triterpene glycosides (saponins). The five different mogrosides are numbered from I to V; the main component is mogroside V, which is also known as esgoside.

== Mogroside biosynthesis ==
One analysis of 200 candidate genes of Siraitia grosvenorii revealed five enzyme families involved in the synthesis of mogroside V: squalene epoxidases, triterpenoid synthases, epoxide hydrolases, cytochrome P450s, and UDP-glucosyltransferases. The metabolic pathway for mogroside biosynthesis involves an initial stage of fruit development when squalene is metabolized to di-glucosylated, tetra-hydroxycucurbitadienols, then during fruit maturation, branched glucosyl groups are added and catalyzed, leading to the sweet M4, M5, and M6 mogrosides.

== Cultivation ==
Germination of seeds is slow and may take several months. It is grown primarily in the far southern Chinese province of Guangxi (mostly in the mountains near Guilin), as well as in Guangdong, Guizhou, Hunan, and Jiangxi. These mountains lend the plants shade and often are surrounded by mists which protect the plants from the sun. Nonetheless, the climate in this southern province is warm. The plant is rarely found in the wild, and has been cultivated for hundreds of years.

Records as early as 1813 mention the cultivation of this plant in the Guangxi province. Most of the plantations are located in Yongfu County and Lingui County.

== Traditional processing ==
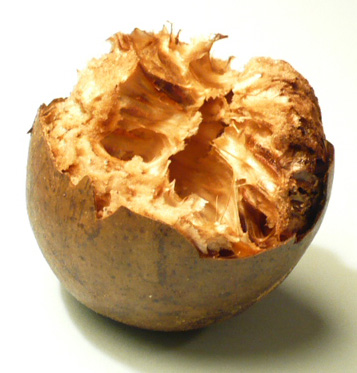
Dried Siraitia grosvenorii fruit cut open, with the seeds removed

Harvested luohan fruit are green, which is kept to dry until it browns for a longer shelf life; the brown dried fruit is the usual sold in Chinese herbal shops. The fruits can be dried slowly in ovens, preserving them and removing most of the unwanted aromas. However, this technique also leads to formation of several bitter and astringent flavors, limiting its use and extracts to the preparation of diluted tea, soup, and as a sweetener for products that would usually have sugar or honey added to them.

== Commercial manufacturing ==
The process for the manufacture of a useful sweetener from luo han guo was patented in 1995 by Procter & Gamble. The patent states that luo han fruit has many interfering flavors caused by sulfurous volatile substances such as hydrogen disulfide, methional, methionol, dimethylsulfide, and methylmercaptan, which are formed from amino acids that contain sulfur, such as methionine, S-methylmethionine, cystine, and cysteine; those which render it useless for general applications. This patent describes a process to remove them.

== Sweetening agent ==
The sweet taste of the fruit comes mainly from mogrosides, a group of triterpene glycosides that make up about 1% of the flesh of the fresh fruit. Through solvent extraction, a powder containing 80% mogrosides can be obtained, the main one being mogroside-5 (esgoside). Other similar agents in the fruit are siamenoside and neomogroside.

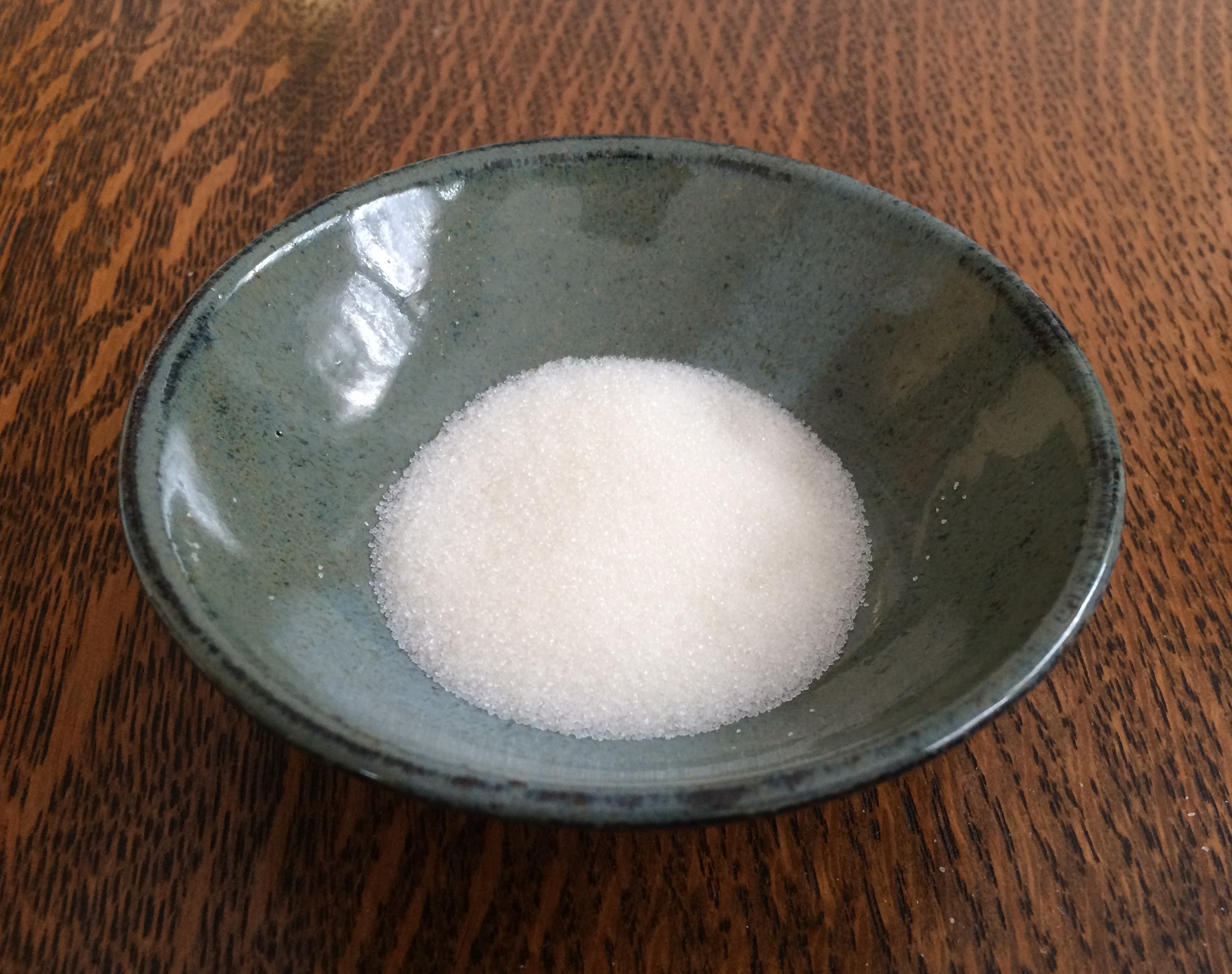
Dish of monkfruit sweetener

In this process, the peel and seeds are removed, and the pulped fruit is made into a concentrate or puree. Additional juice may be extracted from the remaining pulp with hot water. The juice is homogenized, acidified slightly to prevent gelling and improve the flavor, then treated with pectinase or other enzymes to break down the pectin. Most of the off-flavor agents are then removed with ion-exchange resins, such as sulfonated polystyrene-divinylbenzene copolymer or polyacrylic acid. Alternatively, the off-flavors can be adsorbed by agents like charcoal or bentonite, which are removed by filtration; or precipitated with gelatin or other gelling agents. Most of the remaining sulfurous volatiles are then removed by low-pressure evaporation. The juice is then pasteurized to inactivate remaining natural enzymes and kill microorganisms.

The process is said to preserve a substantial fraction of the mogrosides present in the fruit, with the resulting sweetness at a level about 250 times stronger than sucrose.

=== Safety ===
At least one generally recognized as safe (GRAS) notice has been received by the U.S. Food and Drug Administration. The FDA granted GRAS certification to Siraitia grosvenorii extracts and processed products in 2011.

In Europe, it is classified as an unapproved novel food (not used in the food system before May 1997) which means that it may be marketed as a food or food ingredient only after a safety assessment and approval by the European Commission. In 2019, the EFSA Panel on Food Additives and Flavourings (FAF) was asked by the European Commission to provide its scientific opinion on the safety of monkfruit extract as a food additive. The panel concluded that the current body of research was insufficient. As of 2023, Siraitia grosvenorii was not listed among approved Novel Foods in the EU.

=== Traditional uses ===
The plant is most prized for use of its sweet fruit as a sweetener. In traditional Chinese medicine, it is used for cough and sore throat. The fruits are generally sold in dried form, and used in herbal tea or soup.
