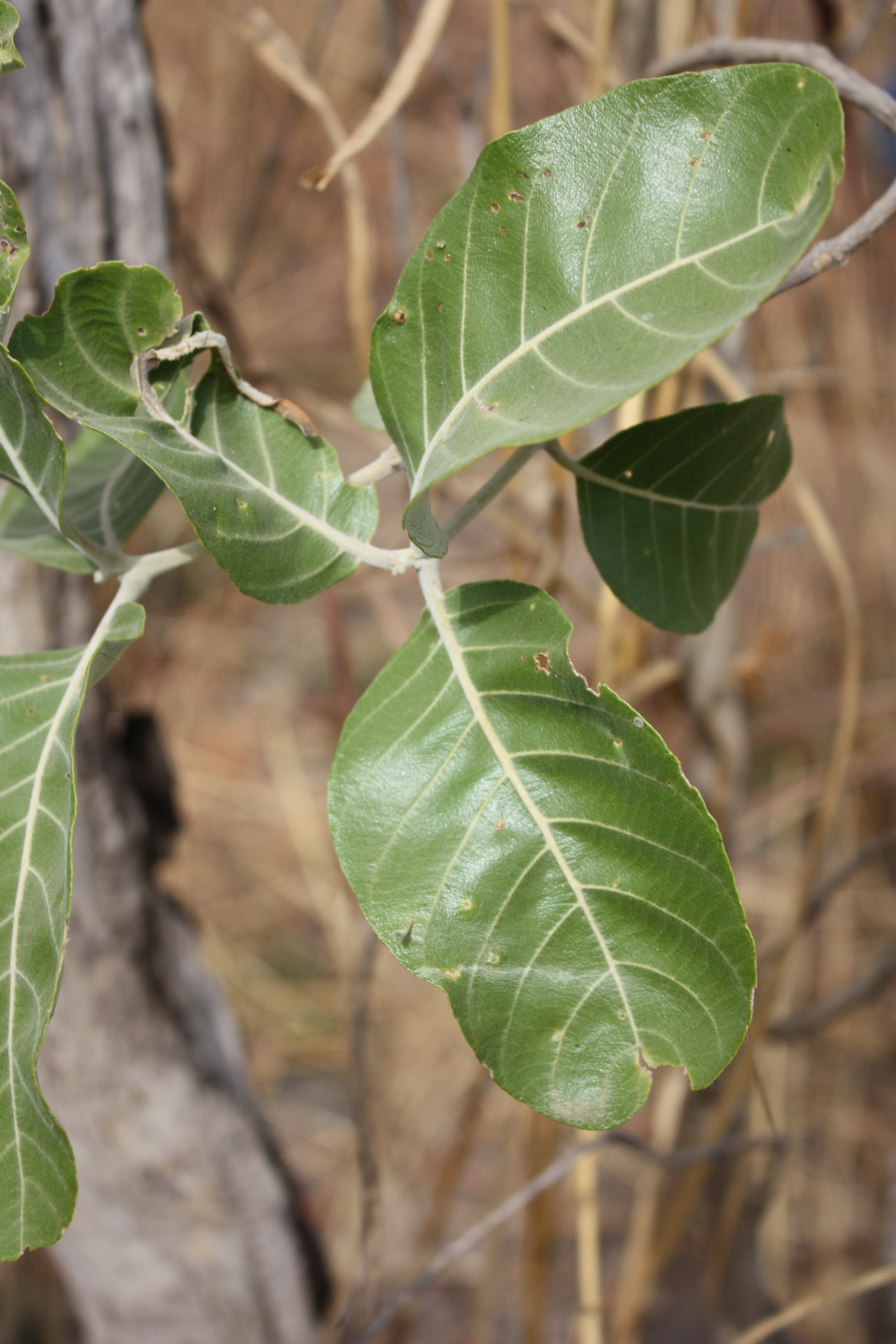
- Leaves of Combretum glutinosum, Pama Reserve, Burkina Faso

Scientific classification
- Kingdom: Plantae
- Clade: Tracheophytes
- Clade: Angiosperms
- Clade: Eudicots
- Clade: Rosids
- Order: Myrtales
- Family: Combretaceae
- Genus: Combretum
- Species: C. glutinosum

Binomial name
- Combretum glutinosum Perr. ex DC.

= Combretum glutinosum =

Species of tree

Combretum glutinosum is a shrub species of the genus Combretum, found in the Sahel belt in parts of Senegal, Burkina Faso, Ghana, Mali, the Gambia, Niger, Nigeria and Cameroon, across to parts of Sudan. It is known as dooki in Pulaar, Kantakara in Hausa, rat (or ratt) in Wolof, jambakatan kè in Mandinka, and yay (or nguuƭ) in Serer. Its synonyms are Combretum cordofanum Engl. & Diels, C. passargei Engl. & Diels, C. leonense Engl. & Diels.

== Habitat ==
Combretum glutinosum tends to grow in savanna type forests, in several soil types but is best suited to sandy and free draining soils. It is drought resistant and grows in areas of annual rainfall of 200–700 millimetres (7.9–27.6 in). Its growth is fast and profuse.

== Plant growth ==
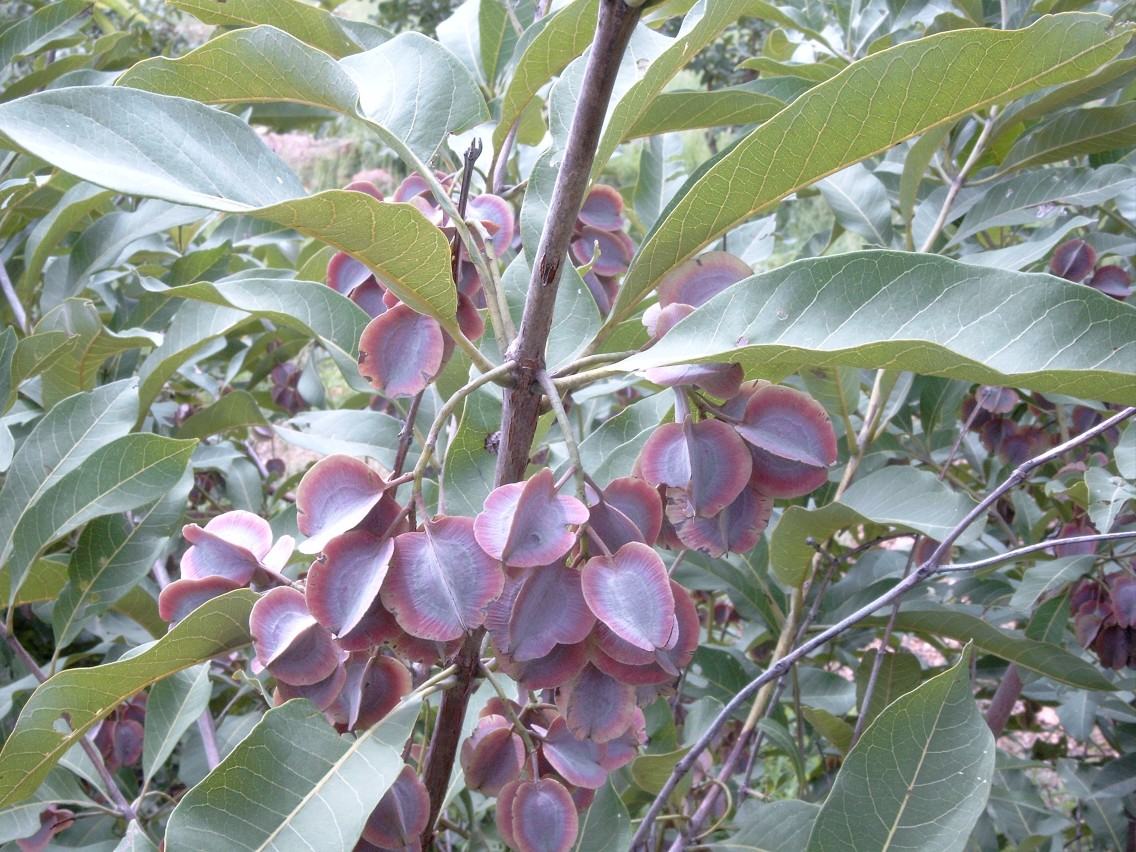
A species of Combretum in Burkina Faso

As a bushy shrub the plant grows up to 12 metres (39 ft) with an open crown with low branches that droop down, and is deciduous. The trunk is usually twisted and low branched, with grey-black rough bark. The thick leathery green leaves have a gummy feel to them and are glutinous when young. The plant flowers during the dry season after the bush fires which facilitate leaf flushing that supports flowering.

In Burkina Faso and Mali, flowers tend to appear between December and March, but this varies from area to area and flowers may appear as late as July. The fruit is a four-winged elliptic samara, and has a sticky feel, reddish and turns yellowish towards the end of the season. The fruit typically measures 2.5–4 centimetres (0.98–1.57 in) long and 1.5–3 centimetres (0.59–1.18 in) across. It bears fruits generally in January and fruiting lasts until November. Seeds are collected by shaking the branches of the tree. The seeds are oil bearing and one kilogram contains about 20,000 seeds, and it has an oil potential yield of c. 24%. The plant parasite which infects Combretum glutinosum is Loranthaceae.

Seeds stored for 18 months in temperature maintained at 4 °C (39 °F) have a germination rate of 84% when planted. 95% germination has also been reported by "following drying to moisture contents in equilibrium with 15% relative humidity and freezing for 1 month at (-) 20 °C." The optimum temperature for germination is reported to be between 25 °C (77 °F) and 30 °C (86 °F).

== Chemical properties ==
Chemical analysis of the leaves of the plant has identified Gallic acid, ellagic acid, flavonoid glycosides and 4 tannins; the tannins reported are 2,3-(S)-hexahydroxydiphenoyl-D-glucose, punicalin, punicalagin and combreglutinin. The black colour of the bogolan fabric is attributed to the chemical reaction of the tannins with the soluble iron compounds present in the fermented mud.

== Uses ==
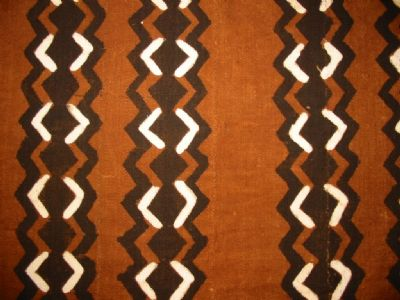
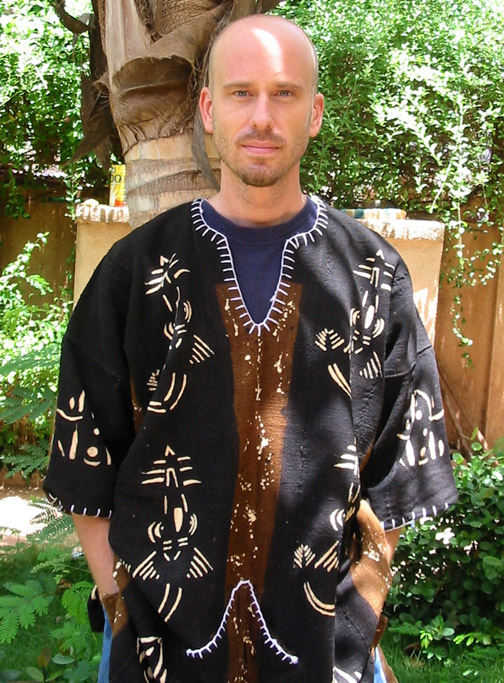
Left: Traditional mud cloth. Right: Hand made mud cloth.

The bark, leaves and roots are used by the people inhabiting Sahel Africa to produce yellow dye. The yellowish wood is "hard and extremely durable," and is used for building frames and tools, as well as fuel. The brownish or brownish yellow dyes are used in the textile industry and also in leather tanning and to dye mats. The plant is foraged by cattle, giraffes and other animals, and its young leaves are sometimes eaten as a vegetable by humans, sometimes with taro. The plant is in growing demand for the manufacture of bogolan textiles both in the local and international fashion world.

Cultural

A special textile known as the "mud cloth", "bògòlanfini" or "bogolan" is manufactured locally. It contains plant tannins mixed with iron salts present in the fermented mud. Bogolan is a specialized art form established by Mande women, in particularly those from Bamanan, Bobo, Dogon, Malinke, Minianka, and Senoufo groups.

Medicinal

The plants bark, leaves and roots are extracted for traditional medicinal uses for treating various ailments from influenza, and rheumatism, to sexual issues such as impotence and syphilis. It is commonly brewed as a tea in tropical West Africa to relieve stomach issues, and to treat malaria in a decoction with a number of other leaves obtained in the bush. In the Senegambia region, it is one of a number of trees whose twigs are used as "chewing sticks," used in lieu of toothbrushes to clean teeth, remove food particles after eating, and to chew for pleasure. It is also used to fill cavities of carious teeth, to dress wounds, for fumigation and as incense. A decoction of the leaves is used for baths to relieve fatigue. Amongs the Serer people of the Senegambia region (Senegal, Gambia, and Mauritania, and Guinea-Bissau), it is also used for the medicinal purposes described above, sometimes mixed with sugar as it is very bitter.
