= Flavono-ellagitannin =

Class of chemical compounds

The Flavono-ellagitannins or complex tannins are a class of tannins formed from the complexation of an ellagitannin with a flavonoid. Flavono-ellagitannins can be found in Quercus mongolica var. grosseserrata.

== Examples ==
- Acutissimin A
- Acutissimin B
- Camelliatannin G
- Epicutissimin A
- Mongolicains
  - Mongolicain A
  - Mongolicain B
