= 2,3-(Hexahydroxydiphenoyl)glucose =

Names
- Other names 2,3-(S)-Hexahydroxydiphenoyl-d-glucose

Identifiers
3D model (JSmol)	Interactive image
ChEMBL	ChEMBL458193
ChemSpider	23340129
PubChem CID	492390
- InChI: InChI=1S/C20H18O14/c21-3-8-13(26)16-17(20(31)32-8)34-19(30)5-2-7(23)12(25)15(28)10(5)9-4(18(29)33-16)1-6(22)11(24)14(9)27/h1-2,8,13,16-17,20-28,31H,3H2 Key: GEAGRKQCZVLNAU-UHFFFAOYSA-N
- SMILES: OC2OC(CO)C(O)C(OC3=O)C2OC(=O)c(cc(O)c(O)c1O)c1-c(c(O)c4O)c3cc4O

Properties
Chemical formula	C_{20}H_{18}O_{14}
Molar mass	482.350 g·mol^{−1}
- Except where otherwise noted, data are given for materials in their standard state (at 25 °C [77 °F], 100 kPa). Infobox references

2,3-(Hexahydroxydiphenoyl)glucose is an hydrolyzable tannin that can be found in Eucalyptus delegatensis, the alpine ash (Myrtaceae), in Terminalia catappa, the Bengal almond, and Combretum glutinosum (both Combretaceae).
