= Neoendorphin =

Class of opioid peptides

Neoendorphins are a group of endogenous opioid peptides derived from the proteolytic cleavage of prodynorphin. They include α-neoendorphin and β-neoendorphin. The α-neoendorphin is present in greater amounts in the brain than β-neoendorphin. Both are products of the dynorphin gene, which also expresses dynorphin A, dynorphin A_{1-8}, and dynorphin B. These opioid neurotransmitters are especially active in CNS receptors, whose primary function is pain sensation. These peptides all have the consensus amino acid sequence of Tyr-Gly-Gly-Phe-Met (met-enkephalin) or Tyr-Gly-Gly-Phe-Leu (leu-enkephalin). Binding of neoendorphins to opioid receptors, in the dorsal root ganglion (DRG) neurons results in the reduction of time of calcium-dependent action potential. The α-neoendorphins binds to μ-opioid, δ-opioid, κ-opioid receptor (KOR), cand β-neoendorphin binds to KOR.

== Types ==
	Sequence	Molecular Formula
α-neoendorphin	H-Tyr-Gly-Gly-Phe-Leu-Arg-Lys-Tyr-Pro-Lys-OH	C_{60}H_{89}N_{15}O_{13}
β-neoendorphin	H-Tyr-Gly-Gly-Phe-Leu-Arg-Lys-Tyr-Pro-OH	C_{54}H_{77}N_{13}O_{12}

== See also ==
- Endorphin
- Prodynorphin
