= Epicutissimin A =

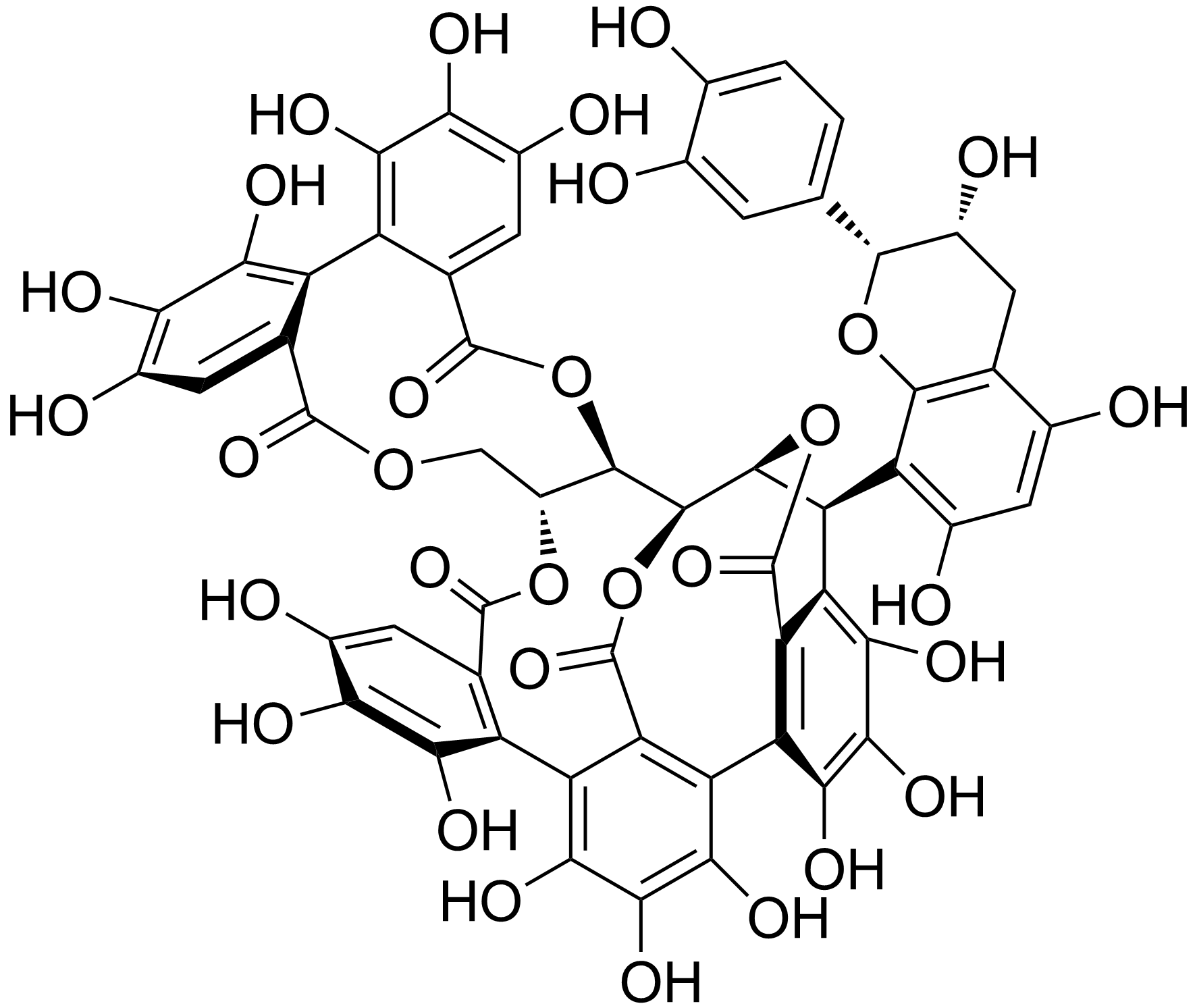
- Chemical structure of epicutissimin A

Identifiers
- Except where otherwise noted, data are given for materials in their standard state (at 25 °C [77 °F], 100 kPa). verify (what is ?) Infobox references

Epicutissimin A is a flavono-ellagitannin, a type of tannin.
