= Neomogroside =

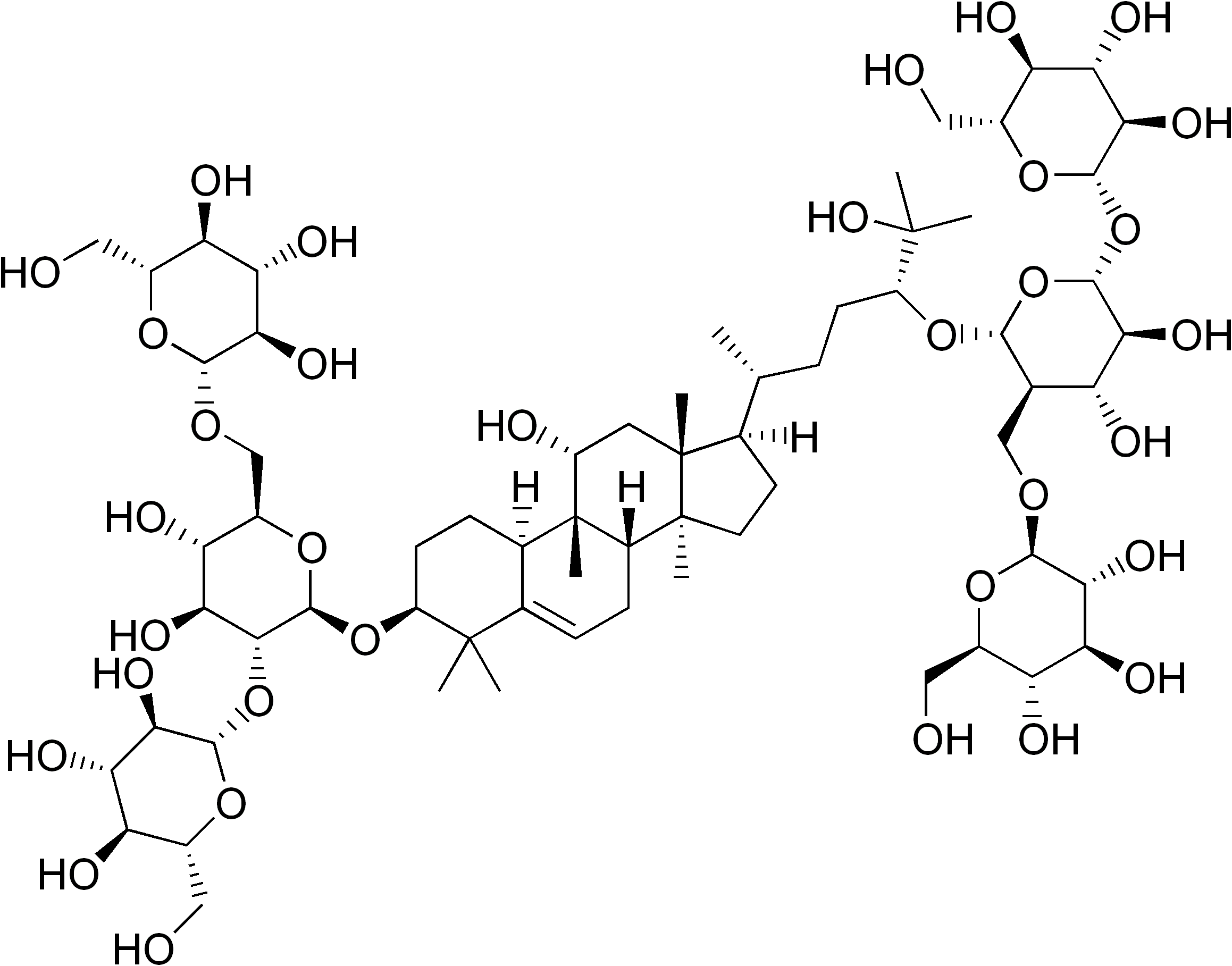

Names
- Other names (3α,9β,10β,11α,24R)-11,25-dihydroxy-9-methyl-19-norlanost-5-ene-3,24-diyl bis[O-β-D-glucopyranosyl-(12)-O-[β-D-glucopyranosyl]-β-D-glucopyranoside

Identifiers
CAS Number	189307-15-1
3D model (JSmol)	Interactive image
ChemSpider	24721801
CompTox Dashboard (EPA)	DTXSID601317961
- InChI: InChI=1S/C66H112O34/c1-24(9-13-37(63(4,5)88)97-55-25(22-89-56-50(84)44(78)39(73)29(18-67)91-56)38(72)49(83)60(99-55)100-59-53(87)47(81)42(76)32(21-70)94-59)26-15-16-64(6)34-12-10-27-28(66(34,8)35(71)17-65(26,64)7)11-14-36(62(27,2)3)96-61-54(98-58-52(86)46(80)41(75)31(20-69)93-58)48(82)43(77)33(95-61)23-90-57-51(85)45(79)40(74)30(19-68)92-57/h10,24-26,28-61,67-88H,9,11-23H2,1-8H3/t24-,25-,26-,28-,29-,30-,31-,32-,33-,34+,35-,36+,37-,38-,39-,40-,41-,42-,43-,44+,45+,46+,47+,48+,49+,50-,51-,52-,53-,54-,55-,56-,57-,58+,59+,60-,61+,64+,65-,66+/m1/s1 Key: KLARCXPUZABXOZ-SRMPMRICSA-N
- SMILES: C[C@H](CC[C@H](C(C)(C)O)O[C@H]1[C@@H]([C@H]([C@@H]([C@H](O1)O[C@H]2[C@@H]([C@H]([C@@H]([C@H](O2)CO)O)O)O)O)O)CO[C@H]3[C@@H]([C@H]([C@@H]([C@H](O3)CO)O)O)O)[C@H]4CC[C@@]5([C@@]4(C[C@H]([C@@]6([C@H]5CC=C7[C@H]6CC[C@@H](C7(C)C)O[C@H]8[C@@H]([C@H]([C@@H]([C@H](O8)CO[C@H]9[C@@H]([C@H]([C@@H]([C@H](O9)CO)O)O)O)O)O)O[C@H]1[C@@H]([C@H]([C@@H]([C@H](O1)CO)O)O)O)C)O)C)C

Properties
Chemical formula	C_{66}H_{112}O_{34}
Molar mass	1449.588 g·mol^{−1}
- Except where otherwise noted, data are given for materials in their standard state (at 25 °C [77 °F], 100 kPa). verify (what is ?) Infobox references

Neomogroside is a cucurbitane glycoside isolated from the fruit of Siraitia grosvenorii.

== See also ==
- Mogroside
- Siamenoside
