= Amidorphin =

Identifiers
CAS Number	94885-44-6
3D model (JSmol)	Interactive image
ChemSpider	17289039
PubChem CID	16132380
CompTox Dashboard (EPA)	DTXSID801029562
- InChI: InChI=1S/C131H200N30O43S2/c1-66(2)54-88(110(136)183)153-130(203)109(70(9)10)159-122(195)80(35-41-101(169)170)142-99(167)64-137-98(166)63-140-113(186)92(60-96(135)164)154-111(184)71(11)141-114(187)81(36-42-102(171)172)146-117(190)82(37-43-103(173)174)147-118(191)84(39-45-105(177)178)152-129(202)108(69(7)8)160-123(196)85(40-46-106(179)180)149-124(197)90(56-68(5)6)157-128(201)95-26-21-51-161(95)131(204)94(59-74-29-33-76(163)34-30-74)158-125(198)89(55-67(3)4)155-119(192)83(38-44-104(175)176)148-127(200)93(61-107(181)182)156-121(194)87(48-53-206-13)150-116(189)79(25-18-20-50-133)144-115(188)78(24-17-19-49-132)145-120(193)86(47-52-205-12)151-126(199)91(58-72-22-15-14-16-23-72)143-100(168)65-138-97(165)62-139-112(185)77(134)57-73-27-31-75(162)32-28-73/h14-16,22-23,27-34,66-71,77-95,108-109,162-163H,17-21,24-26,35-65,132-134H2,1-13H3,(H2,135,164)(H2,136,183)(H,137,166)(H,138,165)(H,139,185)(H,140,186)(H,141,187)(H,142,167)(H,143,168)(H,144,188)(H,145,193)(H,146,190)(H,147,191)(H,148,200)(H,149,197)(H,150,189)(H,151,199)(H,152,202)(H,153,203)(H,154,184)(H,155,192)(H,156,194)(H,157,201)(H,158,198)(H,159,195)(H,160,196)(H,169,170)(H,171,172)(H,173,174)(H,175,176)(H,177,178)(H,179,180)(H,181,182)/t71-,77-,78-,79-,80-,81-,82-,83-,84-,85-,86-,87-,88-,89-,90-,91-,92-,93-,94-,95-,108-,109-/m0/s1 Key: BRCPMMMERAGFCE-ZIFJQKEFSA-N; InChI=1S/C131H200N30O43S2/c1-66(2)54-88(110(136)183)153-130(203)109(70(9)10)159-122(195)80(35-41-101(169)170)142-99(167)64-137-98(166)63-140-113(186)92(60-96(135)164)154-111(184)71(11)141-114(187)81(36-42-102(171)172)146-117(190)82(37-43-103(173)174)147-118(191)84(39-45-105(177)178)152-129(202)108(69(7)8)160-123(196)85(40-46-106(179)180)149-124(197)90(56-68(5)6)157-128(201)95-26-21-51-161(95)131(204)94(59-74-29-33-76(163)34-30-74)158-125(198)89(55-67(3)4)155-119(192)83(38-44-104(175)176)148-127(200)93(61-107(181)182)156-121(194)87(48-53-206-13)150-116(189)79(25-18-20-50-133)144-115(188)78(24-17-19-49-132)145-120(193)86(47-52-205-12)151-126(199)91(58-72-22-15-14-16-23-72)143-100(168)65-138-97(165)62-139-112(185)77(134)57-73-27-31-75(162)32-28-73/h14-16,22-23,27-34,66-71,77-95,108-109,162-163H,17-21,24-26,35-65,132-134H2,1-13H3,(H2,135,164)(H2,136,183)(H,137,166)(H,138,165)(H,139,185)(H,140,186)(H,141,187)(H,142,167)(H,143,168)(H,144,188)(H,145,193)(H,146,190)(H,147,191)(H,148,200)(H,149,197)(H,150,189)(H,151,199)(H,152,202)(H,153,203)(H,154,184)(H,155,192)(H,156,194)(H,157,201)(H,158,198)(H,159,195)(H,160,196)(H,169,170)(H,171,172)(H,173,174)(H,175,176)(H,177,178)(H,179,180)(H,181,182)/t71-,77-,78-,79-,80-,81-,82-,83-,84-,85-,86-,87-,88-,89-,90-,91-,92-,93-,94-,95-,108-,109-/m0/s1
- SMILES: CC(C)CC(C(=O)N)NC(=O)C(C(C)C)NC(=O)C(CCC(=O)O)NC(=O)CNC(=O)CNC(=O)C(CC(=O)N)NC(=O)C(C)NC(=O)C(CCC(=O)O)NC(=O)C(CCC(=O)O)NC(=O)C(CCC(=O)O)NC(=O)C(C(C)C)NC(=O)C(CCC(=O)O)NC(=O)C(CC(C)C)NC(=O)C1CCCN1C(=O)C(Cc2ccc(cc2)O)NC(=O)C(CC(C)C)NC(=O)C(CCC(=O)O)NC(=O)C(CC(=O)O)NC(=O)C(CCSC)NC(=O)C(CCCCN)NC(=O)C(CCCCN)NC(=O)C(CCSC)NC(=O)C(Cc3ccccc3)NC(=O)CNC(=O)CNC(=O)C(Cc4ccc(cc4)O)N

Properties
Chemical formula	C_{131}H_{200}N_{30}O_{43}S_{2}
Molar mass	2947.29 g/mol
- Except where otherwise noted, data are given for materials in their standard state (at 25 °C [77 °F], 100 kPa). verify (what is ?) Infobox references

Amidorphin is an endogenous, C-terminally amidated, opioid peptide generated as a cleavage product of proenkephalin A in some mammalian species; in humans and most other species, the peptide is 1 residue longer and is not amidated. Amidorphin is widely distributed in the mammalian brain, with particularly high concentrations found in the striatum, and outside of the brain in adrenal medulla and posterior pituitary. The 26-residue peptide named amidorphin is found in several species including bovine (Bos taurus), sheep (Ovis aries), and pig (Sus scrofa). Humans and commonly studied lab animals (mice, rats) produce a 27-residue peptide that does not have an amidated C-terminal residue; this is due to the absence of a Gly in the precursor sequence and replacement with Ala, which is not a substrate for the amidating enzyme (Peptidyl-glycine alpha-amidating monooxygenase). The properties of the 27-residue peptide are presumably similar to those of amidorphin, although this has not been adequately tested.

In some brain areas, amidorphin is extensively further reduced into smaller fragments, such as the non-opioid peptide amidorphin-(8-26), or in humans, amidorphin-8-27. Cleavage of amidorphin into these smaller fragments releases the N-terminal [Met]-enkephalin sequence of amidorphin.

== See also ==
- Opioid peptide
