= Β-Neoendorphin =

β-Neoendorphin

Names
- Other names Beta-Neoendorphin

Identifiers
CAS Number	77739-21-0
3D model (JSmol)	Interactive image
ChemSpider	109029
IUPHAR/BPS	1644
PubChem CID	122260
CompTox Dashboard (EPA)	DTXSID401029639
- InChI: InChI=1S/C54H77N13O12/c1-32(2)26-41(65-51(76)42(28-33-10-4-3-5-11-33)62-46(71)31-60-45(70)30-61-47(72)38(56)27-34-15-19-36(68)20-16-34)50(75)64-40(13-8-24-59-54(57)58)48(73)63-39(12-6-7-23-55)49(74)66-43(29-35-17-21-37(69)22-18-35)52(77)67-25-9-14-44(67)53(78)79/h3-5,10-11,15-22,32,38-44,68-69H,6-9,12-14,23-31,55-56H2,1-2H3,(H,60,70)(H,61,72)(H,62,71)(H,63,73)(H,64,75)(H,65,76)(H,66,74)(H,78,79)(H4,57,58,59)/t38-,39-,40-,41-,42-,43-,44-/m0/s1 Key: RTXIYIQLESPXIV-VLOLPVCOSA-N; InChI=1/C54H77N13O12/c1-32(2)26-41(65-51(76)42(28-33-10-4-3-5-11-33)62-46(71)31-60-45(70)30-61-47(72)38(56)27-34-15-19-36(68)20-16-34)50(75)64-40(13-8-24-59-54(57)58)48(73)63-39(12-6-7-23-55)49(74)66-43(29-35-17-21-37(69)22-18-35)52(77)67-25-9-14-44(67)53(78)79/h3-5,10-11,15-22,32,38-44,68-69H,6-9,12-14,23-31,55-56H2,1-2H3,(H,60,70)(H,61,72)(H,62,71)(H,63,73)(H,64,75)(H,65,76)(H,66,74)(H,78,79)(H4,57,58,59)/t38-,39-,40-,41-,42-,43-,44-/m0/s1 Key: RTXIYIQLESPXIV-VLOLPVCOBE
- SMILES: N[C@@H](CC1=CC=C(O)C=C1)C(NCC(NCC(N[C@@H](CC2=CC=CC=C2)C(N[C@@H](CC(C)C)C(N[C@@H](CCCNC(N)=N)C(N[C@@H](CCCCN)C(N[C@@H](CC3=CC=C(O)C=C3)C(N4CCC[C@H]4C(O)=O)=O)=O)=O)=O)=O)=O)=O)=O

Properties
Chemical formula	C_{54}H_{77}N_{13}O_{12}
Molar mass	1100.289 g·mol^{−1}
- Except where otherwise noted, data are given for materials in their standard state (at 25 °C [77 °F], 100 kPa). Infobox references

β-Neoendorphin is an endogenous opioid peptide with a nonapeptide structure and the amino acid sequence Tyr-Gly-Gly-Phe-Leu-Arg-Lys-Tyr-Pro (YGGFLRKYP). It's one of the two neoendorphins.

β-Neoendorphins (β-NEP) have the capability to stimulate wound healing by accelerating keratinocyte migration. This is achieved by β-NEP's activation of mitogen-activated protein kinase (MAPK) and extracellular signal-regulated kinases 1 and 2 (ERK 1 and ERK 2); along with the upregulation of matrix metalloproteinase 2 and 9 (MMP-2 and MMP-9). Wound healing by β-NEP results in migration without consequences on proliferation in human keratinocytes.

== See also ==
- α-Neoendorphin
- Neoendorphin
- Endorphin
