= Acutissimin A =

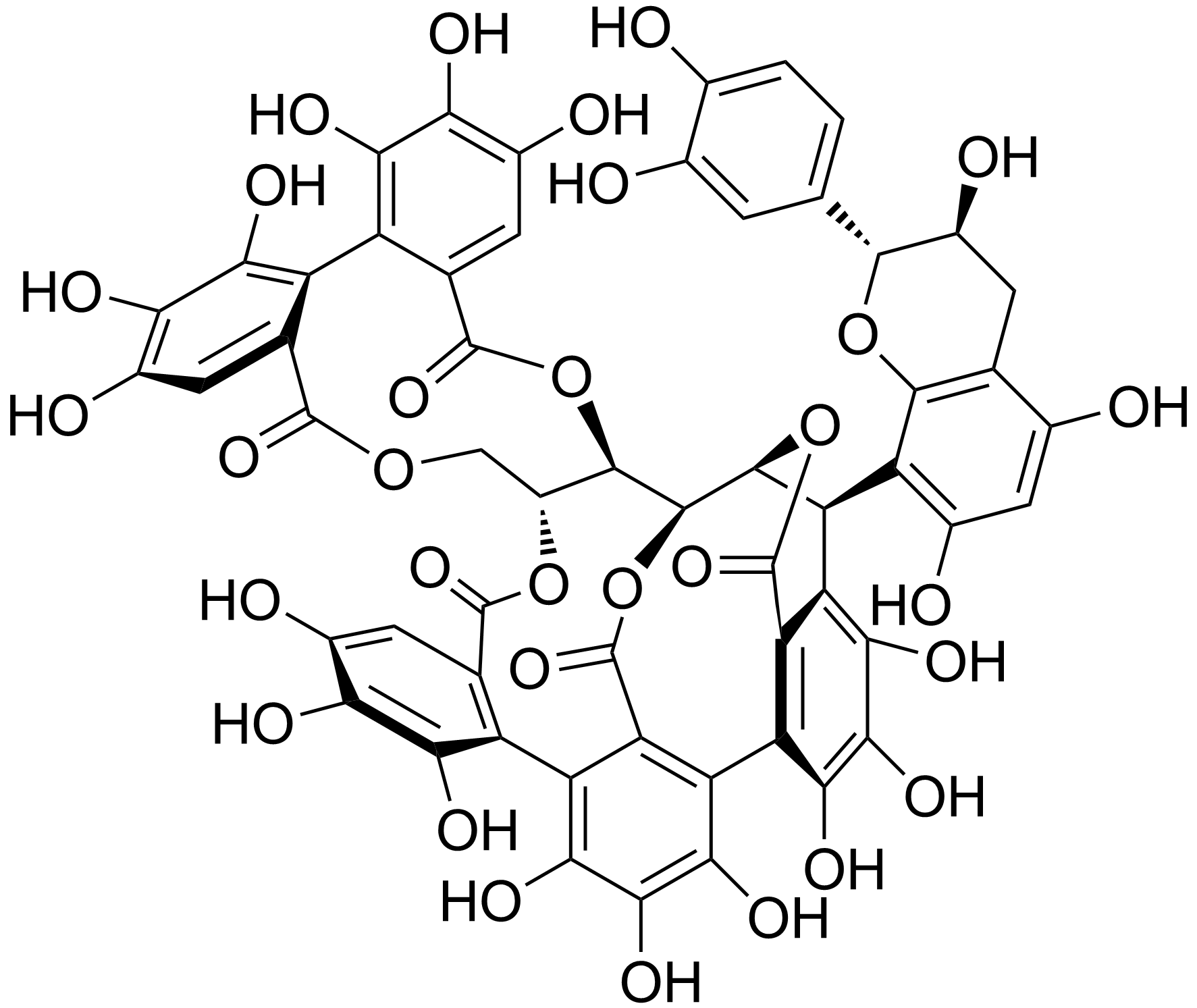
- Chemical structure of acutissimin A

Identifiers
CAS Number	108906-66-7
3D model (JSmol)	Interactive image
ChemSpider	10258694
PubChem CID	44559699
- InChI: InChI=1S/C56H38O31/c57-15-2-1-10(3-17(15)59)47-22(64)4-11-16(58)8-18(60)27(48(11)84-47)32-31-34-30(43(73)46(76)44(31)74)29-33-28(41(71)45(75)42(29)72)26-14(7-21(63)37(67)40(26)70)53(78)83-23-9-82-52(77)12-5-19(61)35(65)38(68)24(12)25-13(6-20(62)36(66)39(25)69)54(79)85-49(23)51(87-56(33)81)50(32)86-55(34)80/h1-3,5-8,22-23,32,47,49-51,57-76H,4,9H2/t22-,23+,32+,47+,49+,50-,51-/m0/s1 Key: DRHVFLXLYQESEQ-DHGKJAGISA-N; InChI=1/C56H38O31/c57-15-2-1-10(3-17(15)59)47-22(64)4-11-16(58)8-18(60)27(48(11)84-47)32-31-34-30(43(73)46(76)44(31)74)29-33-28(41(71)45(75)42(29)72)26-14(7-21(63)37(67)40(26)70)53(78)83-23-9-82-52(77)12-5-19(61)35(65)38(68)24(12)25-13(6-20(62)36(66)39(25)69)54(79)85-49(23)51(87-56(33)81)50(32)86-55(34)80/h1-3,5-8,22-23,32,47,49-51,57-76H,4,9H2/t22-,23+,32+,47+,49+,50-,51-/m0/s1 Key: DRHVFLXLYQESEQ-DHGKJAGIBL
- SMILES: OC1=C(C2=C(O)C(O)=C(O)C=C2C(O[C@@H]([C@H](OC3=O)[C@@H](O4)[C@@H](C5=C(O)C=C(O)C6=C5O[C@H](C7=CC=C(O)C(O)=C7)[C@@H](O)C6)C8=C(O)C(O)=C(O)C(C9=C3C%10=C(O)C(O)=C9O)=C8C4=O)[C@H](OC(C%11=C%10C(O)=C(O)C(O)=C%11)=O)COC%12=O)=O)C%12=CC(O)=C1O

Properties
Chemical formula	C_{56}H_{38}O_{31}
Molar mass	1206.88 g/mol
- Except where otherwise noted, data are given for materials in their standard state (at 25 °C [77 °F], 100 kPa). verify (what is ?) Infobox references

Acutissimin A is a flavono-ellagitannin, a type of tannin formed from the linking of a flavonoid with an ellagitannin.

In 2003, scientists at Institut Européen de Chimie et Biologie in Pessac, France found that when the oak tannin vescalagin interacts with a flavanoid in wine acutissimin A is created. In separate studies this phenolic compound has been shown to be 250 times more effective than the pharmaceutical drug Etoposide in stopping the growth of cancerous tumors.

== See also ==
- Phenolic compounds in wine
