= Slotoxin =

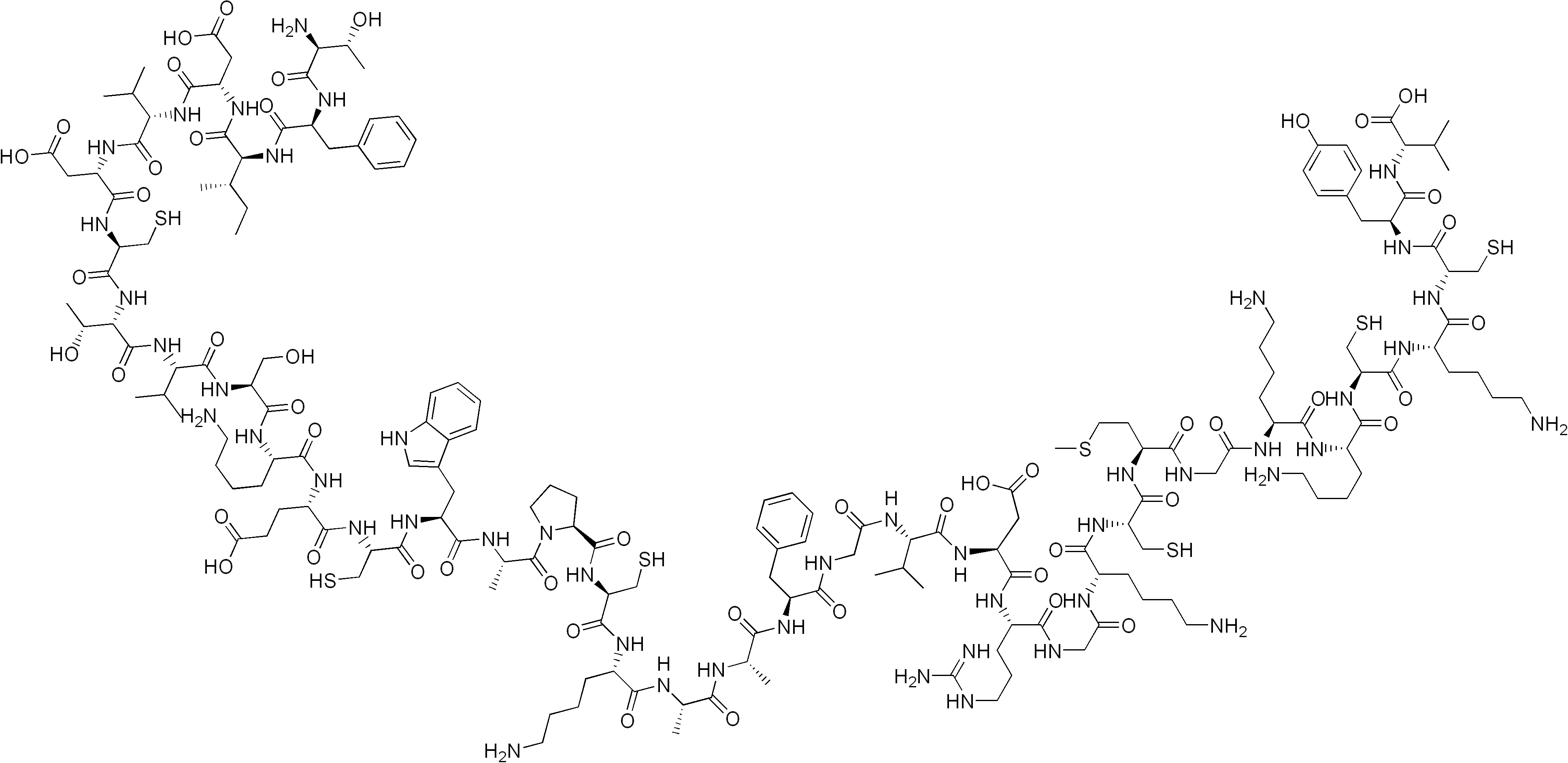

Names
- IUPAC name L-threonyl-L-phenylalanyl-L-isoleucyl-L-alpha-aspartyl-L-valyl-L-alpha-aspartyl-L-cysteinyl-L-threonyl-L-valyl-L-seryl-L-lysyl-L-alpha-glutamyl-L-cysteinyl-L-tryptophyl-L-alanyl-L-prolyl-L-cysteinyl-L-lysyl-L-alanyl-L-alanyl-L-phenylalanyl-glycyl-L-valyl-L-alpha-aspartyl-L-arginyl-glycyl-L-lysyl-L-cysteinyl-L-methionyl-glycyl-L-lysyl-L-lysyl-L-cysteinyl-L-lysyl-L-cysteinyl-L-tyrosyl-L-valine (7->28),(13->33),(17->35)-tris(disulfide)

Identifiers
CAS Number	401470-29-9
3D model (JSmol)	Interactive image
ChemSpider	17290394
IUPHAR/BPS	2310
PubChem CID	16133816
- InChI: InChI=1S/C177H275N47O50S7/c1-17-92(10)141(222-159(256)116(71-99-42-22-19-23-43-99)207-169(266)136(184)96(14)226)173(270)210-120(76-135(238)239)160(257)219-138(89(4)5)171(268)209-119(75-134(236)237)157(254)216-127-87-281-277-83-123-163(260)203-113(60-69-275-16)146(243)190-79-130(230)195-106(46-26-32-61-178)149(246)198-110(50-30-36-65-182)152(249)213-122-82-276-278-85-125(215-154(251)112(58-59-132(232)233)202-151(248)109(49-29-35-64-181)199-161(258)121(81-225)211-172(269)139(90(6)7)220-174(271)142(97(15)227)223-167(127)264)166(263)206-117(73-101-77-188-104-45-25-24-44-103(101)104)155(252)194-95(13)175(272)224-68-39-53-128(224)168(265)217-126(86-280-279-84-124(214-153(250)111(201-162(122)259)51-31-37-66-183)165(262)205-115(72-100-54-56-102(228)57-55-100)158(255)221-140(91(8)9)176(273)274)164(261)200-108(48-28-34-63-180)148(245)193-93(11)143(240)192-94(12)144(241)204-114(70-98-40-20-18-21-41-98)147(244)191-80-131(231)218-137(88(2)3)170(267)208-118(74-133(234)235)156(253)197-105(52-38-67-187-177(185)186)145(242)189-78-129(229)196-107(150(247)212-123)47-27-33-62-179/h18-25,40-45,54-57,77,88-97,105-128,136-142,188,225-228H,17,26-39,46-53,58-76,78-87,178-184H2,1-16H3,(H,189,242)(H,190,243)(H,191,244)(H,192,240)(H,193,245)(H,194,252)(H,195,230)(H,196,229)(H,197,253)(H,198,246)(H,199,258)(H,200,261)(H,201,259)(H,202,248)(H,203,260)(H,204,241)(H,205,262)(H,206,263)(H,207,266)(H,208,267)(H,209,268)(H,210,270)(H,211,269)(H,212,247)(H,213,249)(H,214,250)(H,215,251)(H,216,254)(H,217,265)(H,218,231)(H,219,257)(H,220,271)(H,221,255)(H,222,256)(H,223,264)(H,232,233)(H,234,235)(H,236,237)(H,238,239)(H,273,274)(H4,185,186,187)/t92-,93-,94-,95-,96+,97+,105-,106-,107-,108-,109-,110-,111-,112-,113-,114-,115-,116-,117-,118-,119-,120-,121-,122-,123-,124-,125-,126-,127-,128-,136-,137-,138-,139-,140-,141-,142-/m0/s1 Key: ZVNHBACJFBOPKF-UTPLJIOFSA-N
- SMILES: CC[C@H](C)[C@@H](C(=O)N[C@@H](CC(=O)O)C(=O)N[C@@H](C(C)C)C(=O)N[C@@H](CC(=O)O)C(=O)N[C@H]1CSSC[C@H]2C(=O)N[C@H](C(=O)NCC(=O)N[C@H](C(=O)N[C@H](C(=O)N[C@H]3CSSC[C@@H](C(=O)N[C@H](C(=O)N[C@H](C(=O)N4CCC[C@H]4C(=O)N[C@@H](CSSC[C@H](NC(=O)[C@@H](NC3=O)CCCCN)C(=O)N[C@@H](Cc5ccc(cc5)O)C(=O)N[C@@H](C(C)C)C(=O)O)C(=O)N[C@H](C(=O)N[C@H](C(=O)N[C@H](C(=O)N[C@H](C(=O)NCC(=O)N[C@H](C(=O)N[C@H](C(=O)N[C@H](C(=O)NCC(=O)N[C@H](C(=O)N2)CCCCN)CCCNC(=N)N)CC(=O)O)C(C)C)Cc6ccccc6)C)C)CCCCN)C)Cc7c[nH]c8c7cccc8)NC(=O)[C@@H](NC(=O)[C@@H](NC(=O)[C@@H](NC(=O)[C@@H](NC(=O)[C@@H](NC1=O)[C@@H](C)O)C(C)C)CO)CCCCN)CCC(=O)O)CCCCN)CCCCN)CCSC)NC(=O)[C@H](Cc9ccccc9)NC(=O)[C@H]([C@@H](C)O)N

Properties
Chemical formula	C_{177}H_{281}N_{47}O_{50}S_{7}
Molar mass	4091.86 g/mol
- Except where otherwise noted, data are given for materials in their standard state (at 25 °C [77 °F], 100 kPa). verify (what is ?) Infobox references

Slotoxin is a peptide from Centruroides noxius Hoffmann scorpion venom. It belongs to the short scorpion toxin superfamily.

== Method of isolation ==
For isolation of slotoxin, scorpions of the species Centruroides noxius are milked for venom in the laboratory. The crude venom is being dissolved in distilled water and spun. The supernatant is separated. The active fraction is then further separated.

== Structure ==
The 37 amino acid peptide belongs to the charybdotoxin sub-family (αKTx1) and was numbered member 11. αKTx1.11 revealed specificity for mammalian MaxiK channels (hSlo), thus, was named slotoxin. Its sequence is H-Thr-Phe-Ile-Asp-Val-Asp-Cys(1)-Thr-Val-Ser-Lys-Glu-Cys(2)-Trp-Ala-Pro-Cys(3)-Lys-Ala-Ala-Phe-Gly-Val-Asp-Arg-Gly-Lys-Cys(1)-Met-Gly-Lys-Lys-Cys(2)-Lys-Cys(3)-Tyr-Val-OH.

== Targets ==
Slotoxin reversibly blocks the high conductance calcium-activated potassium channels composed of only α-subunits (Kd = 1.5 nM). Unreversibly blocks the high conductance calcium-activated potassium channels composed of α- and β1-subunits. Unreversibly and weakly blocks the high conductance calcium-activated potassium channels composed of α- and β4-subunits. It shows no activity on other potassium channels.

== Mode of action ==
The positively charged surface (C-terminal) of SloTx has a specific short-range interaction with the negatively charged pore region of potassium-channels leading to channel blockade. Specific hydrophobic residue-residue interactions between SloTx and MaxiK channels may also contribute to toxin-channel interaction. Another region in the potassium channel (flanking the N-terminal of SloTx) is situated in the face opposite to the site of toxin-pore interaction, and might have implications for the modulation of channel blockade by the MaxiK β subunits. SloTx is suggested to interact with the MaxiK channel pore-forming α-subunit by blocking the pore via a bimolecular reaction.

== Toxicity ==
The large-conductance voltage and calcium-activated potassium (MaxiK, BK) channels are intrinsic membrane proteins that regulate excitability in a large variety of tissues including brain and smooth muscle.
