= Aminocandin =

Chemical compound

Clinical data
- Other names: IP-960, HMR-3270
- ATC code: none

Identifiers
- IUPAC name: 1-[4-[(2-aminoethyl)amino]-N2-[(4'-octyloxy)[1,1'-biohenyl]-4-yl]carbonyl]-L-ornithine]-4-[4-(4-hydroxyphenyl)-L-threonine]-5-L-serine-echinocandin B
- CAS Number: 227472-48-2
- PubChem CID: 16072305
- ChemSpider: 17231781
- ChEBI: CHEBI:84073
- CompTox Dashboard (EPA): DTXSID301336192

Chemical and physical data
- Formula: C_{56}H_{79}N_{9}O_{13}
- Molar mass: 1086.298 g·mol^{−1}
- 3D model (JSmol): Interactive image
- SMILES: CCCCCCCCOc1ccc(cc1)c2ccc(cc2)C(=O)NC3CC(CNC(=O)[C@@H]4[C@H]([C@H](CN4C(=O)[C@H](NC(=O)[C@@H](NC(=O)[C@@H]5C[C@H](CN5C(=O)[C@@H](NC3=O)[C@@H](C)O)O)[C@@H](Cc6ccccc6)O)CO)C)O)NCCN
- InChI: InChI=1S/C56H79N9O13/c1-4-5-6-7-8-12-25-78-41-21-19-37(20-22-41)36-15-17-38(18-16-36)50(71)60-42-27-39(58-24-23-57)29-59-54(75)48-49(70)33(2)30-65(48)55(76)43(32-66)61-53(74)47(45(69)26-35-13-10-9-11-14-35)63-52(73)44-28-40(68)31-64(44)56(77)46(34(3)67)62-51(42)72/h9-11,13-22,33-34,39-40,42-49,58,66-70H,4-8,12,23-32,57H2,1-3H3,(H,59,75)(H,60,71)(H,61,74)(H,62,72)(H,63,73)/t33-,34+,39?,40+,42?,43+,44-,45+,46-,47-,48-,49-/m0/s1; Key:JYBUOENGZWTZGU-JZCGONIASA-N

Aminocandin is an echinocandin antifungal. It works by targeting the glucan in fungal cell walls.
