= Hectane =

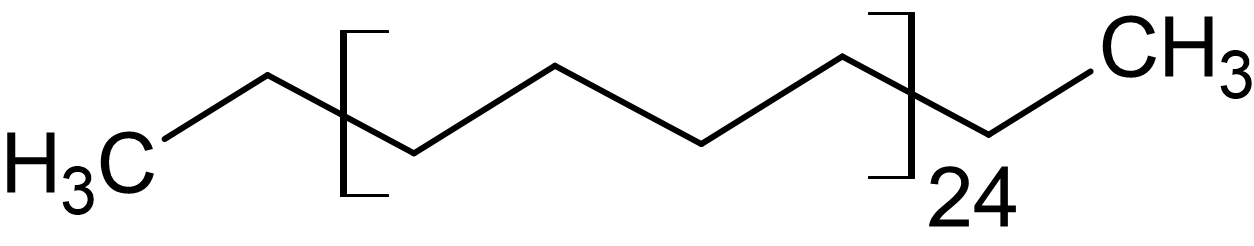

Names
- Preferred IUPAC name Decacontane

Identifiers
CAS Number	6703-98-6
3D model (JSmol)	Interactive image
ChemSpider	20035403
PubChem CID	14009497
CompTox Dashboard (EPA)	DTXSID70554262
- InChI: InChI=1S/C100H202/c1-3-5-7-9-11-13-15-17-19-21-23-25-27-29-31-33-35-37-39-41-43-45-47-49-51-53-55-57-59-61-63-65-67-69-71-73-75-77-79-81-83-85-87-89-91-93-95-97-99-100-98-96-94-92-90-88-86-84-82-80-78-76-74-72-70-68-66-64-62-60-58-56-54-52-50-48-46-44-42-40-38-36-34-32-30-28-26-24-22-20-18-16-14-12-10-8-6-4-2/h3-100H2,1-2H3 Key: AFVYWKMVEGBLGD-UHFFFAOYSA-N
- SMILES: CCCCCCCCCCCCCCCCCCCCCCCCCCCCCCCCCCCCCCCCCCCCCCCCCCCCCCCCCCCCCCCCCCCCCCCCCCCCCCCCCCCCCCCCCCCCCCCCCCCC

Properties
Chemical formula	C_{100}H_{202}
Molar mass	1404.716 g·mol^{−1}
Appearance	solid
Density	0.836 g/cm^{3}
Melting point	115.2 °C
Boiling point	720.9 °C
Solubility in water	insoluble
- Except where otherwise noted, data are given for materials in their standard state (at 25 °C [77 °F], 100 kPa). Infobox references

Hectane is an organic compound from the class of straight-chain alkanes, or saturated hydrocarbons. It has 100 carbon atoms in a single chain, without branching. Under normal conditions, it is in a solid state. The chemical formula is C_{100}H_{202}. The number of possible structural isomers of hectane is 592,107 × 10^{34}.

== Synthesis ==
The compound can be prepared by reacting 1-iodopentadecane with sodium metal and can be recrystallized from xylene.

== Uses ==
It is used as an additive to paraffin and petroleum jelly.
