= Mogroside =

Group of chemical compounds

Structural formula of mogroside 2 E

A mogroside is a triterpene glycoside of cucurbitane derivatives found in certain plants, such as the fruit of the gourd vine Siraitia grosvenorii (known as monkfruit or luohan guo). Mogrosides are extracted from S. grosvenorii and used in the manufacture of sugar substitutes.

== Mogrosides ==
Structural formula of mogroside V

Structural formula of mogroside VI

Mogrosides include:

- Mogrol
- Mogroside II A_{1}
- Mogroside II B
- 7-Oxomogroside II E
- 11-Oxomogroside A_{1}
- Mogroside III A_{2}
- 11-Deoxymogroside III
- 11-Oxomogroside IV A
- Mogroside V
- 7-Oxomogroside V
- 11-Oxo-mogroside V
- Mogroside VI
- Siamenoside I

The total content of mogrosides in Siraitia grosvenorii fruit is 3.8% with Mogroside V having the highest content (0.8% to 1.3% w/w).

== Biosynthesis ==
One analysis of 200 candidate genes of Siraitia grosvenorii revealed five enzyme families involved in the synthesis of mogroside V: squalene epoxidases, triterpenoid synthases, epoxide hydrolases, cytochrome P450s, and UDP-glucosyltransferases. The metabolic pathway for mogroside biosynthesis involves an initial stage of fruit development when squalene is metabolized to di-glucosylated, tetra-hydroxycucurbitadienols, then during fruit maturation, branched glucosyl groups are added and catalyzed, leading to the sweet M4, M5, and M6 mogrosides.

== Stability ==
Mogroside V appears to be heat stable in the range of 100 to 150 degrees Celsius for 4 hours and up to 8 hours in boiling water. It is stable at a pH of between 3 and 12 when stored from 2 to 8 degrees Celsius.

== Uses ==
Some mogrosides are used in traditional Chinese medicine and some are extracted for manufacturing as sweeteners. Mogroside V extract from S. grosvenorii fruit is 250 times sweeter than sucrose, sold commercially in Norbu (sweetener).
