= Protodioscin =

Chemical compound

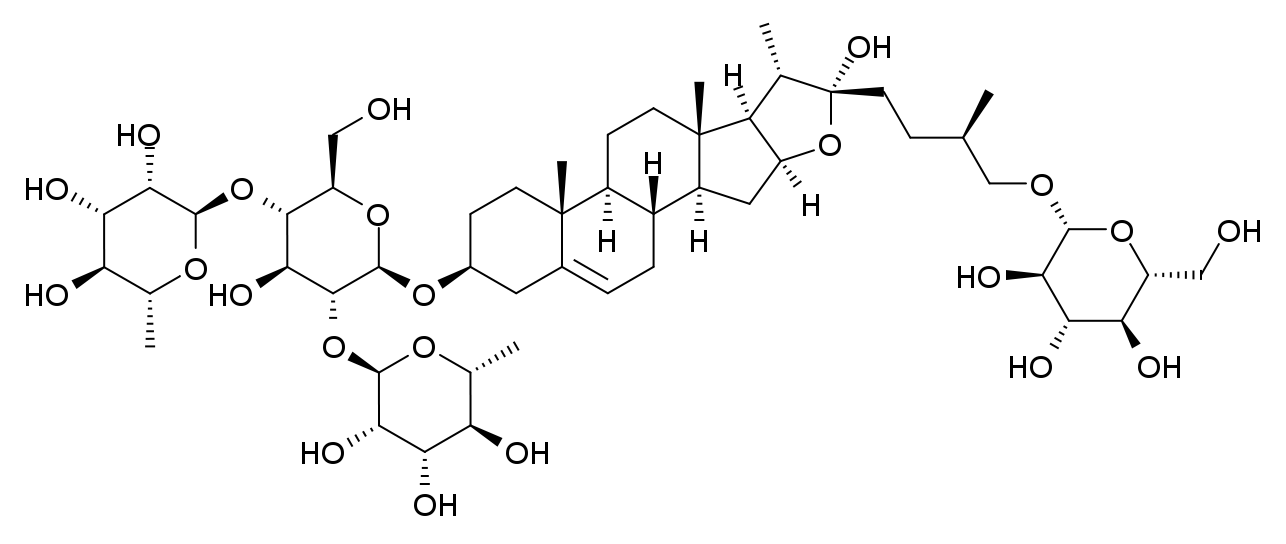

Clinical data
- Routes of administration: Oral
- ATC code: none

Legal status
- Legal status: In general: legal

Identifiers
- IUPAC name: 26-O-beta-D-Glycopyranosyl-22-hydroxyfurost-5-ene-3beta,26-diol-3-O-beta-diglucorhamnoside
- CAS Number: 55056-80-9
- PubChem CID: 441891
- ChemSpider: 390467
- UNII: D0LC3PH24P
- ChEBI: CHEBI:8588

Chemical and physical data
- Formula: C_{51}H_{84}O_{22}
- Molar mass: 1049.211 g·mol^{−1}
- 3D model (JSmol): Interactive image
- SMILES: C[C@H]1[C@H]2[C@H](C[C@@H]3[C@@]2(CC[C@H]4[C@H]3CC=C5[C@@]4(CC[C@@H](C5)O[C@H]6[C@@H]([C@H]([C@@H]([C@H](O6)CO)O[C@H]7[C@@H]([C@@H]([C@H]([C@@H](O7)C)O)O)O)O)O[C@H]8[C@@H]([C@@H]([C@H]([C@@H](O8)C)O)O)O)C)C)O[C@@]1(CC[C@@H](C)CO[C@H]9[C@@H]([C@H]([C@@H]([C@H](O9)CO)O)O)O)O
- InChI: InChI=1S/C51H84O22/c1-20(19-65-45-39(60)38(59)35(56)30(17-52)69-45)9-14-51(64)21(2)32-29(73-51)16-28-26-8-7-24-15-25(10-12-49(24,5)27(26)11-13-50(28,32)6)68-48-44(72-47-41(62)37(58)34(55)23(4)67-47)42(63)43(31(18-53)70-48)71-46-40(61)36(57)33(54)22(3)66-46/h7,20-23,25-48,52-64H,8-19H2,1-6H3/t20-,21+,22+,23+,25+,26-,27+,28+,29+,30-,31-,32+,33+,34+,35-,36-,37-,38+,39-,40-,41-,42+,43-,44-,45-,46+,47+,48-,49+,50+,51-/m1/s1; Key:LVTJOONKWUXEFR-UEZXSUPNSA-N

Protodioscin is a steroidal saponin compound found in a number of plant species, most notably in the Tribulus, Trigonella Dioscorea and Trillium families. It is best known as the putative active component of the herbal aphrodisiac plant Tribulus terrestris.

Extracts of T. terrestris standardized for protodioscin content have been shown to produce proerectile effects in isolated tissues and aphrodisiac activity in several animal models. Protodioscin is thought to contribute to increased androgen receptor immunoreactivity in some tissues, likely as a secondary effect of elevated levels of endogenous androgens such as testosterone and dihydrotestosterone (DHT). This increase in androgen receptor immunoreactivity has been observed after administration of Tribulus terrestris extracts, but current evidence does not support the view that protodioscin acts primarily or directly by raising the density of androgen receptors; instead, it may enhance androgen receptor expression indirectly through its influence on androgen levels.

Although the precise mechanism has not been fully established, protodioscin has been reported to stimulate the release of nitric oxide in corpus cavernosum tissue, as well as to significantly increase circulating levels of testosterone, dihydrotestosterone, and dehydroepiandrosterone in animal studies. However, clinical studies in humans have not demonstrated consistent efficacy, and the therapeutic value of T. terrestris extracts remains controversial.
