= Cobatoxin =

Cobatoxin 1
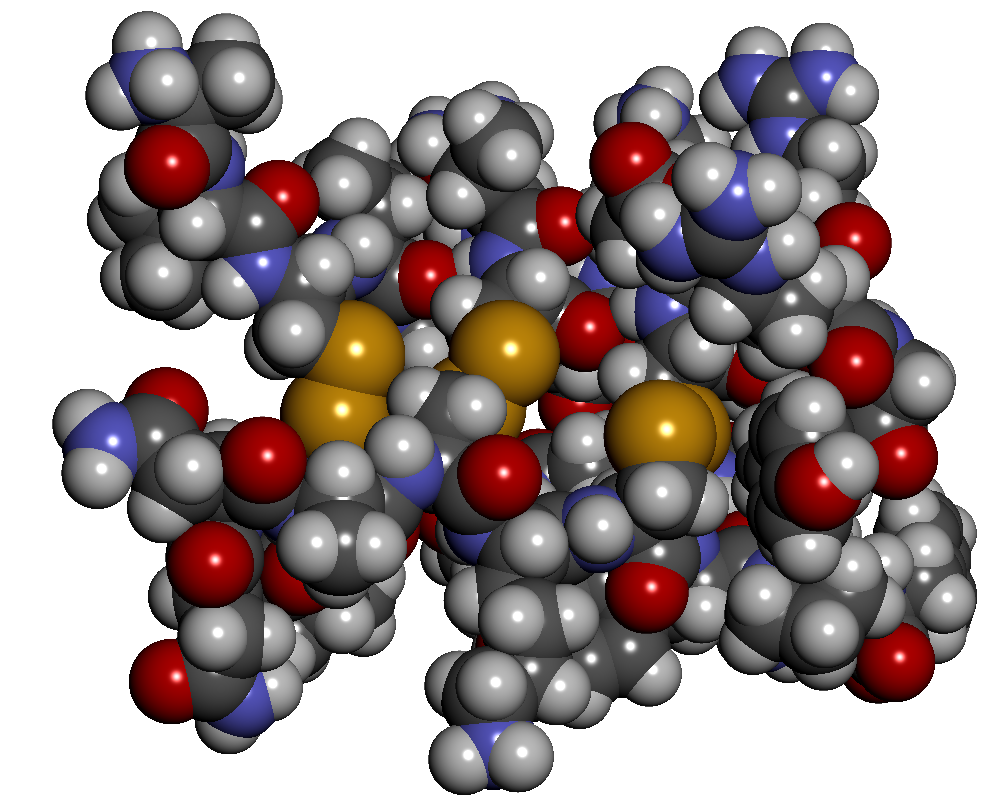
- Space-filling diagram of cobatoxin 1

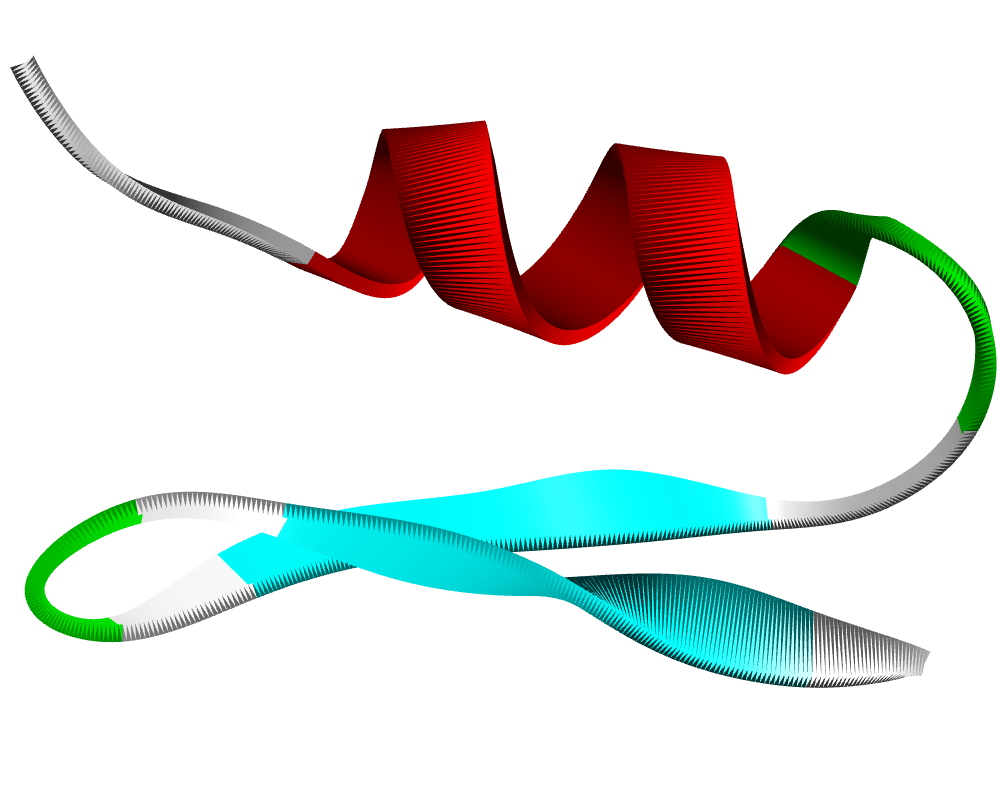
- Ribbon diagram of cobatoxin 1

Identifiers
CAS Number	211688-17-4
3D model (JSmol)	Interactive image
ChemSpider	none
- InChI: InChI=1S/C156H244N50O45S6/c1-10-77(6)121-149(247)192-100(63-114(163)214)137(235)188-99(62-113(162)213)134(232)178-79(8)124(222)196-106-69-252-255-72-109-142(240)190-101(64-117(217)218)138(236)183-92(26-13-17-51-159)130(228)189-102(65-118(219)220)139(237)199-107(70-253-254-71-108(197-132(230)93(187-140(106)238)27-14-18-52-160)143(241)193-103(60-83-37-45-87(211)46-38-83)151(249)206-57-23-32-112(206)146(244)194-104(152(250)251)61-84-39-47-88(212)48-40-84)141(239)186-91(25-12-16-50-158)128(226)182-94(29-20-54-173-154(166)167)129(227)181-89(28-19-53-172-153(164)165)125(223)176-67-116(216)180-97(58-81-33-41-85(209)42-34-81)135(233)184-95(30-21-55-174-155(168)169)131(229)195-105(68-207)126(224)177-66-115(215)179-90(24-11-15-49-157)127(225)198-110(145(243)204-121)73-256-257-74-111(200-148(246)119(75(2)3)202-123(221)78(7)161)144(242)203-120(76(4)5)147(245)191-98(59-82-35-43-86(210)44-36-82)136(234)185-96(31-22-56-175-156(170)171)133(231)205-122(80(9)208)150(248)201-109/h33-48,75-80,89-112,119-122,207-212H,10-32,49-74,157-161H2,1-9H3,(H2,162,213)(H2,163,214)(H,176,223)(H,177,224)(H,178,232)(H,179,215)(H,180,216)(H,181,227)(H,182,226)(H,183,236)(H,184,233)(H,185,234)(H,186,239)(H,187,238)(H,188,235)(H,189,228)(H,190,240)(H,191,245)(H,192,247)(H,193,241)(H,194,244)(H,195,229)(H,196,222)(H,197,230)(H,198,225)(H,199,237)(H,200,246)(H,201,248)(H,202,221)(H,203,242)(H,204,243)(H,205,231)(H,217,218)(H,219,220)(H,250,251)(H4,164,165,172)(H4,166,167,173)(H4,168,169,174)(H4,170,171,175)/t77-,78-,79-,80+,89-,90-,91-,92-,93-,94-,95-,96-,97-,98-,99-,100-,101-,102-,103-,104-,105-,106-,107-,108-,109-,110-,111-,112-,119-,120-,121-,122-/m0/s1 Key: DRESBDFQIAWCSE-LCNKDFMLSA-N
- SMILES: N[C@@H](C)C(=O)N[C@@H](C(C)C)C(=O)N[C@@H](CS3)C(=O)N[C@@H](C(C)C)C(=O)N[C@@H](Cc1ccc(O)cc1)C(=O)N[C@@H](CCCNC(=N)N)C(=O)N[C@@H]([C@]([H])(O)C)C(=O)N[C@@H](CS4)C(=O)N[C@@H](CC(=O)O)C(=O)N[C@@H](CCCCN)C(=O)N[C@@H](CC(=O)O)C(=O)N[C@@H](CS5)C(=O)N[C@@H](CCCCN)C(=O)N[C@@H](CCCNC(=N)N)C(=O)N[C@@H](CCCNC(=N)N)C(=O)NCC(=O)N[C@@H](Cc1ccc(O)cc1)C(=O)N[C@@H](CCCNC(=N)N)C(=O)N[C@@H](CO)C(=O)NCC(=O)N[C@@H](CCCCN)C(=O)N[C@@H](CS3)C(=O)N[C@@H]([C@]([H])(CC)C)C(=O)N[C@@H](CC(=O)N)C(=O)N[C@@H](CC(=O)N)C(=O)N[C@@H](C)C(=O)N[C@@H](CS4)C(=O)N[C@@H](CCCCN)C(=O)N[C@@H](CS5)C(=O)N[C@@H](Cc1ccc(O)cc1)C(=O)N1[C@@H](CCC1)C(=O)N[C@@H](Cc1ccc(O)cc1)C(=O)O

Properties
Chemical formula	C_{156}H_{245}N_{51}O_{44}S_{6}
Molar mass	3731.35 g·mol^{−1}
- Except where otherwise noted, data are given for materials in their standard state (at 25 °C [77 °F], 100 kPa). Infobox references

Cobatoxin is a toxin present in the venom of the scorpion Centruroides noxius. It blocks two potassium channel subtypes; voltage-gated and calcium-activated channels.

== Etymology ==
The toxin is named after Coba (Spanish: Cobá) an ancient Maya city on the Yucatán Peninsula, located in the Mexican state of Quintana Roo.

== Sources ==
Cobatoxin 1 and 2 are both found in the venom of the Centruroides noxius scorpion.

== Chemistry ==
=== Structure ===
Cobatoxin is a 32-residue toxin (sequence AVCVYRTCDKDCKRRGYRSGKCINNACKCYPY-NH2) with 3 disulfide bridges, which are located on C1-C4, C2-C5 and C3- C6 (Cys3-Cys22, Cys8-Cys27, and Cys12-Cys29). The peptide backbone is folded according to an α/β scaffold, both α-helical and two-stranded β-sheet structures are present. Cobatoxin 1 has a rod-like shape due to an extended N-terminus.

=== Family ===
Cobatoxin 1 and 2 both belong to the α-KTx family. The α-KTx family is part of the K+-channel-specific scorpion toxins (KTx), which consists of 3 families; α, β, and γ. These 3 families differ in structure.

== Target ==
Cobatoxin 1 and 2 both block the Kv1.1 K+-channels in mice and the Shaker B K+ channels in insects, which are voltage-dependent K+-channels (Selisko, 1998). Other voltage-dependent K+-channels that are blocked by Cobatoxin 1 are the Kv1.2 K+-channels in rats and Kv1.3 K+-channels in mice. Cobatoxin 1 also blocks the IKCa1 Ca2+-activated K+-channel.

== Mode of action ==
Cobatoxin 1 is a pore-blocking toxin. The interaction between cobatoxin 1 and the Kv1.2 channel is first esthablished by four salt bridges, which are formed between side chains of the four Kv1.2 α-subunits and amino acids residues of cobatoxin 1. This way a stable complex is formed, named the toxin-ring. Next, a tighter interaction is formed by a hydrophobic interaction between cobatoxin 1 and the α-subunit. Then the Lys21 side chain of cobatoxin 1 blocks the pore by entering the P-domain of the ion channel, which is the selectivity filter.

== Toxicity ==
The LD_{50} of cobatoxin 1 after intracerebroventricular injection in mice is 500±45 ng.
