= Α-Neoendorphin =

α-Neoendorphin

Names
- Other names Alpha-Neoendorphin

Identifiers
CAS Number	69671-17-6
3D model (JSmol)	Interactive image
ChEBI	CHEBI:80261
ChEMBL	ChEMBL2409222
ChemSpider	4470544
IUPHAR/BPS	1600
KEGG	C16039
PubChem CID	5311003
CompTox Dashboard (EPA)	DTXSID701029640
- InChI: InChI=1S/C60H89N15O13/c1-36(2)30-46(73-56(84)47(32-37-12-4-3-5-13-37)69-51(79)35-67-50(78)34-68-52(80)42(63)31-38-18-22-40(76)23-19-38)55(83)71-44(16-10-28-66-60(64)65)53(81)70-43(14-6-8-26-61)54(82)74-48(33-39-20-24-41(77)25-21-39)58(86)75-29-11-17-49(75)57(85)72-45(59(87)88)15-7-9-27-62/h3-5,12-13,18-25,36,42-49,76-77H,6-11,14-17,26-35,61-63H2,1-2H3,(H,67,78)(H,68,80)(H,69,79)(H,70,81)(H,71,83)(H,72,85)(H,73,84)(H,74,82)(H,87,88)(H4,64,65,66)/t42-,43-,44-,45-,46-,47-,48-,49-/m0/s1 Key: KZTDMJBCZSGHOG-XJIZABAQSA-N
- SMILES: N[C@@H](CC1=CC=C(O)C=C1)C(NCC(NCC(N[C@@H](CC2=CC=CC=C2)C(N[C@@H](CC(C)C)C(N[C@@H](CCCNC(N)=N)C(N[C@@H](CCCCN)C(N[C@@H](CC3=CC=C(O)C=C3)C(N4CCC[C@H]4C(N[C@H](C(O)=O)CCCCN)=O)=O)=O)=O)=O)=O)=O)=O)=O

Properties
Chemical formula	C_{60}H_{89}N_{15}O_{13}
Molar mass	1228.464 g·mol^{−1}
- Except where otherwise noted, data are given for materials in their standard state (at 25 °C [77 °F], 100 kPa). Infobox references

α-Neoendorphin is an endogenous opioid peptide with a decapeptide structure and the amino acid sequence Tyr-Gly-Gly-Phe-Leu-Arg-Lys-Tyr-Pro-Lys. It's one of the two neoendorphins.

α-Neoendorphin is a neuropeptide. Prodynorphin is its precursor protein. Researchers and anatomists have not yet studied the distribution of α-neoendorphin in the human in detail. However, some studies have been done which supports the presence of α-neoendorphin immunoreactive fibers throughout the human brainstem. According to a study done by Duque, Ewing, Arturo Mangas, Pablo Salinas, Zaida Díaz-cabiale, José Narváez, and Rafael Coveñas; α-neoendorphin immunoreactive fibers can be found in the caudal part of the solitary nucleus, in the caudal and the gelatinosa parts of the spinal trigeminal nucleus, and only low density was found in the central grey matter of medulla.

== See also ==
- β-Neoendorphin
- Neoendorphin
- Endorphin
