= Siamenoside I =

- Chemical structure of siamenoside I

Identifiers
CAS Number	126105-12-2
3D model (JSmol)	Interactive image
ChemSpider	24534173
PubChem CID	71307460
UNII	L34LUJ2UPB
- InChI: InChI=1S/C54H92O24/c1-22(23-15-16-52(6)30-12-10-24-25(54(30,8)31(58)17-53(23,52)7)11-14-32(50(24,2)3)76-47-43(68)39(64)35(60)27(19-56)73-47)9-13-33(51(4,5)70)77-49-45(78-48-44(69)40(65)36(61)28(20-57)74-48)41(66)37(62)29(75-49)21-71-46-42(67)38(63)34(59)26(18-55)72-46/h10,22-23,25-49,55-70H,9,11-21H2,1-8H3/t22-,23-,25-,26-,27-,28-,29-,30-,31-,32+,33-,34-,35-,36-,37-,38+,39+,40+,41+,42-,43-,44-,45-,46-,47+,48+,49+,52+,53-,54+/m1/s1 Key: XJIPREFALCDWRQ-KGFBLRRZSA-N
- SMILES: C[C@H](CC[C@H](C(C)(C)O)O[C@H]1[C@@H]([C@H]([C@@H]([C@H](O1)CO[C@H]2[C@@H]([C@H]([C@@H]([C@H](O2)CO)O)O)O)O)O)O[C@H]3[C@@H]([C@H]([C@@H]([C@H](O3)CO)O)O)O)[C@H]4CC[C@@]5([C@@]4(C[C@H]([C@@]6([C@@H]5CC=C7[C@H]6CC[C@@H](C7(C)C)O[C@H]8[C@@H]([C@H]([C@@H]([C@H](O8)CO)O)O)O)C)O)C)C

Properties
Chemical formula	C_{54}H_{92}O_{24}
Molar mass	1125.29 g/mol
Appearance	white powder
- Except where otherwise noted, data are given for materials in their standard state (at 25 °C [77 °F], 100 kPa). verify (what is ?) Infobox references

Siamenoside is a cucurbitane, a natural sweetener from the fruit of Siraitia grosvenorii combined with neomogroside. The mixture is about 300 times sweeter than sucrose. It is used as a natural sweetener in China.

== See also ==
- Mogroside, related compounds also found in S. grosvenorii.
