= 1-α-O-Galloylpunicalagin =

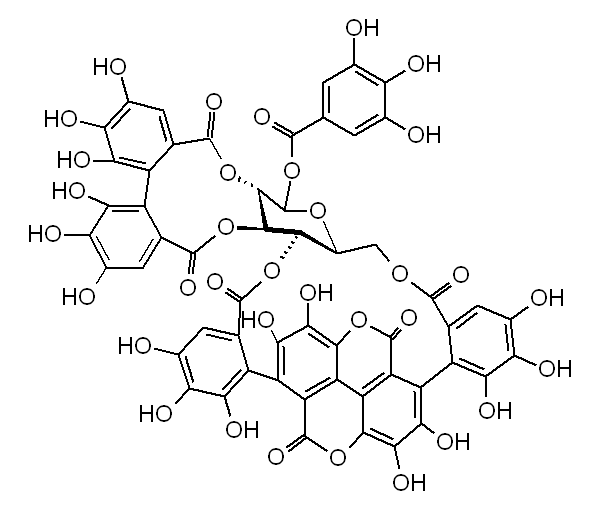
- Chemical structure of 1-α-O-galloylpunicalagin

Names
- Other names Combreglutinin; Teroblongin

Identifiers
CAS Number	108906-54-3
3D model (JSmol)	Interactive image
ChemSpider	129561793
PubChem CID	165363817
CompTox Dashboard (EPA)	DTXSID801030292
- InChI: InChI=1S/C55H32O34/c56-13-1-8(2-14(57)30(13)62)48(75)89-55-47-46(87-51(78)10-4-16(59)31(63)35(67)20(10)21-11(52(79)88-47)5-17(60)32(64)36(21)68)43-19(83-55)7-82-49(76)9-3-15(58)33(65)37(69)22(9)24-28-26-27-29(54(81)86-44(26)41(73)39(24)71)25(40(72)42(74)45(27)85-53(28)80)23-12(50(77)84-43)6-18(61)34(66)38(23)70/h1-6,19,43,46-47,55-74H,7H2/t19?,43-,46-,47+,55?/m1/s1 Key: PMOWTIMRSISLEU-NTBKRYJNSA-N
- SMILES: C1C2[C@H]([C@@H]3[C@@H](C(O2)OC(=O)C4=CC(=C(C(=C4)O)O)O)OC(=O)C5=CC(=C(C(=C5C6=C(C(=C(C=C6C(=O)O3)O)O)O)O)O)O)OC(=O)C7=CC(=C(C(=C7C8=C(C(=C9C2=C8C(=O)OC3=C(C(=C(C4=C(C(=C(C=C4C(=O)O1)O)O)O)C(=C23)C(=O)O9)O)O)O)O)O)O)O

Properties
Chemical formula	C_{55}H_{32}O_{34}
Molar mass	1236.827 g·mol^{−1}
- Except where otherwise noted, data are given for materials in their standard state (at 25 °C [77 °F], 100 kPa). verify (what is ?) Infobox references

1-α-O-Galloylpunicalagin is an ester of gallic acid and punicalagin, a type of ellagitannin. It is found in the pomegranate (Punica granatum) and in Combretum glutinosum.

A study in Taiwan showed that 1-α-O-galloylpunicalagin induced nitric oxide production in a dose-dependent manner in endothelial cells via the PI3K/AKT/mTOR pathway.
