= Endopeptidase inhibitor =

Type of drug

An endopeptidase inhibitor is a drug that inhibits one or more endopeptidase enzymes. Endopeptidases are one of two types of proteases (enzymes that break down proteins and peptides), the other being exopeptidases. Endopeptidases cleave peptide bonds of non-terminal amino acids (that is, they cut proteins/peptides into two chains), whereas exopeptidases break terminal bonds, resulting in the release of a single amino acid or dipeptide from the peptide chain.

== Examples of endopeptidase inhibitors ==
Some examples of endopeptidase inhibitors include the following:

- Neprilysin inhibitors
  - Selective neprilysin inhibitors
    - Candoxatril - prodrug to candoxatrilat
    - Candoxatrilat - active metabolite of candoxatril
    - Dexecadotril (retorphan) - (R)-enantiomer of racecadotril; prodrug to (R)-thiorphan
    - Ecadotril (sinorphan) - (S)-enantiomer of racecadotril; prodrug to (S)-thiorphan
    - Racecadotril (acetorphan) - racemic form of dexecadotril and ecadotril; prodrug to thiorphan
    - Sacubitril - prodrug to sacubitrilat
    - Sacubitrilat - active metabolite of sacubitril
    - Thiorphan - active metabolite of racecadotril
    - UK-414,495
  - Non-selective neprilysin inhibitors
    - Aladotril - also inhibits angiotensin converting enzyme (ACE) (an exopeptidase)
    - Alatriopril - also inhibits ACE
    - Daglutril - also inhibits endothelin converting enzyme (ECE) (an exopeptidase)
    - Fasidotril - also inhibits ACE
    - Gemopatrilat - also inhibits ACE
    - Ilepatril - also inhibits ACE
    - Ketalorphan - also inhibits APN, ACE, and dipeptidyl-peptidase 3 (DPP-3) (an exopeptidase)
    - Omapatrilat - also inhibits ACE
    - Phosphoramidon - inhibitor of neprilysin and thermolysin; also inhibits ECE
    - RB-101 - also inhibits aminopeptidase N (APN) (an exopeptidase)
    - Sampatrilat
    - Spinorphan - also inhibits APN, ACE, and DPP-3
    - Tynorphin - also inhibits APN, ACE, and DPP-3
- Trypsin inhibitors/others
  - Aloxistatin - inhibitor of cysteine proteases
  - Benzamidine – inhibitor of serine
  - Camostat - inhibitor of trypsin and various other proteases
  - Ecallantide - kallikrein inhibitor
  - Leupeptin - non-selective inhibitor of cysteine, serine, and threonine proteases
  - Nafamostat - inhibitor of trypsin, tryptase, and various other serine proteases
  - Pacifastins - trypsin and chymotrypsin inhibitor
  - Patamostat - trypsin inhibitor
  - Pepstatin - inhibitor of renin and various aspartyl proteases
  - Sepimostat - inhibitor of serine proteases
  - Sivelestat - inhibitor of neutrophil elastase
  - Talopeptin - inhibitor of thermolysin and other metalloproteases
  - Ulinastatin - inhibitor of trypsin and various other proteases
  - Upamostat - serine protease inhibitor
- Renin inhibitors
  - Aliskiren
  - Ciprokiren
  - Ditekiren
  - Enalkiren
  - Pepstatin
  - Remikiren
  - Terlakiren
  - Zankiren

== See also ==
- Exopeptidase inhibitor
- Enkephalinase inhibitor
