= Exopeptidase inhibitor =

An exopeptidase inhibitor is a drug that inhibits one or more exopeptidase enzymes. Exopeptidases are one of two types of proteases (enzymes that break down proteins and peptides), the other being endopeptidases. Exopeptidases cleave peptide bonds of terminal amino acids, resulting in the release of a single amino acid or dipeptide from the peptide chain, whereas endopeptidases break non-terminal bonds (that is, they cut proteins/peptides into two chains).

Some examples of exopeptidase inhibitors include amastatin, bestatin (ubenimex), puromycin, 1,10-phenanthroline, D-phenylalanine, ACE inhibitors, DPP-4 inhibitors, and exogenous MMP inhibitors like batimastat and marimastat. Various enkephalinase inhibitors, such as ketalorphan, spinorphin, and tynorphin, are mainly exopeptidase inhibitors.

== See also ==
- Endopeptidase inhibitor
