= Opiorphin =

Endogenous chemical compound first isolated from human saliva

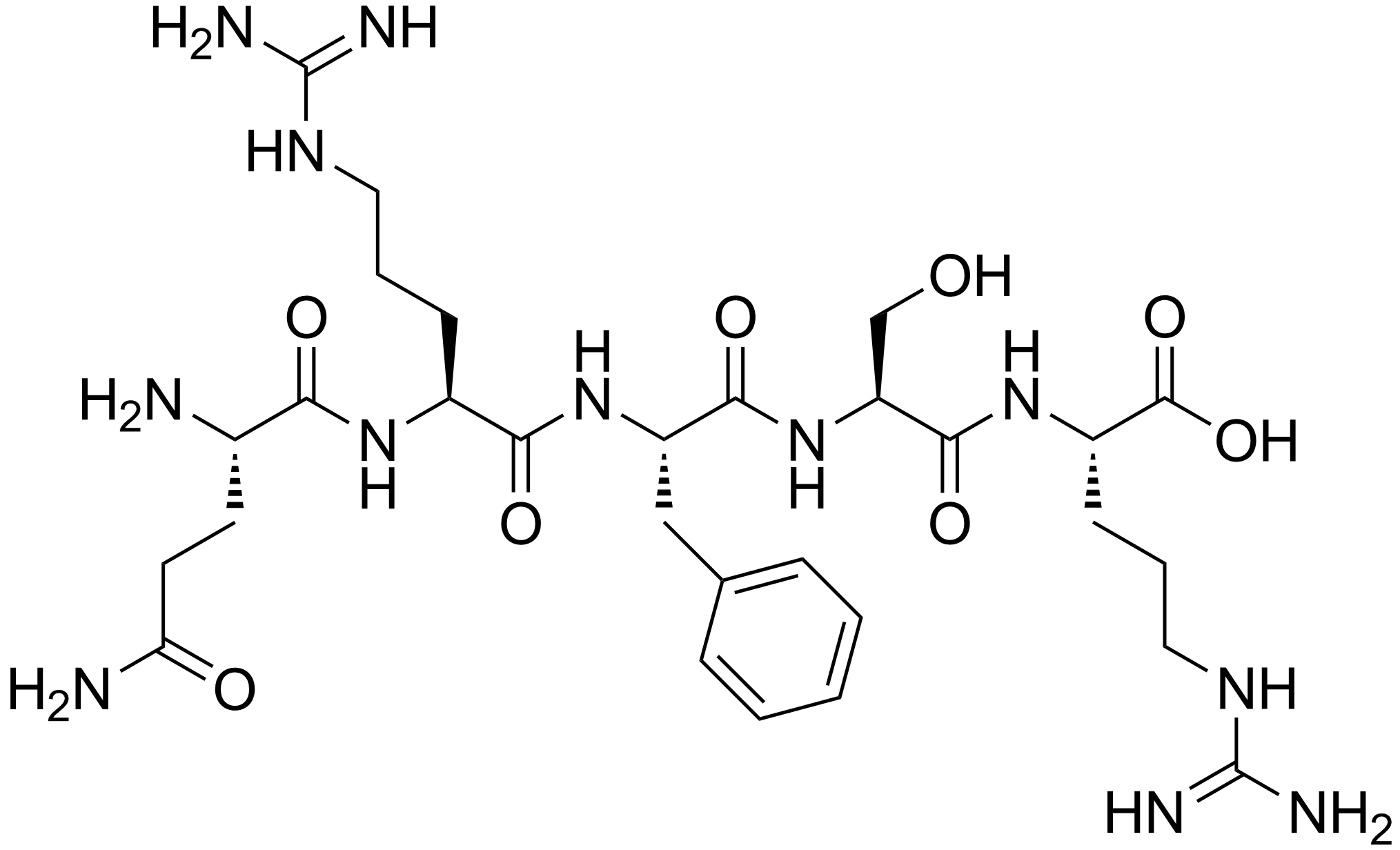

Names
- IUPAC name (2S,5S,8S,11S,14S)-14,17-diamino-8-benzyl-2,11-bis(3-guanidinopropyl)-5-(hydroxymethyl)-4,7,10,13,17-pentaoxo-3,6,9,12-tetraazaheptadecan-1-oic acid
- Other names Gln-Arg-Phe-Ser-Arg; L-Glutaminyl-L-arginyl-L-phenylalanyl-L-seryl-L-arginine

Identifiers
CAS Number	864084-88-8
3D model (JSmol)	Interactive image
ChEMBL	ChEMBL2022225
ChemSpider	28296048
PubChem CID	25195667
UNII	B73XKF7SAQ
CompTox Dashboard (EPA)	DTXSID901027119
- InChI: InChI=1S/C29H48N12O8/c30-17(10-11-22(31)43)23(44)38-18(8-4-12-36-28(32)33)24(45)40-20(14-16-6-2-1-3-7-16)25(46)41-21(15-42)26(47)39-19(27(48)49)9-5-13-37-29(34)35/h1-3,6-7,17-21,42H,4-5,8-15,30H2,(H2,31,43)(H,38,44)(H,39,47)(H,40,45)(H,41,46)(H,48,49)(H4,32,33,36)(H4,34,35,37)/t17-,18-,19-,20-,21-/m0/s1 Key: TWWFCOBVAKAKIT-SXYSDOLCSA-N; InChI=1/C29H48N12O8/c30-17(10-11-22(31)43)23(44)38-18(8-4-12-36-28(32)33)24(45)40-20(14-16-6-2-1-3-7-16)25(46)41-21(15-42)26(47)39-19(27(48)49)9-5-13-37-29(34)35/h1-3,6-7,17-21,42H,4-5,8-15,30H2,(H2,31,43)(H,38,44)(H,39,47)(H,40,45)(H,41,46)(H,48,49)(H4,32,33,36)(H4,34,35,37)/t17-,18-,19-,20-,21-/m0/s1 Key: TWWFCOBVAKAKIT-SXYSDOLCBM
- SMILES: O=C([C@H](CO)NC([C@H](CC1=CC=CC=C1)NC([C@H](CCCNC(N)=N)NC([C@H](CCC(N)=O)N)=O)=O)=O)N[C@H](C(O)=O)CCCNC(N)=N

Properties
Chemical formula	C_{29}H_{48}N_{12}O_{8}
Molar mass	692.779 g·mol^{−1}
- Except where otherwise noted, data are given for materials in their standard state (at 25 °C [77 °F], 100 kPa). verify (what is ?) Infobox references

Opiorphin is an endogenous chemical compound first isolated from human saliva. Initial research with mice shows the compound has a painkilling effect greater than that of morphine. It works by stopping the normal breakup of enkephalins, natural pain-killing opioids in the spinal cord. It is a relatively simple molecule consisting of a five-amino acid polypeptide, Gln-Arg-Phe-Ser-Arg (QRFSR).

Opiorphin pentapeptide originates from the N-terminal region of the protein PROL1 (proline-rich, lacrimal 1). Opiorphin inhibits three proteases: neutral ecto-endopeptidase (MME), ecto-aminopeptidase N (ANPEP) and perhaps also a dipeptidyl peptidase DPP3. Such action extends the duration of enkephalin effect where the natural pain killers are released physiologically in response to specific potentially painful stimuli, in contrast with administration of narcotics, which floods the entire body and causes many undesirable adverse reactions, including addiction liability and constipation. In addition, opiorphin may exert anti-depressive and antipanic action.

Therapeutic application of opiorphin in humans would require modifying the molecule to avoid its rapid degradation in the intestine and its poor penetration of the blood–brain barrier. This modification is done in the body by transformation of N-terminal glutamine into pyroglutamate. This form preserves the analgesic properties of opiorphin but with increased pharmaceutical stability.

== See also ==
- RB-101
- Racecadotril
