= Tynorphin =

Synthetic opioid chemical compound

Clinical data
- ATC code: None

Legal status
- Legal status: In general: non-regulated

Identifiers
- IUPAC name: (2S)-2-[[(2S)-1-[(2S)-2-[[(2S)-2-[[(2S)-2-amino-3-methylbutanoyl]amino]-3-methylbutanoyl]amino]-3-(4-hydroxyphenyl)propanoyl]pyrrolidine-2-carbonyl]amino]-3-(1H-indol-3-yl)propanoic acid
- CAS Number: 145196-50-5
- PubChem CID: 9961318
- ChemSpider: 8136925

Chemical and physical data
- Formula: C_{35}H_{46}N_{6}O_{7}
- Molar mass: 662.788 g·mol^{−1}
- 3D model (JSmol): Interactive image; Interactive image
- SMILES: CC(C)[C@@H](C(=O)N[C@@H](C(C)C)C(=O)N[C@@H](CC1=CC=C(C=C1)O)C(=O)N2CCC[C@H]2C(=O)N[C@@H](CC3=CNC4=CC=CC=C43)C(=O)O)N; O=C(N[C@H](C(=O)N[C@H](C(=O)N1CCC[C@H]1C(=O)N[C@H](C(=O)O)Cc3c2ccccc2[nH]c3)Cc4ccc(O)cc4)C(C)C)[C@@H](N)C(C)C
- InChI: InChI=1S/C35H46N6O7/c1-19(2)29(36)32(44)40-30(20(3)4)33(45)38-26(16-21-11-13-23(42)14-12-21)34(46)41-15-7-10-28(41)31(43)39-27(35(47)48)17-22-18-37-25-9-6-5-8-24(22)25/h5-6,8-9,11-14,18-20,26-30,37,42H,7,10,15-17,36H2,1-4H3,(H,38,45)(H,39,43)(H,40,44)(H,47,48)/t26-,27-,28-,29-,30-/m0/s1; Key:WLWBANYDSJWZBI-IIZANFQQSA-N

Tynorphin is a synthetic opioid peptide which is a potent and competitive inhibitor of the enkephalinase class of enzymes which break down the endogenous enkephalin peptides. It specifically inactivates dipeptidyl aminopeptidase III (DPP3) with very high efficacy, but also inhibits neutral endopeptidase (NEP), aminopeptidase N (APN), and angiotensin-converting enzyme (ACE) to a lesser extent. It has a pentapeptide structure with the amino acid sequence Val-Val-Tyr-Pro-Trp (VVYPW).

Tynorphin was discovered in an attempt to develop an enkephalinase inhibitor of greater potency than spinorphin.

== See also ==
- Enkephalinase inhibitor
