= RB-3007 =

Names
- IUPAC name Benzyl N-{(2S)-2-[([2-(acetylsulfanyl)ethoxy]{[(R)-amino(phenyl)methyl]phosphonoyl})methyl]-3-([1,1′-biphenyl]-4-yl)propanoyl}-L-alaninate
- Systematic IUPAC name Benzyl (9S,12S)-7-[(R)-amino(phenyl)methyl]-9-[([1,1′-biphenyl]-4-yl)methyl]-12-methyl-2,7,10-trioxo-6-oxa-3-thia-11-aza-7λ^{5}-phosphatridecan-13-oate
- Other names RB3007, LS-15768

Identifiers
| 3D model (JSmol) | Interactive image |
| ChemSpider | 9247929 |
| PubChem CID | 11072779 |
| CompTox Dashboard (EPA) | DTXSID301336316 |
- InChI: InChI=1S/C37H41N2O6PS/c1-27(37(42)44-25-30-12-6-3-7-13-30)39-36(41)34(24-29-18-20-32(21-19-29)31-14-8-4-9-15-31)26-46(43,45-22-23-47-28(2)40)35(38)33-16-10-5-11-17-33/h3-21,27,34-35H,22-26,38H2,1-2H3,(H,39,41)/t27-,34+,35+,46?/m0/s1 Key: PYJMLILRVYLUHW-UNCDKACKSA-N
- SMILES: C[C@H](NC(=O)[C@H](CC1=CC=C(C=C1)C1=CC=CC=C1)CP(=O)(OCCSC(C)=O)[C@@H](N)C1=CC=CC=C1)C(=O)OCC1=CC=CC=C1

Properties
| Chemical formula | C_{37}H_{41}N_{2}O_{6}PS |
| Molar mass | 672.78 g·mol^{−1} |
- Except where otherwise noted, data are given for materials in their standard state (at 25 °C [77 °F], 100 kPa). Infobox references

RB-3007 is an orally active analogue of RB-101. It acts as an enkephalinase inhibitor, which is used in scientific research.

== See also ==
- RB-101 - enkephalinase inhibitor that produces analgesia without respiratory depression
- D/DL-Phenylalanine - D-phenylalanine blockage of enkephalin degradation may be responsible for the reputed analgesic effect of DL-Phenylalanine
- Racecadotril - an antidiarrheal drug which acts as a peripheral enkephalinase inhibitor
- Ecadotril - a neutral endopeptidase inhibitor
