= Kelatorphan =

Chemical compound

Clinical data
- ATC code: None

Legal status
- Legal status: In general: non-regulated

Identifiers
- IUPAC name: N-[(2R)-2-benzyl-4-(hydroxyamino)-4-oxobutanoyl]-L-alanine
- CAS Number: 92175-57-0
- PubChem CID: 123982
- DrugBank: DB08040
- ChemSpider: 110501
- UNII: 46BBW2U5D6
- CompTox Dashboard (EPA): DTXSID90238911

Chemical and physical data
- Formula: C_{14}H_{18}N_{2}O_{5}
- Molar mass: 294.307 g·mol^{−1}
- 3D model (JSmol): Interactive image
- SMILES: O=C(O)[C@@H](NC(=O)[C@H](Cc1ccccc1)CC(=O)NO)C
- InChI: InChI=1S/C14H18N2O5/c1-9(14(19)20)15-13(18)11(8-12(17)16-21)7-10-5-3-2-4-6-10/h2-6,9,11,21H,7-8H2,1H3,(H,15,18)(H,16,17)(H,19,20)/t9-,11+/m0/s1; Key:OJCFZTVYDSKXNM-GXSJLCMTSA-N

Kelatorphan is a drug which acts as a powerful and complete inhibitor of nearly all of the enzymes responsible for catabolism of the endogenous enkephalins, including neutral endopeptidase (NEP), dipeptidyl peptidase III (DPP3), aminopeptidase N (APN), and angiotensin-converting enzyme (ACE). In mice, with the intracerebroventricular co-administration of a 50 μg dose of kelatorphan (this route is necessary because kelatorphan is incapable of crossing the blood-brain-barrier) hence alongside exogenous [Met]enkephalin (ED_{50} approximately 10 ng), it potentiated the analgesic effects of the latter by 50,000 times. Kelatorphan also displays potent antinociceptive effects alone, and does not depress respiration, although at high doses it actually increases it.

== See also ==
- Enkephalinase inhibitor
