= Dipeptidyl aminopeptidase III =

Dipeptidyl aminopeptidase III may refer to:

- Dipeptidyl-peptidase III, an enzyme
- DPP3, a gene
