= Candoxatril =

Names
- Preferred IUPAC name (1R,4s)-4-(1-{(2S)-3-[(2,3-Dihydro-1H-inden-5-yl)oxy]-2-[(2-methoxyethoxy)methyl]-3-oxopropyl}cyclopentan-1-amido)cyclohexane-1-carboxylic acid

Identifiers
CAS Number	123122-55-4
3D model (JSmol)	Interactive image
ChEMBL	ChEMBL35084
ChemSpider	16736409
DrugBank	DB00616
MeSH	candoxatril
PubChem CID	122116; 5362417
UNII	ACP75508EE
CompTox Dashboard (EPA)	DTXSID6047286
- InChI: InChI=1S/C29H41NO7/c1-35-15-16-36-19-23(27(33)37-25-12-9-20-5-4-6-22(20)17-25)18-29(13-2-3-14-29)28(34)30-24-10-7-21(8-11-24)26(31)32/h9,12,17,21,23-24H,2-8,10-11,13-16,18-19H2,1H3,(H,30,34)(H,31,32)
- SMILES: O=C(NC1CCC(C(=O)O)CC1)C4(CC(C(=O)Oc2cc3c(cc2)CCC3)COCCOC)CCCC4

Properties
Chemical formula	C_{29}H_{41}NO_{7}
Molar mass	515.647 g·mol^{−1}
- Except where otherwise noted, data are given for materials in their standard state (at 25 °C [77 °F], 100 kPa). Infobox references

Candoxatril is the orally active prodrug of candoxatrilat (UK-73967).

== Human neutral endopeptidase ==
Human neutral endopeptidase (neprilysin) as the neutral endopeptidase 24.11 complexed (RB-101) with phosphoramidon degrades and inactivates a number of bioactive peptides. Two multiply connected folding domains of the neutral endopeptidase locus splicing of exons 1, 2a, or 2b to the common exon 3 composed of 24 exons of the human CALLA/NEP gene containing the active site, it is known as peptidase family M13 (neprilysin family, clan MA(E)) the gluzincins a faint but significant structural relationship of the metzincins to the thermolysin-like enzymes, Zincin is the simplest descriptor of biological space. The structure reveals two multiply connected folding domains which embrace a large central cavity containing the active site of the 5-indanyl ester prodrug candoxatril and differs from phosphoramidon [N-(N-(((6-Deoxy-α-L-mannopyranosyl)oxy)hydroxyphosphinyl)-L- leucyl)-L-tryptophan] in several respects the structure of human neutral endopeptidase complexed with phosphoramidon is lost due to desolvation of the enzyme and ligand on formation of the complex candoxatril.

== Studies ==
Candoxatril is the first drug of its kind to be released for clinical trials regarding heart failure. This is because candoxatril produces favorable haemodynamic effects in patients with chronic heart failure. It has been demonstrated that candoxatril is associated with a beneficial hemodynamic effect that is useful both in rest and exercise. In several different studies, candoxatril has been shown to improve performance in people with heart failure. In one study, 12 different patients were selected, all with moderately severe heart failure. On day one of this study, the candoxatril had increased plasma ANP levels, suppressed aldosterone and decreased right atrial and pulmonary capillary wedge pressures. After treatment for 10 days, patients health had improved with an increase of basal ANP and a decrease of aldosterone, along with a reduced body weight that could be a reflection of chronic natriuretic, diuretic effects, or both. It was decided that on day 10 of the study, the effects of candoxatril were similar to that on day one.

In a separate study, patients were gathered throughout the United Kingdom from 16 different centers. Over a four-week bind, the patients were either given candoxatril or placebo for the 84 days and every 28 days, patients were reassessed. Out of the 110 patients, 56 received candoxatril and 54 received the placebo. Over the time of the study, the patients who were taking candoxatril had an overall improvement in exercise time compared to the patients taking the placebo.

In a third study, there was only one patient who experienced worsening heart failure during this particular study. However, the frequency was not statistically significantly different from another observed group that was on placebo. Together, the results of this study show the candoxatril offers a new, effective therapeutic in the treatment of people with mild heart failure. The beneficial effects may begin to improve the well-being of patients during everyday activities.

== See also ==
- Ecadotril
