= C21H23NO4S =

The molecular formula C_{21}H_{23}NO_{4}S (molar mass: 385.48 g/mol, exact mass: 385.1348 u) may refer to:

- Ecadotril
- Racecadotril, or acetorphan
