= Spinorphin =

Names
- IUPAC name L-leucyl-L-valyl-L-valyl-L-tyrosyl-L-prolyl-L-tryptophyl-L-threonine
- Other names LVVYPWT; LVV-hemorphin-4

Identifiers
CAS Number	137201-62-8
3D model (JSmol)	Interactive image
ChemSpider	2339355
IUPHAR/BPS	1026
PubChem CID	3081832
CompTox Dashboard (EPA)	DTXSID70160105
- InChI: InChI=1S/C45H64N8O10/c1-23(2)19-31(46)39(56)50-37(25(5)6)43(60)51-36(24(3)4)42(59)49-34(20-27-14-16-29(55)17-15-27)44(61)53-18-10-13-35(53)41(58)48-33(40(57)52-38(26(7)54)45(62)63)21-28-22-47-32-12-9-8-11-30(28)32/h8-9,11-12,14-17,22-26,31,33-38,47,54-55H,10,13,18-21,46H2,1-7H3,(H,48,58)(H,49,59)(H,50,56)(H,51,60)(H,52,57)(H,62,63)/t26-,31+,33+,34+,35+,36+,37+,38+/m1/s1 Key: BXIFNVGZIMFBQB-DYDSHOKNSA-N; InChI=1/C45H64N8O10/c1-23(2)19-31(46)39(56)50-37(25(5)6)43(60)51-36(24(3)4)42(59)49-34(20-27-14-16-29(55)17-15-27)44(61)53-18-10-13-35(53)41(58)48-33(40(57)52-38(26(7)54)45(62)63)21-28-22-47-32-12-9-8-11-30(28)32/h8-9,11-12,14-17,22-26,31,33-38,47,54-55H,10,13,18-21,46H2,1-7H3,(H,48,58)(H,49,59)(H,50,56)(H,51,60)(H,52,57)(H,62,63)/t26-,31+,33+,34+,35+,36+,37+,38+/m1/s1 Key: BXIFNVGZIMFBQB-DYDSHOKNBN
- SMILES: O=C(N[C@H](C(=O)N[C@H](C(=O)N[C@H](C(=O)N1CCC[C@H]1C(=O)N[C@H](C(=O)N[C@H](C(=O)O)[C@H](O)C)Cc3c2ccccc2[nH]c3)Cc4ccc(O)cc4)C(C)C)C(C)C)[C@@H](N)CC(C)C

Properties
Chemical formula	C_{45}H_{64}N_{8}O_{10}
Molar mass	877.037 g/mol
- Except where otherwise noted, data are given for materials in their standard state (at 25 °C [77 °F], 100 kPa). Infobox references

Spinorphin is an endogenous, non-classical opioid peptide of the hemorphin family first isolated from the bovine spinal cord (hence the prefix spin-) and acts as a regulator of the enkephalinases, a class of enzymes that break down endogenous the enkephalin peptides. It does so by inhibiting the enzymes aminopeptidase N (APN), dipeptidyl peptidase III (DPP3), angiotensin-converting enzyme (ACE), and neutral endopeptidase (NEP). Spinorphin is a heptapeptide and has the amino acid sequence Leu-Val-Val-Tyr-Pro-Trp-Thr (LVVYPWT). It has been observed to possess antinociceptive, antiallodynic, and anti-inflammatory properties. The mechanism of action of spinorphin has not been fully elucidated (i.e., how it acts to inhibit the enkephalinases), but it has been found to act as an antagonist of the P2X_{3} receptor, and as a weak partial agonist/antagonist of the FP_{1} receptor.

== See also ==
- Enkephalinase inhibitor
