= C23H34N3O10P =

The molecular formula C_{23}H_{34}N_{3}O_{10}P (molar mass: 543.50 g/mol, exact mass: 543.1982 u) may refer to:

- Phosphoramidon
- Talopeptin
