= John Hughes (neuroscientist) =

British neuroscientist

- Born: 6 January 1942 (age 84)
- Education: King's College London
- Known for: Co-discovery of enkephalins
- Awards: Lasker award (1978); Fellow of the Royal Society (1993)
- Scientific career
- Fields: Neuroscience, Pharmacology
- Institutions: Yale School of Medicine; Aberdeen University; Imperial College London; University of Cambridge
- Patrons: Hans Kosterlitz
- Doctoral students: Fiona Marshall
- Website: www.wolfson.cam.ac.uk/people/professor-john-hughes

John Hughes (born 6 January 1942) is a British neuroscientist who shared the 1978 Albert Lasker Award for Basic Medical Research for the discovery of met-enkephalin and leu-enkephalin. This discovery demonstrated that opiate drugs exert their effects on the human brain by mimicking endogenous neurotransmitters, the opioid peptides.

== Education ==
Hughes was born and grew up in South London. He received BSc and PhD degrees from King's College London.

== Career and research ==
After his PhD, Hughes did postdoctoral research at Yale Medical School, where he studied the effects of angiotensin on the heart. He took a position as lecturer in Pharmacology at Aberdeen University, where he had a laboratory in Marischal College, and also collaborated in research with Hans Kosterlitz. He went on to become Reader in Pharmacological Biochemistry, and subsequently Professor, at Imperial College London. Later, he became Director of the Parke-Davis Neuroscience Centre at the University of Cambridge, where he is now an Emeritus Fellow of Wolfson College. He is also a Fellow of the Royal Society.

=== Discovery of enkephalins ===
While working with Kosterlitz at Aberdeen, Hughes helped discover the enkephalin peptides. Kosterlitz had developed assays for responses to opiate drugs, using pieces of guinea pig intestine and mouse vas deferens. Hughes sought to determine whether molecules present in brains could mimic the effects of the drugs. Reflecting in 1995 about that time, Hughes said: "From my personal point of view, I think that the reason I got interested in searching for an endogenous opioid-like substance is that I had been previously involved during my PhD student work in looking at non-adrenergic, noncholinergic innervation of various blood vessels and that's what my PhD thesis was eventually written on." He would bicycle daily to a slaughterhouse, where he would trade bottles of whiskey to the butchers in exchange for pig heads, and he subsequently prepared brain extracts using acetone. After testing many samples in Kosterlitz's assays, the two scientists were able to isolate and identify two peptides, met- and leu-enkephalin, as naturally occurring molecules from the brain, that have activity resembling opioids. Hughes and Kosterlitz first announced their findings at a scientific conference in May 1974, and published the structures of the two enkephalins in 1975. In 1978, they shared the Lasker award with Solomon H. Snyder, and Hughes in particular was credited with predicting the existence of endogenous opioids.
