= Bernard Roques =

French biochemist

Bernard Roques, born on 22 July 1935 in Reims, is a French researcher in biochemistry science, professor emeritus at the University of Paris Descartes, member of the French Academy of sciences.

Bernard Roques has devoted his research to the molecular-scale study of the phenomena of recognition of biological targets (e. g. DNA, peptidases, retroviral proteins, etc.) by endogenous (e. g. enkephalins, neuropeptides, etc.) or exogenous agents and their possible therapeutic extension. To this end, he has developed chemical tools and structural analysis techniques.
