= Met-enkephalin =

- Skeletal formula of Met-enkphalin

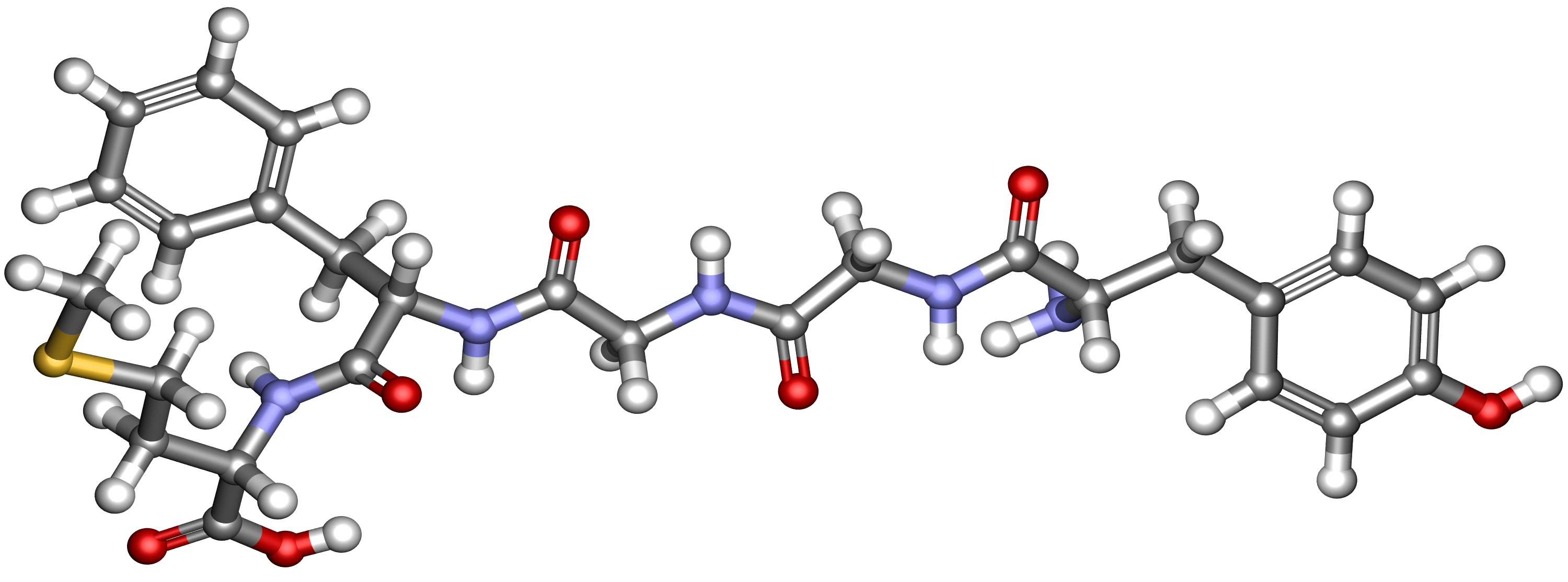

Names
- IUPAC name (2S)-2-[[(2S)-2-[[2-[[2-[[(2S)-2-amino-3-(4-hydroxyphenyl)propanoyl]amino]acetyl]amino]acetyl]amino]-3-phenylpropanoyl]amino]-4-methylsulfanylbutanoic acid
- Other names [Met]enkephalin; [Met^{5}]enkephalin; L-Tyrosylglycylglycyl-L-phenylalanyl-L-methionine

Identifiers
CAS Number	58569-55-4
3D model (JSmol)	Interactive image; Interactive image
ChEBI	CHEBI:6618
ChEMBL	ChEMBL13786
ChemSpider	391597
ECHA InfoCard	100.055.741
EC Number	261-335-8
IUPHAR/BPS	1614
KEGG	C11684
MeSH	Enkephalin,+Methionine
PubChem CID	443363
UNII	9JEZ9OD3AS
CompTox Dashboard (EPA)	DTXSID80332078
- InChI: InChI=1S/C27H35N5O7S/c1-40-12-11-21(27(38)39)32-26(37)22(14-17-5-3-2-4-6-17)31-24(35)16-29-23(34)15-30-25(36)20(28)13-18-7-9-19(33)10-8-18/h2-10,20-22,33H,11-16,28H2,1H3,(H,29,34)(H,30,36)(H,31,35)(H,32,37)(H,38,39) Key: YFGBQHOOROIVKG-UHFFFAOYSA-N
- SMILES: CSCCC(NC(=O)C(Cc1ccccc1)NC(=O)CNC(=O)CNC(=O)C(N)Cc1ccc(O)cc1)C(O)=O; CSCCC(NC(=O)C(CC1=CC=CC=C1)NC(=O)CNC(=O)CNC(=O)C(N)CC1=CC=C(O)C=C1)C(O)=O

Properties
Chemical formula	C_{27}H_{35}N_{5}O_{7}S
Molar mass	573.67 g·mol^{−1}
log P	0.607
Acidity (pK_{a})	3.234
Basicity (pK_{b})	10.763
- Except where otherwise noted, data are given for materials in their standard state (at 25 °C [77 °F], 100 kPa). verify (what is ?) Infobox references

Met-enkephalin, also known as metenkefalin (INN), sometimes referred to as opioid growth factor (OGF), is a naturally occurring, endogenous opioid peptide that has opioid effects of a relatively short duration. It is one of the two forms of enkephalin, the other being leu-enkephalin. The enkephalins are considered to be the primary endogenous ligands of the δ-opioid receptor, due to their high potency and selectivity for the site over the other endogenous opioids.

== History ==
Met-enkephalin was discovered and characterized by John Hughes, Hans Kosterlitz, et al. in 1975 after a search for endogenous ligands of the opioid receptors.

== Chemistry ==
Met-enkephalin is a pentapeptide with the amino acid sequence Tyr-Gly-Gly-Phe-Met. The tyrosine residue at position 1 is thought to be analogous to the 3-hydroxyl group on morphine.

== Biochemistry ==
=== Distribution ===
Met-enkephalin is found mainly in the adrenal medulla and throughout the central nervous system (CNS), including in the striatum, cerebral cortex, olfactory tubercle, hippocampus, septum, thalamus, and periaqueductal gray, as well as the dorsal horn of the spinal cord. It is also present in the periphery, notably in some primary afferent fibers that innervate the pelvic viscera.

=== Biosynthesis ===
Met-enkephalin is synthesized from proenkephalin via proteolytic cleavage in two metabolic steps. Proenkephalin A is first reduced by either one of two trypsin-like endopeptidase enzymes, proprotein convertase 1 (PC1) or prohormone convertase 2 (PC2); then, the resulting intermediates are further reduced by the enzyme carboxypeptidase E (CPE; previously known as enkephalin convertase (EC)). Proenkephalin A contains four sequences of met-enkephalin (at the following positions: 100–104; 107–111; 136–140; 210–214), and as a result, its cleavage generates four copies of met-enkephalin peptides at once. In addition, anabolism of proenkephalin A results in the production of one copy each of two C-terminal-extended met-enkephalin derivatives, the heptapeptide met-enkephalin-arg-phe (261–267), and the octapeptide met-enkephalin-arg-gly-leu (186–193), though whether they affect the opioid receptors in a similar manner as met-enkephalin is not entirely clear.

=== Clearance ===
Met- and leu-enkephalin are metabolized by a variety of different enzymes, including aminopeptidase N (APN), neutral endopeptidase (NEP), dipeptidyl peptidase 3 (DPP3), carboxypeptidase A6 (CPA6), and angiotensin-converting enzyme (ACE). These enzymes are sometimes referred to as enkephalinases.

=== Biological activity ===
Met-enkephalin is a potent agonist of the δ-opioid receptor, and to a lesser extent the μ-opioid receptor, with little to no effect on the κ-opioid receptor. It is through these receptors that met-enkephalin produces its opioid effects, such as analgesia and antidepressant-like effects.

It is also the endogenous ligand of the opioid growth factor receptor (OGFR; formerly known as the ζ-opioid receptor), which plays a role in the regulation of tissue growth and regeneration; hence why met-enkephalin is sometimes called OGF instead.

=== Pharmacokinetics ===
Met-enkephalin has low bioavailability, is rapidly metabolized, and has a very short half-life (minutes). These properties are considered undesirable in pharmaceuticals as large doses would need to be administered multiple times an hour to maintain a therapeutically relevant effect, making it unlikely that met-enkephalin will ever be used as a medicine.

[D-Ala2]-Met-enkephalinamide (DALA), is a synthetic enkephalin analog which is not susceptible to degradation by brain enzymes and at low doses (5 to 10 micrograms) caused profound, long-lasting, morphine-like analgesia when microinjected into a rat’s brain.

== See also ==
- Leu-enkephalin
- Enkephaline
- Enkephalinase
- Opioid peptide
