= Thermoase =

Thermoase may refer to:

- Subtilisin, an enzyme
- Thermolysin, an enzyme
