= Vibriolysin =

Identifiers
- EC no.: 3.4.24.25
- CAS no.: 69598-88-5

Databases
- IntEnz: IntEnz view
- BRENDA: BRENDA entry
- ExPASy: NiceZyme view
- KEGG: KEGG entry
- MetaCyc: metabolic pathway
- PRIAM: profile
- PDB structures: RCSB PDB PDBe PDBsum
Search
- PMC: articles
- PubMed: articles
- NCBI: proteins

Vibriolysin (EC 3.4.24.25, Aeromonas proteolytica neutral proteinase, aeromonolysin) is an enzyme. This enzyme catalyses the following chemical reaction

Preferential cleavage of bonds with bulky hydrophobic groups in P2 and P1'. Phe at P1' is the most favoured residue, which distinguished this enzyme from thermolysin

This thermostable enzyme is isolated from Vibrio proteolyticus.
