= C14H18N2O5 =

The molecular formula C_{14}H_{18}N_{2}O_{5} (molar mass: 294.303 g/mol, exact mass: 294.1216 u) may refer to:

- Aspartame
- Kelatorphan
