= Ecadotril =

Names
- Preferred IUPAC name Benzyl [(2S)-3-(acetylsulfanyl)-2-benzylpropanamido]acetate

Identifiers
CAS Number	112573-73-6
3D model (JSmol)	Interactive image
ChEMBL	ChEMBL1516410
ChemSpider	54591
PubChem CID	60561
UNII	6XSR933SRK
CompTox Dashboard (EPA)	DTXSID40861036 DTXSID8045513, DTXSID40861036
- InChI: InChI=1S/C21H23NO4S/c1-16(23)27-15-19(12-17-8-4-2-5-9-17)21(25)22-13-20(24)26-14-18-10-6-3-7-11-18/h2-11,19H,12-15H2,1H3,(H,22,25)/t19-/m1/s1 Key: ODUOJXZPIYUATO-LJQANCHMSA-N; InChI=1/C21H23NO4S/c1-16(23)27-15-19(12-17-8-4-2-5-9-17)21(25)22-13-20(24)26-14-18-10-6-3-7-11-18/h2-11,19H,12-15H2,1H3,(H,22,25)/t19-/m1/s1 Key: ODUOJXZPIYUATO-LJQANCHMBY
- SMILES: O=C(SC[C@H](C(=O)NCC(=O)OCc1ccccc1)Cc2ccccc2)C

Properties
Chemical formula	C_{21}H_{23}NO_{4}S
Molar mass	385.48 g·mol^{−1}
- Except where otherwise noted, data are given for materials in their standard state (at 25 °C [77 °F], 100 kPa). Infobox references

Ecadotril is a neutral endopeptidase inhibitor ((NEP) EC 3.4.24.11) and determined by the presence of peptidase family M13 as a neutral endopeptidase inhibited by phosphoramidon. Ecadotril is the (S)-enantiomer of racecadotril. NEP-like enzymes include the endothelin-converting enzymes. The peptidase M13 family believed to activate or inactivate oligopeptide (pro)-hormones such as opioid peptides, neprilysin is another member of this group, in the case of the metallopeptidases and aspartic, the nucleophiles clan or family for example MA, is an activated water molecule. The peptidase domain for members of this family also contains a bacterial member and resembles that of thermolysin the predicted active site residues for members of this family and thermolysin occur in the motif HEXXH. Thermolysin complexed with the inhibitor (S)-thiorphan are isomeric thiol-containing inhibitors of endopeptidase EC 24-11 (also called "enkephalinase").

== See also ==
- RB-101
- Candoxatril
