= Pseudolysin =

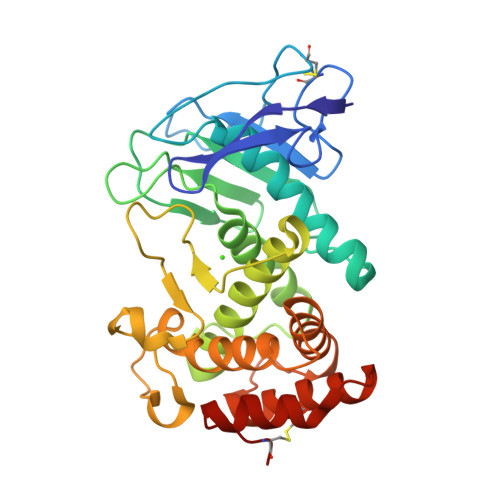

Identifiers
- EC no.: 3.4.24.26
- CAS no.: 171715-23-4

Databases
- IntEnz: IntEnz view
- BRENDA: BRENDA entry
- ExPASy: NiceZyme view
- KEGG: KEGG entry
- MetaCyc: metabolic pathway
- PRIAM: profile
- PDB structures: RCSB PDB PDBe PDBsum
Search
- PMC: articles
- PubMed: articles
- NCBI: proteins

Pseudolysin (EC 3.4.24.26, Pseudomonas elastase, Pseudomonas aeruginosa neutral metalloproteinase) is an enzyme. This enzyme catalyses the following chemical reaction

Hydrolysis of proteins including elastin, collagen types III and IV, fibronectin and immunoglobulin A, generally with bulky hydrophobic group at P1'. Insulin B chain cleavage pattern identical to that of thermolysin, but specificity differs in other respects

This enzyme belongs to the peptidase family M4 (thermolysin family).
