= D-amino acid dehydrogenase (quinone) =

Identifiers
- EC no.: 1.4.5.1

Databases
- IntEnz: IntEnz view
- BRENDA: BRENDA entry
- ExPASy: NiceZyme view
- KEGG: KEGG entry
- MetaCyc: metabolic pathway
- PRIAM: profile
- PDB structures: RCSB PDB PDBe PDBsum
Search
- PMC: articles
- PubMed: articles
- NCBI: proteins

D-amino acid dehydrogenase (quinone) (EC 1.4.5.1, DadA) is an enzyme with systematic name D-amino acid:quinone oxidoreductase (deaminating). This enzyme catalyses the following chemical reaction

D-amino acid + H_{2}O + quinone $\rightleftharpoons$ 2-oxo carboxylate + NH_{3} + quinol

For example, the bacterium Escherichia coli B acts on D-phenylalanine:

D-phenylalanine
+ a quinone
H_{2}O
NH_{3}
H_{2}O
NH_{3}
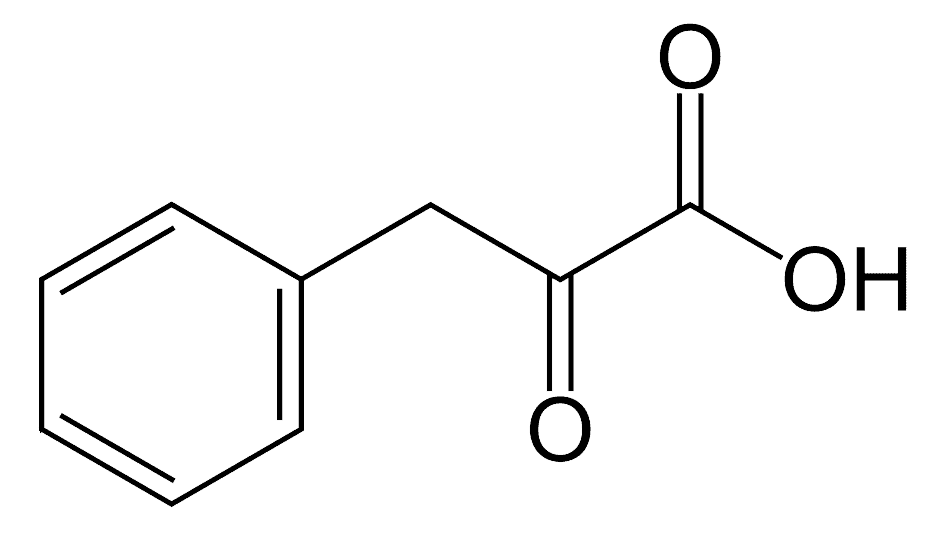
phenylpyruvic acid
+ a quinol

This enzyme is iron-sulfur flavoprotein.
