= Bacillolysin =

Identifiers
- EC no.: 3.4.24.28
- CAS no.: 9080-56-2

Databases
- IntEnz: IntEnz view
- BRENDA: BRENDA entry
- ExPASy: NiceZyme view
- KEGG: KEGG entry
- MetaCyc: metabolic pathway
- PRIAM: profile
- PDB structures: RCSB PDB PDBe PDBsum
Search
- PMC: articles
- PubMed: articles
- NCBI: proteins

Bacillolysin (EC 3.4.24.28, Bacillus metalloendopeptidase, Bacillus subtilis neutral proteinase, anilozyme P 10, Bacillus metalloproteinase, Bacillus neutral proteinase, megateriopeptidase) is an enzyme. This enzyme catalyses the following chemical reaction

Similar, but not identical, to that of thermolysin

This enzyme is present in many Bacillus species, including B. subtilis, B. amyloliquefaciens, B. megaterium, B. mesentericus, B. cereus and B. stearothermophilus.
