= RB-120 =

Chemical compound

Identifiers
- IUPAC name: N-{(S)-2-benzyl-3[(S)-(2-amino-4-methylthio)butyldithio]-1-oxopropyl}-l-alanine benzyl ester
- CAS Number: 203497-85-2
- PubChem CID: 54470354
- IUPHAR/BPS: 11651
- ChEMBL: ChEMBL3299158
- CompTox Dashboard (EPA): DTXSID601336315

Chemical and physical data
- Formula: C_{25}H_{34}N_{2}O_{3}S_{3}
- Molar mass: 506.74 g·mol^{−1}
- 3D model (JSmol): Interactive image
- SMILES: C[C@@H](C(=O)OCC1=CC=CC=C1)NC(=O)[C@H](CC2=CC=CC=C2)CSSC[C@H](CCSC)N
- InChI: InChI=1S/C25H34N2O3S3/c1-19(25(29)30-16-21-11-7-4-8-12-21)27-24(28)22(15-20-9-5-3-6-10-20)17-32-33-18-23(26)13-14-31-2/h3-12,19,22-23H,13-18,26H2,1-2H3,(H,27,28)/t19-,22+,23-/m0/s1; Key:XHWYFTNNIZGHRW-PMOQBDJRSA-N

RB-120 (benzyl (2S)-2-{[(2S)-2-({[(2S)-2-amino-4-methylsulfanylbutyl]disulfanyl}methyl)-3-phenylpropanoyl]amino}propanoate) is an orally active analog of the drug RB-101. It acts as an enkephalinase inhibitor, which is used in scientific research. Via intravenous administration, it is approximately three times as potent as RB-101 or twice as potent as the isolated (S,S) isomer of RB101. However, via i.p. administration it is approximately twice as potent as racemic RB-101 and about as potent as the isolated (S,S) isomer of RB101. During i.v. administration RB120 is approximately twice as weak as morphine in terms of analgesia; however, it is 16x weaker during i.p. and p.o. administration.

== Dosage ==
RB 120 produces a significant dose-dependent antinociceptive response in the rat tail-flick test at 10 and 25 min after i.v. administration, at doses of 12.5, 25 and 50 mg/kg.

The analgesic effect occurred with a slower onset compared to typical IV opioids likely because, following enkephalinase inhibition, it may take some time for endogenous enkephalin to accumulate without degradation until sufficient concentration is reached for analgesic effect, whereas for opioids, onset only requires entry into the brain via the blood–brain barrier which occurs rapidly for lipophilic molecules, and binding to the opioid receptor produces a near-instantaneous G-protein mediated response and production of second messenger, without need for de novo synthesis of any neurotransmitters.
