= Streptomyces cavourensis =

Scientific classification
- Domain: Bacteria
- Kingdom: Bacillati
- Phylum: Actinomycetota
- Class: Actinomycetes
- Order: Streptomycetales
- Family: Streptomycetaceae
- Genus: Streptomyces
- Species: S. cavourensis

Binomial name
- Streptomyces cavourensis Skarbek and Brady 1978

Type strain
- 829.8.52, AS 4.1692, ATCC 14889, ATCC 25438, BCRC 15135, CBS 669.69, CCRC 15135, CGMCC 4.1692, CMI 70852, DSM 40300, DSM 41795, Giolitti 829, IFO 13026, IMI 070582, IMI 070852, IMRU 3758, ISP 5300, JCM 4249, JCM 4298, JCM 4555, KCC S-0249, KCC S-0298, KCC S-0555, KCCS-0249, KCCS-0298, KCCS-0555, Montecatini Coll. 829, NBRC 13026, NCIB 8918, NCIMB 8918, NRRL 2740, NRRL-ISP 5300, RIA 1218, VKM Ac-731, VTT E-991425

Synonyms
- Streptomyces cavourensis subsp. cavourensis Skarbek and Brady 1978 (Approved Lists 1980)

Species of bacterium

Streptomyces cavourensis is a bacterium species from the genus of Streptomyces which has been isolated from soil in Italy. Streptomyces cavourensis produces flavensomycin.

== See also ==
- List of Streptomyces species
