= Fiona Marshall (pharmacologist) =

British pharmacologist

Fiona Marshall FRS FMedSci
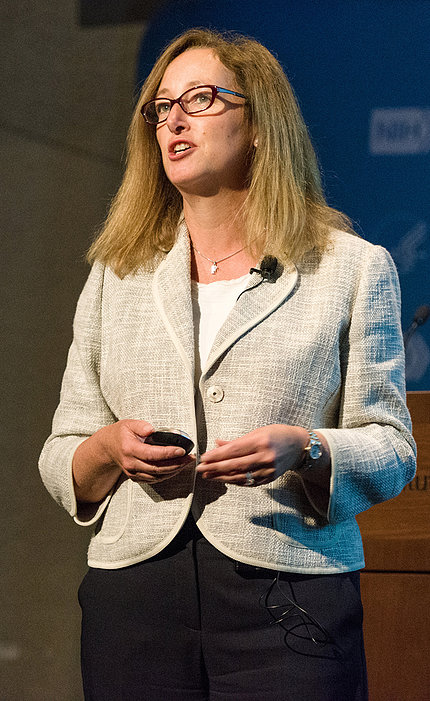
- Marshall speaking at the National Institutes of Health 2017 Daly lecture
- Born: Fiona Hamilton Marshall
- Education: University of Bath (BSc); University of Cambridge (PhD)
- Scientific career
- Fields: Drug discovery GPCRs; Neuroscience
- Workplaces: Novartis; Merck & Co. GlaxoSmithKline
- Thesis: Cholecystokinin/dopamine interactions in the rat basal ganglia (1990)
- Doctoral advisor: John Hughes

Fiona Hamilton Marshall FRS FMedSci is a British pharmacologist, biotech-founder and President of Biomedical Research at Novartis. She founded and previously served as Chief Scientific Officer at Heptares Therapeutics, which was acquired by the Japanese biopharmaceutical company Sosei, where she served as Vice President. She was elected Fellow of the Academy of Medical Sciences in 2016 and the Royal Society in 2021.

== Early life and education ==
Marshall became interested in biology, chemistry and physics at high school. As a teenager she won a prize at a national physics competition. Marshall graduated with a First class degree in biochemistry from the University of Bath in 1987. She moved to the University of Cambridge for her graduate studies, where she focussed on neuroscience under the supervision of John Hughes. Her doctoral advisor served as director of the University of Cambridge Parke-Davis Research Centre, which inspired Marshall to work in the pharmaceutical industry.

== Research and career ==
After earning her doctorate Marshall moved to GlaxoSmithKline where she joined the department of neuropharmacology. Marshall worked alongside Patrick Humphrey and Mike Tyers at GlaxoSmithKline. Here she investigated the receptors that are activated by neurotransmitters and microbial metabolites. After only nine years, Marshall was made Head of Molecular Pharmacology in 1999. She eventually moved from the neuropharmacology team to a group working on G protein-coupled receptors. Almost a third of drugs work through these G protein-coupled receptors. She was the first to identify and describe the cloning and structural requirements of the GABAB receptor, a member of the GPCR family. She was headhunted by Millennium Pharmaceuticals and joined as their Director of Molecular Pharmacology in 2000. When her children were young, Marshall took time away from her work in the pharmaceutical Industry to work more flexibly as a consultant.

Working with Malcolm Weir, and together with Christopher Tate and Richard Henderson, Marshall founded Heptares Therapeutics, a spin-out from the Medical Research Council (MRC). Heptares makes use of technologies developed by the Medical Research Council that allow the crystallisation and characterisation of G protein-coupled receptors for drug design. This included the first crystal structure of the GLP-1 receptor. One of the cancer therapy drug candidates developed by Heptares was licensed to AstraZeneca in 2015. Later that year, Heptares was incorporated into the Japanese bio-pharmaceutical company Sosei.

Marshall joined Merck & Co as Head of the UK Discovery Research Centre in 2018. In this capacity she concentrated on diseases of ageing. In 2019 she was made Global Head of Neuroscience Discovery, where she spent two years before being appointed Senior Vice President of Discovery, Preclinical & Translational Medicine Research. In 2022 she became the President of Biomedical Research at Novartis.

=== Awards and honours ===
- 2012 WISE Campaign award for Innovation and Entrepreneurship
- 2015 Royal Society of Chemistry Malcolm Campbell Award
- 2016 Elected a Fellow of the Academy of Medical Sciences (FMedSci)
- 2016 Honorary degree at the University of Bath
- 2018 Vane Medal from the British Pharmacological Society
- 2018 Honorary Fellow of British Pharmacological Society
- 2021 Elected a Fellow of the Royal Society (FRS)

=== Selected publications ===
- White, J H; Wise, A; Main, M J; et al. (1998). "Heterodimerization is required for the formation of a functional GABA(B) receptor". Nature. 396 (6712): 679–82. Bibcode:1998Natur.396..679W. doi:10.1038/25354. PMID 9872316. Wikidata Q22008591.
- Ali Jazayeri; Mathieu Rappas; Alastair J H Brown; et al. (2017). "Crystal structure of the GLP-1 receptor bound to a peptide agonist". Nature. 546 (7657): 254–258. doi:10.1038/nature22800. PMID 28562585. Wikidata Q50968563.
- N. G. Bowery; B. Bettler; W. Froestl; J. P. Gallagher; Marshall, Fiona; M. Raiteri; T. I. Bonner; S. J. Enna (2002). "International Union of Pharmacology. XXXIII. Mammalian gamma-aminobutyric acid(B) receptors: structure and function". Pharmacological Reviews. 54 (2): 247–264. doi:10.1124/pr.54.2.247. PMID 12037141. Wikidata Q34130831.
- Alan Wise; Steven M Foord; Neil J Fraser; et al. (2003). "Molecular identification of high and low affinity receptors for nicotinic acid". Journal of Biological Chemistry. 278 (11): 9869–9874. doi:10.1074/jbc.m210695200. PMID 12522134. Wikidata Q28202556.
- Marshall, Fiona; Kenneth A Jones; Klemens Kaupmann; Bernhard Bettler (1999). "GABAB receptors - the first 7TM heterodimers". Trends in Pharmacological Sciences. 20 (10): 396–399. doi:10.1016/s0165-6147(99)01383-8. PMID 10498952. Wikidata Q33739386.
