= Flavensomycin =

Names
- IUPAC name [(E)-7,9,11,13,15,17,19,21,23-nonaoxooctatriacont-3-enyl] (E)-4-[(2-hydroxy-5-oxocyclopenten-1-yl)amino]-4-oxobut-2-enoate

Identifiers
CAS Number	29382-82-9
3D model (JSmol)	Interactive image
ChemSpider	4948761
PubChem CID	6444925
- InChI: InChI=1S/C47H65NO14/c1-2-3-4-5-6-7-8-9-10-11-12-13-16-19-34(49)26-36(51)28-38(53)30-40(55)32-42(57)33-41(56)31-39(54)29-37(52)27-35(50)20-17-14-15-18-25-62-46(61)24-23-45(60)48-47-43(58)21-22-44(47)59/h14-15,23-24,58H,2-13,16-22,25-33H2,1H3,(H,48,60)/b15-14+,24-23+ Key: ASNAXPLWUAPUIY-ITNOJFFJSA-N
- SMILES: CCCCCCCCCCCCCCCC(=O)CC(=O)CC(=O)CC(=O)CC(=O)CC(=O)CC(=O)CC(=O)CC(=O)CC/C=C/CCOC(=O)/C=C/C(=O)NC1=C(CCC1=O)O

Properties
Chemical formula	C_{47}H_{65}NO_{14}
Molar mass	868.030 g·mol^{−1}
- Except where otherwise noted, data are given for materials in their standard state (at 25 °C [77 °F], 100 kPa). Infobox references

Flavensomycin is an antibiotic and fungicide with the molecular formula C_{47}H_{64}NO_{14}. Flavensomycin has been first isolated in 1957 from a culture of Streptomyces tanashiensis bacteria.
