= Kalafungin =

Chemical compound

Clinical data
- Other names: U-19718
- ATC code: None

Identifiers
- IUPAC name: (3aR,5R,11bR)-7-Hydroxy-5-methyl-3,3a,5,11b-tetrahydro-2H-benzo[g]furo[3,2-c]isochromene-2,6,11-trione
- CAS Number: 11048-15-0
- PubChem CID: 283138
- ChemSpider: 391931
- UNII: 7HR91T5TGW
- KEGG: D04648
- ChEMBL: ChEMBL1988648
- CompTox Dashboard (EPA): DTXSID40864305

Chemical and physical data
- Formula: C_{16}H_{12}O_{6}
- Molar mass: 300.266 g·mol^{−1}
- 3D model (JSmol): Interactive image
- SMILES: C[C@@H]1C2=C([C@@H]3[C@H](O1)CC(=O)O3)C(=O)c4cccc(c4C2=O)O
- InChI: InChI=1S/C16H12O6/c1-6-11-13(16-9(21-6)5-10(18)22-16)14(19)7-3-2-4-8(17)12(7)15(11)20/h2-4,6,9,16-17H,5H2,1H3/t6-,9-,16+/m1/s1; Key:XUWPJKDMEZSVTP-LTYMHZPRSA-N

Kalafungin is a substance discovered in the 1960s and found to act as a broad-spectrum antibiotic in vitro. It was isolated from a strain of the bacterium Streptomyces tanashiensis.

It is not known to be marketed anywhere in the world.
