= Thiorphan =

Chemical compound

Clinical data
- ATC code: none

Identifiers
- IUPAC name: (±)-2-[(2-benzyl-3-sulfanyl-propanoyl)amino]acetic acid
- CAS Number: 76721-89-6
- PubChem CID: 3132
- DrugBank: DB08626
- ChemSpider: 3020
- UNII: B79L7B5X3Z
- KEGG: C01619
- ChEMBL: ChEMBL10247
- CompTox Dashboard (EPA): DTXSID70868412

Chemical and physical data
- Formula: C_{12}H_{15}NO_{3}S
- Molar mass: 253.32 g·mol^{−1}
- 3D model (JSmol): Interactive image
- Chirality: Racemic mixture
- SMILES: C1=CC=C(C=C1)CC(CS)C(=O)NCC(=O)O
- InChI: InChI=1S/C12H15NO3S/c14-11(15)7-13-12(16)10(8-17)6-9-4-2-1-3-5-9/h1-5,10,17H,6-8H2,(H,13,16)(H,14,15); Key:LJJKNPQAGWVLDQ-UHFFFAOYSA-N

Thiorphan is the active metabolite of the antidiarrheal racecadotril (acetorphan). It prevents the degradation of endogenous enkephalins by acting as an enkephalinase inhibitor.
