= D-Phenylalanine =

Chemical compound

Clinical data
- Trade names: Deprenon, Sabiben, Sabiden
- Other names: D-(+)-Phenylalanine; (R)-(+)-Phenylalanine; (R)-Phenylalanine; D-β-Phenylalanine; DPA; D-Phe
- Routes of administration: By mouth
- Drug class: Antidepressants; Enkephalinase inhibitors

Identifiers
- IUPAC name: (2R)-2-amino-3-phenylpropanoic acid
- CAS Number: 673-06-3
- PubChem CID: 71567
- DrugBank: DB02556
- ChemSpider: 64639
- UNII: 032K16VRCU
- KEGG: C02265
- ChEBI: CHEBI:16998
- ChEMBL: ChEMBL379630
- CompTox Dashboard (EPA): DTXSID4025876
- ECHA InfoCard: 100.010.549

Chemical and physical data
- Formula: C_{9}H_{11}NO_{2}
- Molar mass: 165.192 g·mol^{−1}
- 3D model (JSmol): Interactive image
- SMILES: C1=CC=C(C=C1)C[C@H](C(=O)O)N
- InChI: InChI=1S/C9H11NO2/c10-8(9(11)12)6-7-4-2-1-3-5-7/h1-5,8H,6,10H2,(H,11,12)/t8-/m1/s1; Key:COLNVLDHVKWLRT-MRVPVSSYSA-N

D-Phenylalanine (DPA, D-Phe), sold under the brand names Deprenon, Sabiben, and Sabiden, is an enantiomer of phenylalanine which is described as an antidepressant and is marketed as a prescription drug for medical use in Argentina. The medication has been marketed since at least the 1970s and continued to be available by the 2000s.

D-Phenylalanine has been found to act as an enkephalinase inhibitor, an inhibitor of enkephalinase enzymes that break down endogenous opioid peptides called enkephalins. It has been found to produce anti-inflammatory, analgesic, and anti-craving effects in animal studies.

== See also ==
- Phenylalanine § D-, L- and DL-phenylalanine
