= Streptomyces tanashiensis =

Scientific classification
- Domain: Bacteria
- Kingdom: Bacillati
- Phylum: Actinomycetota
- Class: Actinomycetes
- Order: Streptomycetales
- Family: Streptomycetaceae
- Genus: Streptomyces
- Species: S. tanashiensis

Binomial name
- Streptomyces tanashiensis Hata et al. 1952

Type strain
- 950.68, AS 4.1924, ATCC 23967, BCRC 12641, CBS 165.54, CBS 165.64, CBS 950.68, CCRC 12641, CGMCC 4.1924, DSM 40195, ETH 28389, Hata 144, HUT-6070, IAM H-2053, IFO 12919, IMET 42939, ISP 5195, JCM 4086, JCM 4671, KCTC 19972, KITA 144, LMG 20274, NBRC 12919, NRRL B-1692, NRRL B-1692 ?, NRRL B-1920, NRRL-ISP 5195, RIA 1148, VKM Ac-1892

Species of bacterium

Streptomyces tanashiensis is a bacterium species from the genus of Streptomyces which has been isolated from soil in Japan. Streptomyces tanashiensis produces luteomycin, mithramycin, phosphoramidon and kalafungin.

== See also ==
- List of Streptomyces species
