= Sivelestat =

Chemical compound

Clinical data
- AHFS/Drugs.com: International Drug Names
- Routes of administration: IV
- ATC code: None

Legal status
- Legal status: US: Not approved; In general: ℞ (Prescription only)

Identifiers
- IUPAC name: N-{2-[({4-[(2,2-dimethylpropanoyl)oxy]phenyl}sulfonyl)amino]benzoyl}glycine
- CAS Number: 127373-66-4
- PubChem CID: 107706
- IUPHAR/BPS: 6441
- DrugBank: DB12863
- ChemSpider: 96875
- UNII: DWI62G0P59
- KEGG: D03788
- ChEMBL: ChEMBL76688
- CompTox Dashboard (EPA): DTXSID9048304

Chemical and physical data
- Formula: C_{20}H_{22}N_{2}O_{7}S
- Molar mass: 434.46 g·mol^{−1}
- 3D model (JSmol): Interactive image
- SMILES: CC(C)(C)C(=O)OC1=CC=C(C=C1)S(=O)(=O)NC2=CC=CC=C2C(=O)NCC(=O)O
- InChI: InChI=1S/C20H22N2O7S/c1-20(2,3)19(26)29-13-8-10-14(11-9-13)30(27,28)22-16-7-5-4-6-15(16)18(25)21-12-17(23)24/h4-11,22H,12H2,1-3H3,(H,21,25)(H,23,24); Key:BTGNGJJLZOIYID-UHFFFAOYSA-N

Sivelestat (INN, research name ONO 5046, marketed as Elaspol) is an inhibitor of human neutrophil elastase.

It is used in the treatment of acute respiratory failure and preliminary studies show it may also improve neuropathic pain.

== Synthesis ==
Sivelestat is synthesised as follows:

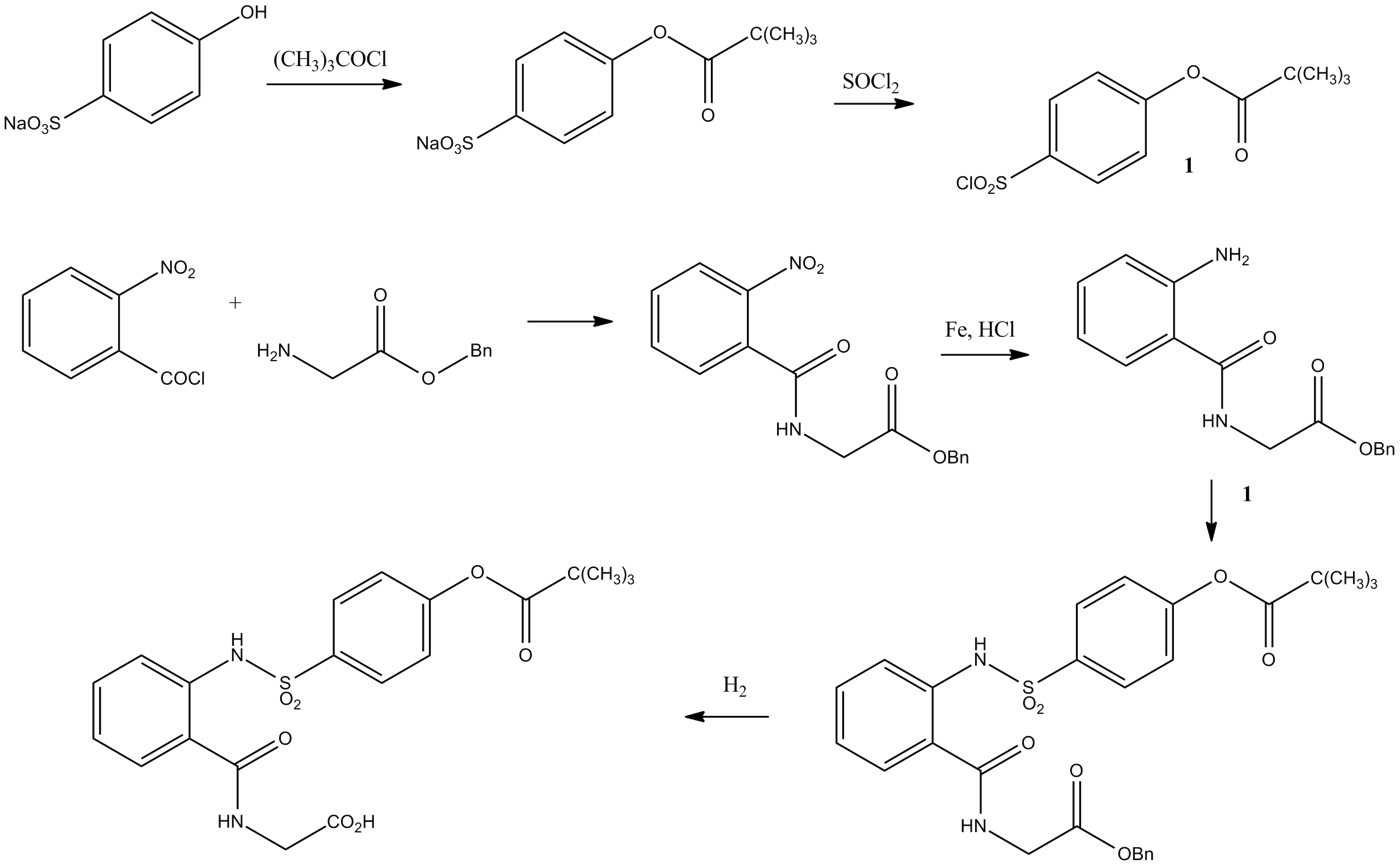
