= Leu-enkephalin =

Neurotransmitter

Names
- IUPAC name (2R)-2-[[(2R)-2-[[2-[[2-[[(2R)-2-amino-3-(4-hydroxyphenyl)propanoyl]amino]acetyl]amino]acetyl]amino]-3-phenylpropanoyl]amino]-4-methylpentanoic acid
- Other names [Leu]enkephalin; [Leu^{5}]enkephalin;

Identifiers
CAS Number	58822-25-6
3D model (JSmol)	Interactive image
ChEBI	CHEBI:89656
ChEMBL	ChEMBL8234
ChemSpider	406229
ECHA InfoCard	100.055.852
IUPHAR/BPS	1613
PubChem CID	461776
UNII	RI01R707R6
CompTox Dashboard (EPA)	DTXSID00905127
- InChI: InChI=1S/C28H37N5O7/c1-17(2)12-23(28(39)40)33-27(38)22(14-18-6-4-3-5-7-18)32-25(36)16-30-24(35)15-31-26(37)21(29)13-19-8-10-20(34)11-9-19/h3-11,17,21-23,34H,12-16,29H2,1-2H3,(H,30,35)(H,31,37)(H,32,36)(H,33,38)(H,39,40)/t21-,22-,23-/m0/s1 Key: URLZCHNOLZSCCA-VABKMULXSA-N; InChI=1/C28H37N5O7/c1-17(2)12-23(28(39)40)33-27(38)22(14-18-6-4-3-5-7-18)32-25(36)16-30-24(35)15-31-26(37)21(29)13-19-8-10-20(34)11-9-19/h3-11,17,21-23,34H,12-16,29H2,1-2H3,(H,30,35)(H,31,37)(H,32,36)(H,33,38)(H,39,40)/t21-,22-,23-/m0/s1 Key: URLZCHNOLZSCCA-VABKMULXBR
- SMILES: O=C(O)[C@@H](NC(=O)[C@@H](NC(=O)CNC(=O)CNC(=O)[C@@H](N)Cc1ccc(O)cc1)Cc2ccccc2)CC(C)C

Properties
Chemical formula	C_{28}H_{37}N_{5}O_{7}
Molar mass	555.62 g/mol
- Except where otherwise noted, data are given for materials in their standard state (at 25 °C [77 °F], 100 kPa). verify (what is ?) Infobox references

Leu-enkephalin is an endogenous opioid peptide neurotransmitter with the amino acid sequence Tyr-Gly-Gly-Phe-Leu that is found naturally in the brains of many animals, including humans. It is one of the two forms of enkephalin; the other is met-enkephalin. The tyrosine residue at position 1 is thought to be analogous to the 3-hydroxyl group on morphine. Leu-enkephalin has agonistic actions at both the μ- and δ-opioid receptors, with significantly greater preference for the latter. It has little to no effect on the κ-opioid receptor.

A nasal spray formulation of leu-enkephalin (developmental code names NES-100, NM-0127, NM-127, PES-200; proposed brand name Envelta) is under development by Virpax Pharmaceuticals for the treatment of pain and post-traumatic stress disorder (PTSD). As of November 2023, it is up to the preclinical stage of development for these indications.

== See also ==
- Met-enkephalin
- Enkephalinase
