= Talopeptin =

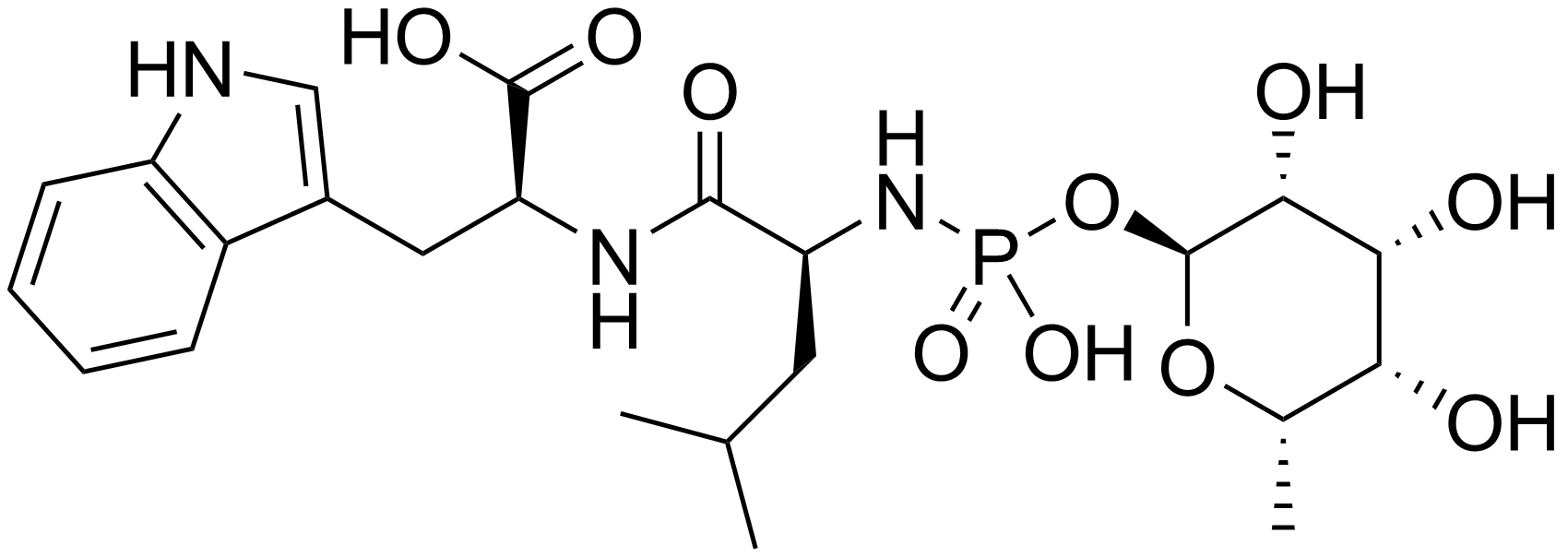

Names
- Systematic IUPAC name (2S)-2-{(2S)-2-[(Hydroxy{[(2S,3R,4R,5S,6S)-3,4,5-trihydroxy-6-methyloxan-2-yl]oxy}phosphoryl)amino]-4-methylpentanamido}-3-(1H-indol-3-yl)propanoic acid
- Other names N-(N-{[(6-Deoxy-α-L-talopyranosyl)oxy]hydroxyphosphinyl}-L-leucyl)-L-tryptophan

Identifiers
| CAS Number | 84235-60-9 |
| 3D model (JSmol) | Interactive image |
| ChemSpider | 118729 |
| PubChem CID | 134712 |
| CompTox Dashboard (EPA) | DTXSID401029277 |
- InChI: InChI=1S/C23H34N3O10P/c1-11(2)8-16(26-37(33,34)36-23-20(29)19(28)18(27)12(3)35-23)21(30)25-17(22(31)32)9-13-10-24-15-7-5-4-6-14(13)15/h4-7,10-12,16-20,23-24,27-29H,8-9H2,1-3H3,(H,25,30)(H,31,32)(H2,26,33,34)/t12-,16-,17-,18+,19+,20+,23-/m0/s1 Key: ZPHBZEQOLSRPAK-XVOJFHBISA-N
- SMILES: O=C(O)[C@@H](NC([C@H](CC(C)C)NP(O[C@@H]1O[C@@H](C)[C@@H](O)[C@@H](O)[C@H]1O)(O)=O)=O)CC2=CNC3=C2C=CC=C3

Properties
| Chemical formula | C_{23}H_{34}N_{3}O_{10}P |
| Molar mass | 543.510 g·mol^{−1} |
- Except where otherwise noted, data are given for materials in their standard state (at 25 °C [77 °F], 100 kPa). verify (what is ?) Infobox references

Talopeptin is a chemical compound derived from cultures of Streptomyces. It is a known reversible inhibitor of thermolysin and is expected to inhibit other metalloproteinases. Chemically, talopeptin differs from its closely related peptidase inhibitor phosphoramidon by a single stereocenter.
