= Nafamostat =

Chemical compound

Nafamostat mesylate

Clinical data
- AHFS/Drugs.com: International Drug Names
- Routes of administration: IV
- ATC code: none

Legal status
- Legal status: In general: ℞ (Prescription only)

Identifiers
- IUPAC name: 6-[amino(imino)methyl]-2-naphthyl 4-{[amino(imino)methyl]amino}benzoate
- CAS Number: 81525-10-2
- PubChem CID: 4413
- IUPHAR/BPS: 4262
- ChemSpider: 4260
- UNII: Y25LQ0H97D
- KEGG: D01670
- CompTox Dashboard (EPA): DTXSID0048420

Chemical and physical data
- Formula: C_{19}H_{17}N_{5}O_{2}
- Molar mass: 347.378 g·mol^{−1}
- 3D model (JSmol): Interactive image
- SMILES: N=C(N)c1ccc2cc(OC(=O)c3ccc(N=C(N)N)cc3)ccc2c1
- InChI: InChI=1S/C19H17N5O2/c20-17(21)14-2-1-13-10-16(8-5-12(13)9-14)26-18(25)11-3-6-15(7-4-11)24-19(22)23/h1-10H,(H3,20,21)(H4,22,23,24); Key:MQQNFDZXWVTQEH-UHFFFAOYSA-N

Nafamostat mesylate (INN), a synthetic serine protease inhibitor, is a short-acting anticoagulant, and it is also used for the treatment of pancreatitis. It also has some potential antiviral and anti-cancer properties. Nafamostat is a fast-acting proteolytic inhibitor and used during hemodialysis to prevent the proteolysis of fibrinogen into fibrin. The mechanism of action of nafamostat is as a slow tight-binding substrate, trapping the target protein in the acyl-enzyme intermediate form, resulting in apparent observed inhibition.

It inhibits a large number of Lys/Arg specific serine proteinases, and is also a tryptase inhibitor, which is implicated in leaking blood vessels which is symptomatic of dengue hemorrhagic fever and of end-stage dengue shock syndrome. It is available in a generic form already used for the treatment of certain bleeding complications in some countries, there are risks of severe complications such as: agranulocytosis, hyperkalemia, and anaphylaxis which must be weighed in non-emergency care. In some countries, it used as a treatment for pancreatitis and pancreatic cancer.

This drug has been identified as a potential therapy for COVID-19, with clinical trials in Japan possibly set to begin in March 2020. With evidence that nafamostat is a potent anti-viral inhibitor in lung cells, a second round of clinical trials in Korea has begun with 10 hospitals participating. Multiple Phase 2/3 and Phase 3 clinical trials for COVID-19 in different countries are ongoing.

It has also been reported to target tubulin, favorizing its polymerization.
