= Dipeptidyl-peptidase III =

Identifiers
- EC no.: 3.4.14.4
- CAS no.: 77464-87-0

Databases
- IntEnz: IntEnz view
- BRENDA: BRENDA entry
- ExPASy: NiceZyme view
- KEGG: KEGG entry
- MetaCyc: metabolic pathway
- PRIAM: profile
- PDB structures: RCSB PDB PDBe PDBsum
Search
- PMC: articles
- PubMed: articles
- NCBI: proteins

Dipeptidyl-peptidase III (EC 3.4.14.4, dipeptidyl aminopeptidase III, dipeptidyl arylamidase III, enkephalinase B, red cell angiotensinase) is an enzyme. This enzyme catalyses the following chemical reaction

Release of an N-terminal dipeptide from a peptide comprising four or more residues, with broad specificity. Also acts on dipeptidyl 2-naphthylamides.

This cytosolic peptidase that is active at neutral pH.
