= Phosphoramidon =

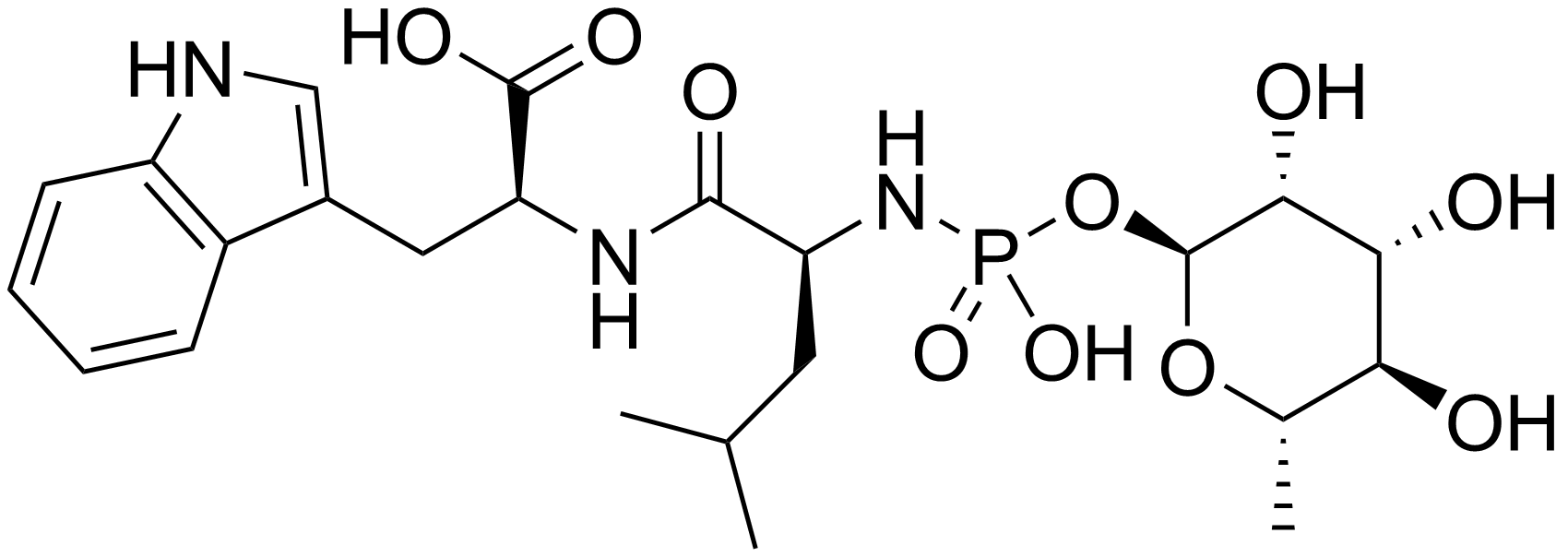

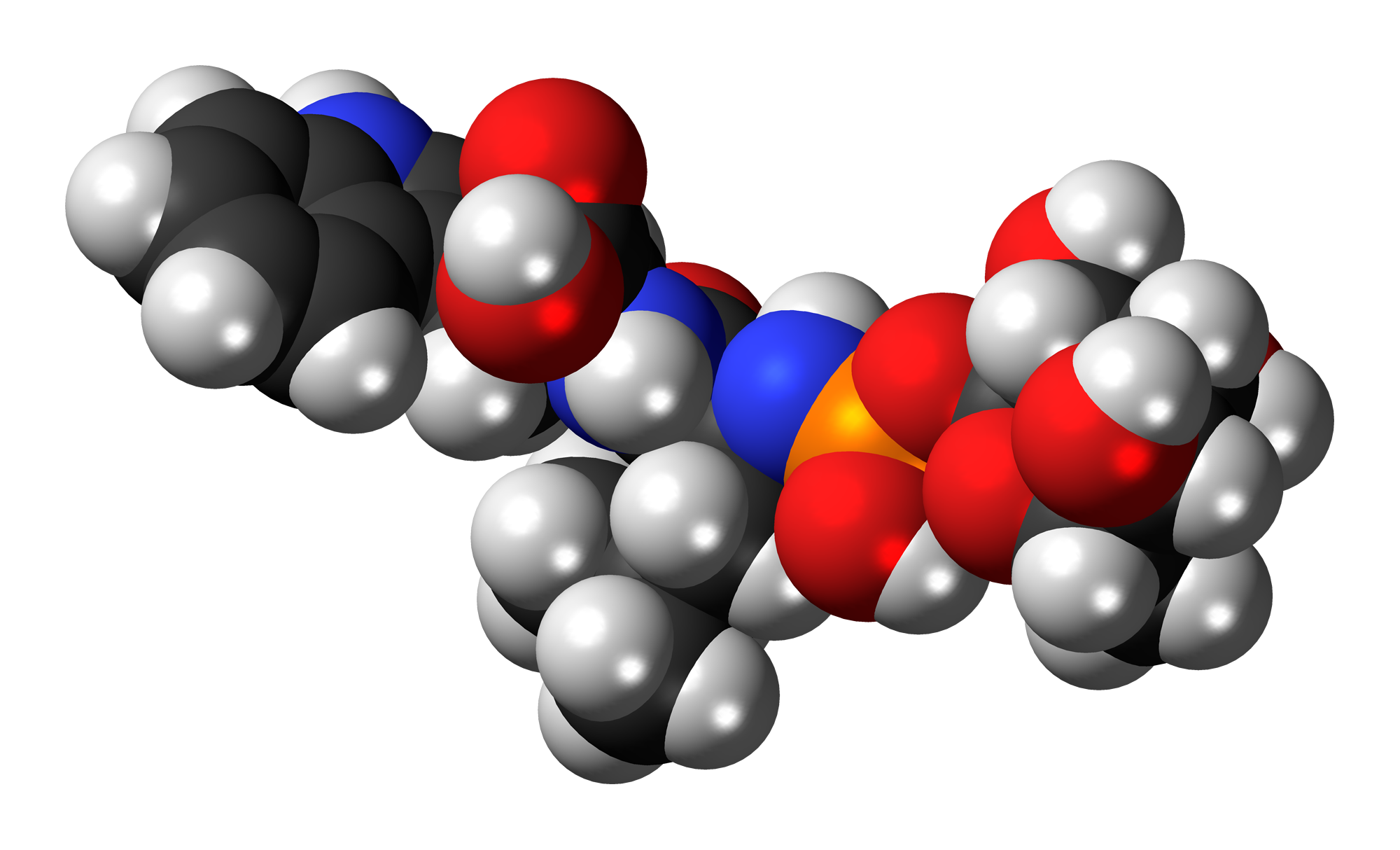

Names
- IUPAC name (2S)-2-{{#parsoidfragment:0}}(2S)-2-{{#parsoidfragment:1}}hydroxy-[(2S,3R,4R,5R,6S)-3,4,5-trihydroxy-6-methyloxan-2-yl]oxyphosphoryl]amino]-4-methylpentanoyl]amino]-3-(1H-indol-3-yl)propanoic acid
- Other names N-[N-{{#parsoidfragment:2}}(6-deoxy-α-L-mannoopyranosyl)oxy]hydroxyphosphinyl]-L-leucyl]-L-tryptophan

Identifiers
CAS Number	36357-77-4
3D model (JSmol)	Interactive image
ChEBI	CHEBI:45353
ChEMBL	ChEMBL479579
ChemSpider	392848
ECHA InfoCard	100.048.164
EC Number	252-996-3
KEGG	C00563
PubChem CID	445114
UNII	T3G94E2LB1
CompTox Dashboard (EPA)	DTXSID601317292
- InChI: InChI=1S/C23H34N3O10P/c1-11(2)8-16(26-37(33,34)36-23-20(29)19(28)18(27)12(3)35-23)21(30)25-17(22(31)32)9-13-10-24-15-7-5-4-6-14(13)15/h4-7,10-12,16-20,23-24,27-29H,8-9H2,1-3H3,(H,25,30)(H,31,32)(H2,26,33,34)/t12-,16-,17-,18-,19+,20+,23-/m0/s1 Key: ZPHBZEQOLSRPAK-XLCYBJAPSA-N; InChI=1/C23H34N3O10P/c1-11(2)8-16(26-37(33,34)36-23-20(29)19(28)18(27)12(3)35-23)21(30)25-17(22(31)32)9-13-10-24-15-7-5-4-6-14(13)15/h4-7,10-12,16-20,23-24,27-29H,8-9H2,1-3H3,(H,25,30)(H,31,32)(H2,26,33,34)/t12-,16-,17-,18-,19+,20+,23-/m0/s1 Key: ZPHBZEQOLSRPAK-XLCYBJAPBL
- SMILES: O=C(O)[C@@H](NC([C@H](CC(C)C)NP(O[C@@H]1O[C@@H](C)[C@H](O)[C@@H](O)[C@H]1O)(O)=O)=O)CC2=CNC3=C2C=CC=C3

Properties
Chemical formula	C_{23}H_{34}N_{3}O_{10}P
Molar mass	543.510 g·mol^{−1}
Appearance	White to slightly yellow solid
Solubility in water	Soluble as sodium salt
Solubility in DMSO and methanol	Soluble as sodium salt
- Except where otherwise noted, data are given for materials in their standard state (at 25 °C [77 °F], 100 kPa). verify (what is ?) Infobox references

Phosphoramidon is a chemical compound derived from cultures of Streptomyces tanashiensis. It is an inhibitor of the enzyme thermolysin, of the membrane metallo-endopeptidase, and of the endothelin converting enzyme. Chemically, phosphoramidon differs from its closely related peptidase inhibitor talopeptin by a single stereocenter.

Because of its enzyme inhibitory properties, phosphoramidon is widely used as a biochemical tool.
