= Enkephalinase inhibitor =

Drug class

An enkephalinase inhibitor is a type of enzyme inhibitor which inhibits one or more members of the enkephalinase class of enzymes that break down the endogenous enkephalin opioid peptides. Examples include racecadotril, ubenimex (bestatin), RB-101, and D-phenylalanine, as well as the endogenous opioid peptides opiorphin and spinorphin. It also includes RB-3007, Semax and Selank. Analgesic, anticraving, antidepressant, anxiolytic, and antidiarrheal effects are common properties of enkephalinase inhibitors.

== See also ==
- Enkephalinase
- Enkephalin
