= Enkephalinase =

Enkephalinases are enzymes that degrade endogenous enkephalin opioid peptides. They include:

- Aminopeptidase N (APN)
- Neutral endopeptidase (NEP)
- Dipeptidyl peptidase 3 (DPP3)
- Carboxypeptidase A6 (CPA6)
- Leucyl/cystinyl aminopeptidase (LNPEP)
- Angiotensin-converting enzyme (ACE)

== See also ==
- Enkephalinase inhibitor
- Oxytocinase
