= Neprilysin =

Mammalian protein found in Homo sapiens

MME
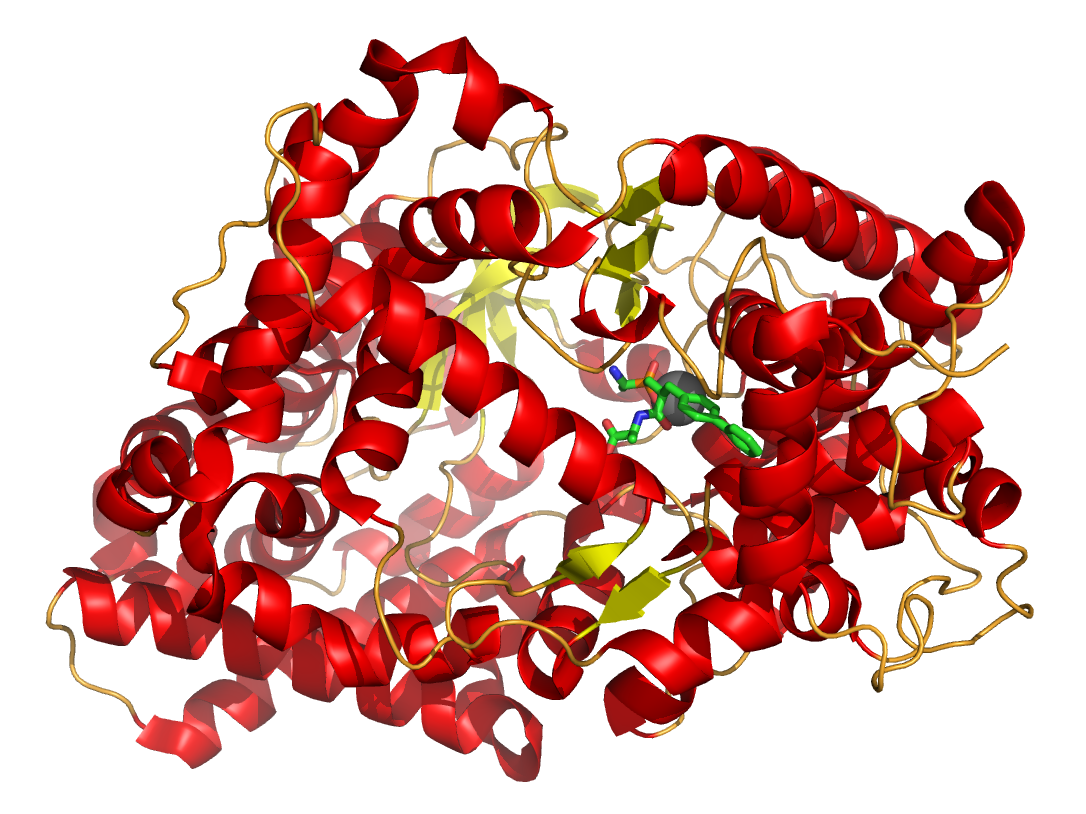

Identifiers
- Aliases: MME, CALLA, CD10, NEP, SFE, membrane metallo-endopeptidase, membrane metalloendopeptidase, CMT2T, SCA43
- External IDs: OMIM: 120520; MGI: 97004; GeneCards: MME
Available structures
PDB	Ortholog search: PDBe RCSB
PDB	List of PDB id codes 1DMT, 1R1H, 1R1I, 1R1J, 1Y8J, 2QPJ, 2YB9, 4CTH, 5JMY
Enzyme activity
EC #	BRENDA	ExPASy	KEGG	MetaCyc
3.4.24.11	↗	↗	↗	↗

Gene location (Human)
Chr.	Chromosome 3 (human)
Band	3q25.2	Start	155,024,124 bp
Band	3q25.2	End	155,183,704 bp

Gene location (Mouse)
Chr.	Chromosome 3 (mouse)
Band	3 E1|3 29.97 cM	Start	63,148,958 bp
Band	3 E1|3 29.97 cM	End	63,293,451 bp
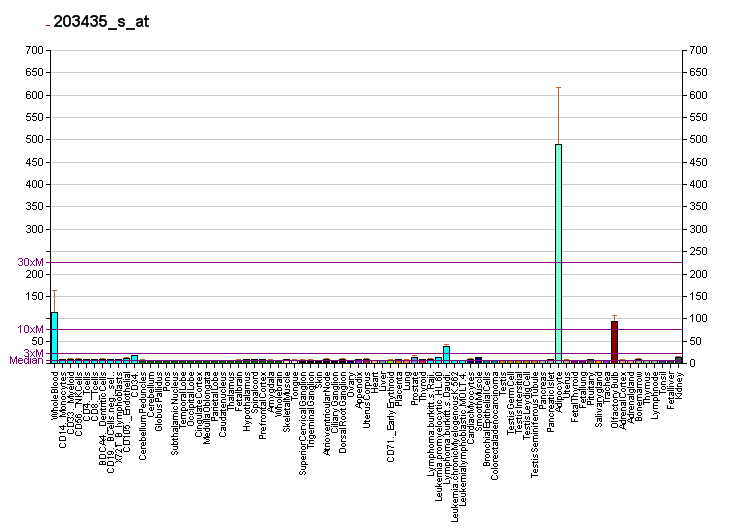

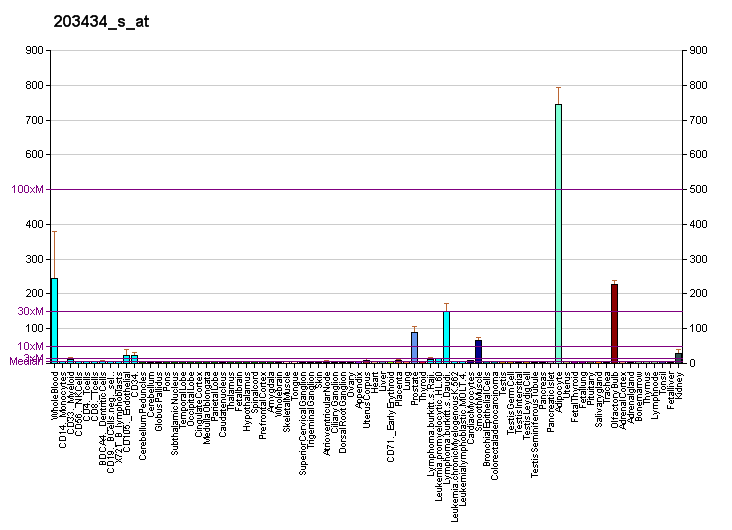
RNA expression pattern
Bgee	Human / Mouse (ortholog); Top expressed in: jejunal mucosa; glomerulus; metanephric glomerulus; stromal cell of endometrium; duodenum; kidney tubule; sural nerve; human kidney; mucosa of ileum; blood / Top expressed in: epithelium of lens; molar; vestibular sensory epithelium; prostate; Gonadal ridge; lobe of prostate; vestibular membrane of cochlear duct; external carotid artery; calvaria; vas deferens; More reference expression data
BioGPS	More reference expression data
Gene ontology
Molecular function	protein binding; zinc ion binding; exopeptidase activity; hydrolase activity; endopeptidase activity; metal ion binding; peptidase activity; peptide binding; metalloendopeptidase activity; metallopeptidase activity; phosphatidylserine binding; protein homodimerization activity; oligopeptidase activity; cardiolipin binding
Cellular component	brush border; focal adhesion; integral component of plasma membrane; cytoplasm; membrane; extracellular exosome; integral component of membrane; synaptic vesicle; plasma membrane; synapse; axon; dendrite; neuron projection terminus; secretory granule membrane; early endosome; trans-Golgi network; cell surface; cytoplasmic vesicle; soma; membrane raft; presynapse
Biological process	angiotensin maturation; cellular response to UV-B; cellular response to cytokine stimulus; kidney development; replicative senescence; cellular response to UV-A; creatinine metabolic process; peptide metabolic process; amyloid-beta metabolic process; proteolysis; sensory perception of pain; neutrophil degranulation; placenta development; ageing; learning or memory; lung development; positive regulation of neurogenesis; neuropeptide processing; amyloid-beta clearance; amyloid-beta clearance by cellular catabolic process; positive regulation of long-term synaptic potentiation
Sources:Amigo / QuickGO
Orthologs
Databases	NCBI: entry; OMA: entry
Species	Human	Mouse
Entrez	4311	17380
Ensembl	ENSG00000196549	ENSMUSG00000027820
UniProt	P08473; Q3KQS6	Q61391
RefSeq (mRNA)	NM_000902; NM_007287; NM_007288; NM_007289; NM_001354642 NM_001354643; NM_001354644	NM_008604; NM_001289462; NM_001289463; NM_001357335
RefSeq (protein)	NP_000893; NP_009218; NP_009219; NP_009220; NP_001341571 NP_001341572; NP_001341573	NP_001276391; NP_001276392; NP_032630; NP_001344264
Location (UCSC)	Chr 3: 155.02 – 155.18 Mb	Chr 3: 63.15 – 63.29 Mb
PubMed search
- Wikidata
View/Edit Human	View/Edit Mouse

Neprilysin (/ˌnɛprɪˈlaɪsɪn/; also known as membrane metallo-endopeptidase (MME), neutral endopeptidase (NEP), cluster of differentiation 10 (CD10) and common acute lymphoblastic leukemia antigen (CALLA)) is an enzyme that in humans is encoded by the MME gene. Neprilysin is a zinc-dependent metalloprotease that cleaves peptides at the amino side of hydrophobic residues and inactivates several peptide hormones including glucagon, enkephalins, substance P, neurotensin, oxytocin, and bradykinin. It also degrades the amyloid beta peptide whose abnormal folding and aggregation in neural tissue has been implicated as a cause of Alzheimer's disease. Synthesized as a membrane-bound protein, the neprilysin ectodomain is released into the extracellular domain after it has been transported from the Golgi apparatus to the cell surface.

Neprilysin is expressed in a wide variety of tissues and is particularly abundant in the kidneys. It is also a common acute lymphocytic leukemia antigen that is an important cell surface marker in the diagnosis of human acute lymphocytic leukemia (ALL). This protein is present on leukemic cells of pre-B phenotype, which represent 85% of cases of ALL.

Hematopoietic progenitors expressing CD10 are considered "common lymphoid progenitors", which means they can differentiate into T, B or natural killer cells. CD10 is of use in hematological diagnosis since it is expressed by early B, pro-B and pre-B lymphocytes, and by lymph node germinal centers. Hematologic diseases in which it is positive include ALL, angioimmunoblastic T cell lymphoma, Burkitt lymphoma, chronic myelogenous leukemia in blast crisis (90%), diffuse large B-cell lymphoma (variable), follicular center cells (70%), hairy cell leukemia (10%), and myeloma (some). It tends to be negative in acute myeloid leukemia, chronic lymphocytic leukemia, mantle cell lymphoma, and marginal zone lymphoma. CD10 is found on non-T ALL cells, which derive from pre-B lymphocytes, and in germinal center-related non-Hodgkin lymphoma such as Burkitt lymphoma and follicular lymphoma, but not on leukemia cells or lymphomas, which originate in more mature B cells.

== Amyloid beta regulation ==
Neprilysin-deficient knockout mice show both Alzheimer's-like behavioral impairment and amyloid-beta deposition in the brain, providing strong evidence for the protein's association with the Alzheimer's disease process. Because neprilysin is thought to be the rate-limiting step in amyloid beta degradation, it has been considered a potential therapeutic target; compounds such as the peptide hormone somatostatin have been identified that increase the enzyme's activity level. Declining neprilysin activity with increasing age may also be explained by oxidative damage, known to be a causative factor in Alzheimer's disease; higher levels of inappropriately oxidized neprilysin have been found in Alzheimer's patients compared to cognitively normal elderly people.

== Signaling peptides ==
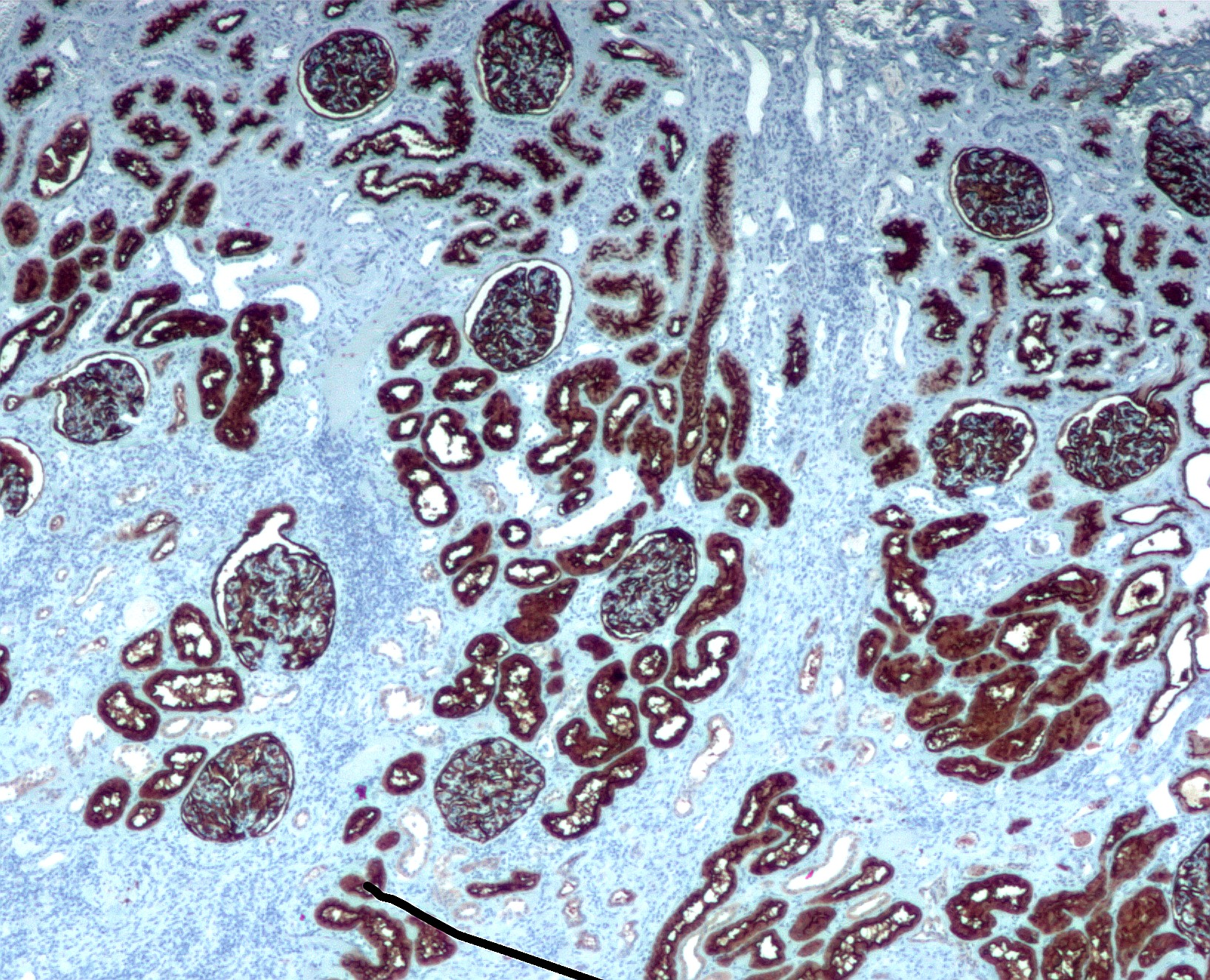
Neprilysin immunohistochemical staining of normal kidney.

Neprilysin is also associated with other biochemical processes, and is particularly highly expressed in kidney and lung tissues. Inhibitors have been designed with the aim of developing analgesic and antihypertensive agents that act by preventing neprilysin's activity against signaling peptides such as enkephalins, substance P, endothelin, and atrial natriuretic peptide.

Associations have been observed between neprilysin expression and various types of cancer; however, the relationship between neprilysin expression and carcinogenesis remains obscure. In cancer biomarker studies, the neprilysin gene is often referred to as CD10 or CALLA. In some types of cancer, such as metastatic carcinoma and some advanced melanomas, neprilysin is overexpressed; in other types, most notably lung cancers, neprilysin is downregulated, and thus unable to modulate the pro-growth autocrine signaling of cancer cells via secreted peptides such as mammalian homologs related to bombesin. Some plant extracts (methanol extracts of Ceropegia rupicola, Kniphofia sumarae, Plectranthus cf barbatus, and an aqueous extract of Pavetta longiflora) were found able to inhibit the enzymatic activity of neutral endopeptidase.

== Inhibitors ==
Inhibitors have been designed with the aim of developing analgesic and antihypertensive agents that act by preventing neprilysin's activity against signaling peptides such as enkephalins, substance P, endothelin, and atrial natriuretic peptide.

Some are intended to treat heart failure.

- Sacubitril/valsartan (Entresto/LCZ696), which has been tested against enalapril in patients with heart failure.
- Sacubitril (AHU-377), a prodrug which is a component of sacubitril/valsartan
- Sacubitrilat (LBQ657), the active form of sacubitril
- RB-101, an enkephalinase inhibitor, used in scientific research.
- UK-414,495
- Omapatrilat (dual inhibitor of NEP and angiotensin-converting enzyme) developed by BMS did not receive FDA approval due to angioedema safety concerns.
- Ecadotril
- Candoxatril

Other dual inhibitors of NEP with ACE/angiotensin receptor were (in 2003) being developed by pharmaceutical companies.

== Immunochemistry ==
CD10 is used in clinical pathology for diagnostic purpose.

=== In lymphomas and leukemias ===
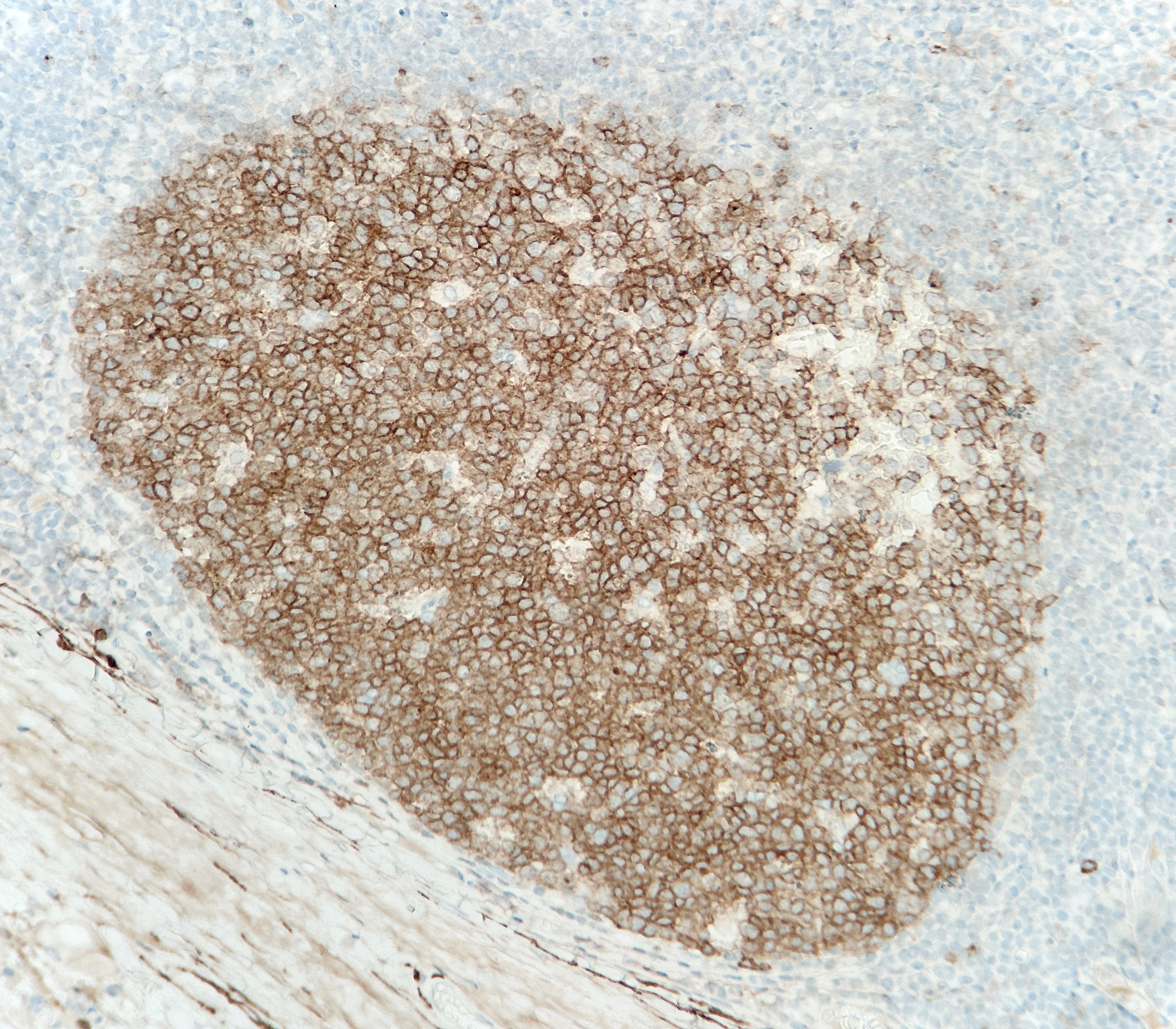
Immunohistochemistry of CD10 in the germinal center of a normal tonsil, conferring membranous staining of germinal-center B cells. The more uniformly dense CD10-positive portion toward the lower-left corresponds to the dark zone, rich in proliferating centroblasts. The scattered individual pale “holes” throughout are mostly nonstaining tingible-body macrophages. The upper-right part of the germinal center is the light zone, and generally appears less densely CD10-positive because it contains more follicular dendritic cells and T-follicular-helper cells among the CD10-positive centrocytes.

- Acute lymphoblastic leukemia (ALL) cells are CD10^{+}.
- Follicular lymphoma (follicle centre cell lymphoma) are CD10^{+}.
- Burkitt Lymphoma cells are CD10^{+}.
- CD10^{+} diffuse large B cell lymphoma (CD10^{+} DLBCL)
  - Marker for germinal center phenotype (CD10, HGAL, BCL6, CD38) are considered a favorable prognostic factor, but CD10^{+}, BCL2^{+}tumors could have poorer survival. For some authors, CD10 expression in DLBCL does not influence survival.
- Angioimmunoblastic T cell lymphoma (AITL) are CD10^{+} and distinguishes AITL from other T cell lymphomas (CD10^{−})
  - Some benign T cells can be CD10^{+}

=== In epithelial tumors ===
- Clear cell renal cell carcinoma (Clear cell RCC)
  - CD10^{+} distinguishes renal cell carcinoma, conventional type with eosinophilic morphology from its mimickers. Chromophobe carcinoma and oncocytoma are CD10^{−}.
- Pancreatic tumors
  - Solid pseudopapillary tumours are CD10^{+}.
  - CD10^{+} differentiates mucinous cystic neoplasms (CD10^{+}/CK20+) from intraductal papillary mucinous neoplasm of branch duct type (CD10^{−}/CK20-).
- Cutaneous tumors
  - CD10 may differentiate basal cell carcinoma (CD10 epithelial staining) from trichoblastoma (CD10 peritumoral stromal staining), basal cell carcinoma with follicular differentiation (CD10 stromal and epithelial staining) and squamous cell carcinoma (strong stromal staining).
  - CD10 differentiates CD10^{+} atypical fibroxanthoma from CD10^{−} spindle cell melanoma and sarcomatoid squamous cell carcinoma.
- Urothelial tumors express CD10 (42-67%).
  - CD10 expression is strongly correlated with high tumor grade and stage in urothelial carcinoma of the bladder. CD10 may be associated with tumor progression in bladder cancer pathogenesis.

=== In other tumors ===
CD10 in normal endometrium, being positive in endometrial stromal cells and negative in the endometrial lining (at top) and glands.

- CD10 expression might be one of the characteristics of müllerian system-derived neoplastic mesenchymal cells.
  - Normal endometrial stroma
  - Endometrial stromal sarcoma (ESS) are CD10^{+} (Smooth muscle tumors are usually CD10^{−}, but can be CD10^{+}
  - Malignant müllerian mixed tumor (MMMT)
  - Müllerian adenosarcoma
  - Uterine high-grade leiomyosarcoma
  - Uterine rhabdomyosarcoma
- Vascular tumors
  - Epithelioid hemangioendothelioma are mostly CD10^{+}.
  - Hemangioblastoma is usually CD10^{−} (metastatic renal cell carcinoma is CD10^{+})

== See also ==
- List of histologic stains that aid in diagnosis of cutaneous conditions
