= DPP3 =

Protein-coding gene in humans

Identifiers
- Aliases: DPP3, DPPIII, dipeptidyl peptidase 3
- External IDs: OMIM: 606818; MGI: 1922471; GeneCards: DPP3
Available structures
PDB	Ortholog search: PDBe RCSB
PDB	List of PDB id codes 3FVY, 3T6B, 3T6J, 5E2Q, 5EHH, 5E33, 5E3C, 5E3A, 5EGY
Enzyme activity
EC #	BRENDA	ExPASy	KEGG	MetaCyc
3.4.14.4	↗	↗	↗	↗

Gene location (Human)
Chr.	Chromosome 11 (human)
Band	11q13.2	Start	66,480,013 bp
Band	11q13.2	End	66,509,657 bp

Gene location (Mouse)
Chr.	Chromosome 19 (mouse)
Band	19|19 A	Start	4,957,257 bp
Band	19|19 A	End	4,978,315 bp
RNA expression pattern
Bgee	Human / Mouse (ortholog); Top expressed in: mucosa of transverse colon; oocyte; rectum; islet of Langerhans; secondary oocyte; granulocyte; mucosa of pharynx; mucosa of esophagus; stromal cell of endometrium; right adrenal gland / Top expressed in: yolk sac; lip; primitive streak; epiblast; esophagus; neural tube; lacrimal gland; right kidney; embryo; ventricular zone; More reference expression data
BioGPS	n/a
Gene ontology
Molecular function	zinc ion binding; peptidase activity; aminopeptidase activity; protein binding; hydrolase activity; metallopeptidase activity; dipeptidyl-peptidase activity; metal ion binding
Cellular component	plasma membrane; extracellular exosome; cytoplasm; nuclear speck; cytosol
Biological process	proteolysis
Sources:Amigo / QuickGO
Orthologs
Databases	NCBI: entry; OMA: entry
Species	Human	Mouse
Entrez	10072	75221
Ensembl	ENSG00000254986	ENSMUSG00000063904
UniProt	Q9NY33	Q99KK7
RefSeq (mRNA)	NM_130443; NM_001256670; NM_005700	NM_133803; NM_001360711
RefSeq (protein)	NP_001243599; NP_005691; NP_569710	NP_598564; NP_001347640
Location (UCSC)	Chr 11: 66.48 – 66.51 Mb	Chr 19: 4.96 – 4.98 Mb
PubMed search
- Wikidata
View/Edit Human	View/Edit Mouse

Dipeptidyl-peptidase 3 is an enzyme that in humans is encoded by the DPP3 gene.

This gene encodes a protein that is a member of the S9B family in clan SC of the serine proteases. This cytoplasmic protein binds a single zinc ion with its zinc-binding motif (HELLGH) and has post-proline dipeptidyl aminopeptidase activity, cleaving Xaa-Pro dipeptides from the N-termini of proteins. Increased activity of this protein is associated with endometrial and ovarian cancers. Alternate transcriptional splice variants have been characterized.

Dipeptidyl-peptidase 3 has been found to act as a myocardial depressant factor. Procizumab, a specific antibody for dipeptidyl-peptidase 3, was found to improve cardiac and renal function in a mouse model of heart failure. In human studies, higher levels of circulating DPP3 protein in cardiogenic shock patients indicated a more severe disease course, with a higher risk of refractory cardiogenic shock and death.

== Tissue distribution ==
Outside cells, DPP3, referred to as circulating DPP3 (cDPP3), is detected in various extracellular fluids, including cerebrospinal fluid, seminal plasma, and retroplacental plasma in low levels. In healthy adults, cDPP3 is present in plasma at a median concentration of 10 ng/mL, with an upper normal range of 22 ng/mL (97.5th percentile). However, in populations resembling ICU patients (e.g., older individuals with comorbidities), median cDPP3 levels of 14 ng/mL, with an upper range of 30 ng/mL, as defined by the 95th percentile.

== Function ==
DPP3 helps degrade a variety of bioactive peptides, including angiotensins and endogenous opioids like enkephalins and endomorphins. It does this by removing dipeptides from the end of each peptide molecule, whose length is typically in the range of 4 to 10 residues.

One of its best-characterized substrate is angiotensin II (Ang II), a key hormone produced by the body to increase blood pressure. Recent research indicates that DPP3 actively degrades Ang II in vivo, in particular leading to reduced blood pressure in hypertensive mice. Other studies suggest that DPP3 increases renal blood flow, and this appears to be due to reduced activation of Angiotensin II receptor type 1.

=== Oxidative stress ===
Within cells, DPP3 activates the KEAP1-NRF2 antioxidant pathway, which helps combat oxidative stress. It does this by competing with NRF2 to bind to KEAP1, releasing it to translocate to the nucleus. DPP3 is overexpressed in the brain under conditions of oxidative stress, such as loss of blood supply to the brain, and plays a significant role in reducing inflammation and cell death in those circumstances. Similarly, studies in mice suggest it has a role in reducing oxidative stress and damage to bones.

== Clinical significance ==
=== Role as a Biomarker ===
Blood DPP3 levels have been proposed as a biomarker for circulatory shock. This is because high levels of DPP3 in the blood are associated with reduce heart function, organ failure, and shock in critically ill patients.

=== Role in shock and circulatory failure ===
Beyond being a marker, there is some evidence that blood DPP3 levels are causally related to poor outcomes. During shock, the body increases production and/or release of vasoconstrictive hormones like Angiotensin II to try to restore blood pressure. However, DPP3 acts to degrade Angiotensins, so high levels may make it harder for the body to correct the problem.

=== As a drug target ===
DPP3 is being researched as the target of certain drugs intended to treat cardiac shock. The idea is to prevent DPP3 from breaking down Angiotensin II, and therefore make it easier for the body to restore blood pressure. Anti-DPP3 antibody treatments such as Procizumab have shown promising results in animal studies.
