= Thermolysin =

Class of enzymes

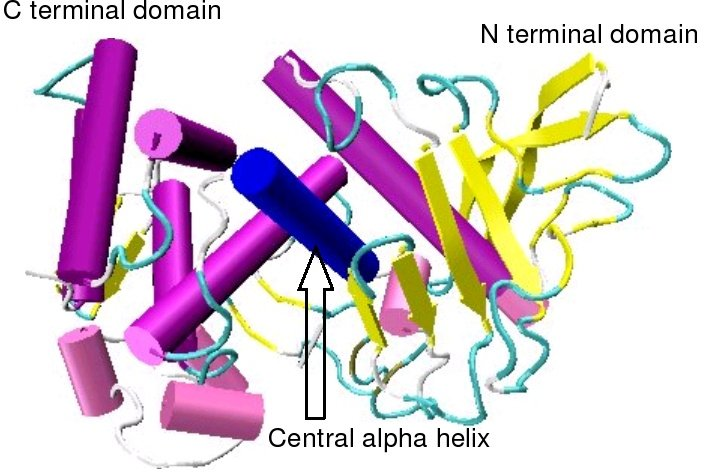
- Crystallographic structure of Bacillus thermoproteolyticus thermolysin.

Identifiers
- EC no.: 3.4.24.27
- CAS no.: 9073-78-3

Databases
- BRENDA: enzyme data
- ExPASy: NiceZyme view
- KEGG: enzyme entry
- MetaCyc: metabolic pathway
- Rhea: reactions
- PDB structures: RCSB PDB PDBe PDBsum
Search
- PMC: articles
- PubMed: articles
- NCBI: proteins

Thermolysin (EC 3.4.24.27, Bacillus thermoproteolyticus neutral proteinase, thermoase, thermoase Y10, TLN) is a thermostable neutral metalloproteinase enzyme produced by the Gram-positive bacteria Bacillus thermoproteolyticus. It requires one zinc ion for enzyme activity and four calcium ions for structural stability. Thermolysin specifically catalyzes the hydrolysis of peptide bonds containing hydrophobic amino acids. However thermolysin is also widely used for peptide bond formation through the reverse reaction of hydrolysis. Thermolysin is the most stable member of a family of metalloproteinases produced by various Bacillus species. These enzymes are also termed 'neutral' proteinases or thermolysin -like proteinases (TLPs).

== Synthesis ==
Like all bacterial extracellular proteases thermolysin is first synthesised by the bacterium as a pre-proenzyme. Thermolysin is synthesized as a pre-proenzyme consisting of a signal peptide 28 amino acids long, a pro-peptide 204 amino acids long and the mature enzyme itself 316 amino acids in length. The signal peptide acts as a signal for translocation of pre-prothermolysin to the bacterial cytoplasmic membrane. In the periplasm pre-prothermolysin is then processed into prothermolysin by a signal peptidase. The prosequence then acts as a molecular chaperone and leads to autocleavage of the peptide bond linking pro and mature sequences. The mature protein is then secreted into the extracellular medium.

== Structure ==
Thermolysin has a molecular weight of 34,600 Da. Its overall structure consists of two roughly spherical domains with a deep cleft running across the middle of the molecule separating the two domains. The secondary structure of each domain is quite different, the N-terminal domain consists of mostly beta pleated sheet, while the C-terminal domain is mostly alpha helical in structure. These two domains are connected by a central alpha helix, spanning amino acids 137–151.

In contrast to many proteins that undergo conformational changes upon heating and denaturation, thermolysin does not undergo any major conformational changes until at least 70 °C. The thermal stability of members of the TLP family is measured in terms of a T_{50} temperature. At this temperature incubation for 30 minutes reduces the enzymes activity by half. Thermolysin has a T_{50} value of 86.9 °C, making it the most thermo stable member of the TLP family. Studies on the contribution of calcium to thermolysin stability have shown that upon thermal inactivation a single calcium ion is released from the molecule. Preventing this calcium from originally binding to the molecule by mutation of its binding site, reduced thermolysin stability by 7 °C. However, while calcium binding makes a significant contribution to stabilising thermolysin, more crucial to stability is a small cluster of N-terminal domain amino acids located at the proteins surface. In particular a phenylalanine (F) at amino acid position 63 and a proline (P) at amino acid position 69 contribute significantly to thermolysin stability. Changing these amino acids to threonine (T) and alanine (A) respectively in a less stable thermolysin-like proteinase produced by Bacillus stearothermophillus (TLP-ste), results in individual reductions in stability of 7 °C (F63→T) and 6.3 °C (P69→A) and when combined a reduction in stability of 12.3 °C.

== Applications ==
- In the synthesis of aspartame, less bitter-tasting byproduct is produced when the reaction is catalyzed by thermolysin.
- Determining protein stability in cell lysate using the fast parallel proteolysis (FASTpp) assay.
