= Enkephalin =

Pentapeptide

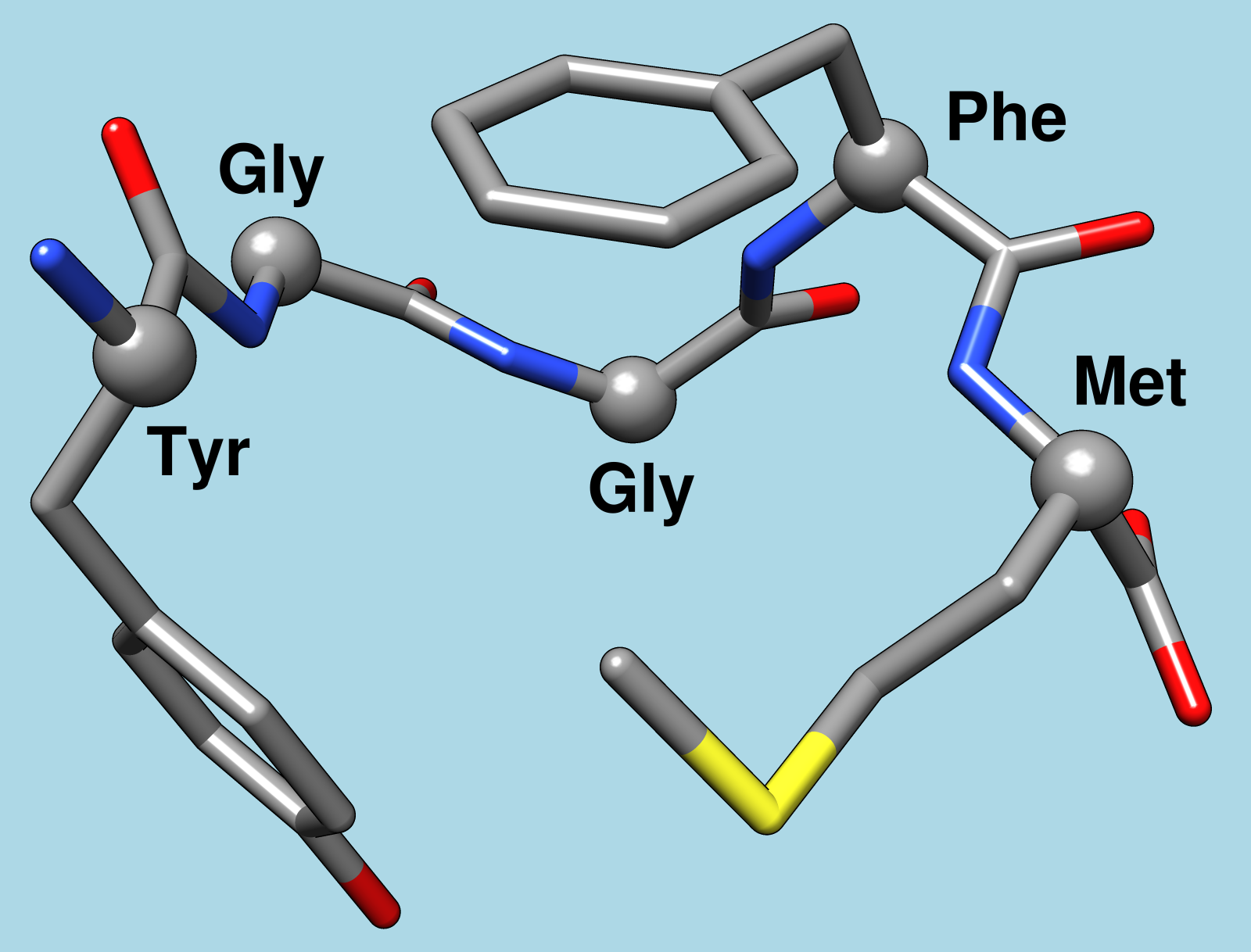
- Met-enkephalin 3D structure, alpha-carbons shown as balls and labeled by residue.

Identifiers
- Symbol: PENK
- NCBI gene: 5179
- HGNC: 8831
- OMIM: 131330
- RefSeq: NM_006211
- UniProt: P01210

Other data
- Locus: Chr. 8 q23-q24
Search for
- Structures: Swiss-model
- Domains: InterPro

An enkephalin is a pentapeptide involved in regulating nociception (pain sensation) in the body. The enkephalins are termed endogenous ligands, as they are internally derived (and therefore endogenous) and bind as ligands to the body's opioid receptors. Discovered in 1975, two forms of enkephalin have been found, one containing leucine ("leu"), and the other containing methionine ("met"). Both are products of the proenkephalin gene:

- Met-enkephalin is Tyr-Gly-Gly-Phe-Met.
- Leu-enkephalin is Tyr-Gly-Gly-Phe-Leu.

== Endogenous opioid peptides ==
There are three well-characterized families of opioid peptides produced by the body: enkephalins, β-endorphin, and dynorphins. The met-enkephalin peptide sequence is coded for by the enkephalin gene; the leu-enkephalin peptide sequence is coded for by both the enkephalin gene and the dynorphin gene. The proopiomelanocortin gene (POMC) also contains the met-enkephalin sequence on the N-terminus of β-endorphin, but the endorphin peptide is not processed into enkephalin.

== Effects on stress ==
Enkephalin is also considered a neuropeptide, which in the human body performs as an important signaling molecule in the brain. Enkephalins are found in high concentration in the brain as well as in the cells of adrenal medulla. In response to pain, norepinephrine, a hormone that is activated in fight-or-flight response, is released along with endorphins. A 2017 study indicates that this polypeptide may be linked to brain functioning during the stress response, especially in the hippocampus and prefrontal cortex. This research has suggested that, as part of the stress response, several met-enkephalin analogs have increased activity in the hippocampus, while leu-enkephalin analogs as well as somatostatins are downregulated during stress. Stressors may impact neuropeptides whose action is localized to a specific brain region.

== Enkephalin receptor ==
The receptors for enkephalin are the δ-opioid receptor (DOR) and μ-opioid receptor (MOR). Opioid receptors are a group of G-protein-coupled receptors, with other opioids as ligands as well. The other endogenous opioids are dynorphins (that bind to κ-opioid receptor), endorphins (MOR), endomorphins, and nociceptin-orphanin FQ. The opioid receptors are ~40% identical to somatostatin receptors (SSTRs).

== See also ==
- Endorphin
- Enkephalinase
- Opioid peptide
- Racecadotril
- RB-101
