= Proprotein convertase 2 =

Protein-coding gene in the species Homo sapiens

PCSK2

Identifiers
- Aliases: PCSK2, NEC 2, NEC-2, NEC2, PC2, SPC2, proprotein convertase subtilisin/kexin type 2
- External IDs: OMIM: 162151; MGI: 97512; HomoloGene: 37640; GeneCards: PCSK2; OMA:PCSK2 - orthologs

Gene location (Human)
Chr.	Chromosome 20 (human)
Band	20p12.1	Start	17,226,107 bp
Band	20p12.1	End	17,484,578 bp

Gene location (Mouse)
Chr.	Chromosome 2 (mouse)
Band	2 G1|2 70.89 cM	Start	143,388,076 bp
Band	2 G1|2 70.89 cM	End	143,658,205 bp
RNA expression pattern
Bgee	Human / Mouse (ortholog); Top expressed in: islet of Langerhans; Brodmann area 23; beta cell; right lobe of thyroid gland; Region I of hippocampus proper; endothelial cell; middle temporal gyrus; superior frontal gyrus; Brodmann area 46; orbitofrontal cortex / Top expressed in: islet of Langerhans; medial dorsal nucleus; habenula; primary motor cortex; mammillary body; olfactory tubercle; lateral geniculate nucleus; prefrontal cortex; medial geniculate nucleus; ventromedial nucleus; More reference expression data
BioGPS	n/a
Gene ontology
Molecular function	endopeptidase activity; peptidase activity; protein binding; serine-type peptidase activity; hydrolase activity; serine-type endopeptidase activity; protein-containing complex binding
Cellular component	perikaryon; membrane; transport vesicle; secretory granule; soma; dendrite; secretory granule lumen; cytoplasmic vesicle; extracellular space; nucleus; intracellular membrane-bounded organelle; extracellular region; neuron projection
Biological process	protein processing; insulin processing; protein autoprocessing; nervous system development; proteolysis; enkephalin processing; islet amyloid polypeptide processing; peptide hormone processing
Sources:Amigo / QuickGO
Orthologs
Species	Human	Mouse
Entrez	5126	18549
Ensembl	ENSG00000125851	ENSMUSG00000027419
UniProt	P16519	P21661
RefSeq (mRNA)	NM_002594; NM_001201528; NM_001201529	NM_008792
RefSeq (protein)	NP_001188457; NP_001188458; NP_002585	NP_032818
Location (UCSC)	Chr 20: 17.23 – 17.48 Mb	Chr 2: 143.39 – 143.66 Mb
PubMed search
- Wikidata
View/Edit Human	View/Edit Mouse

proprotein convertase 2

Identifiers
- EC no.: 3.4.21.94
- CAS no.: 130960-94-0

Databases
- IntEnz: IntEnz view
- BRENDA: BRENDA entry
- ExPASy: NiceZyme view
- KEGG: KEGG entry
- MetaCyc: metabolic pathway
- PRIAM: profile
- PDB structures: RCSB PDB PDBe PDBsum
- Gene Ontology: AmiGO / QuickGO
Search
- PMC: articles
- PubMed: articles
- NCBI: proteins

Proprotein convertase 2 (PC2) also known as prohormone convertase 2 or neuroendocrine convertase 2 (NEC2) is a serine protease and proprotein convertase PC2, like proprotein convertase 1 (PC1), is an enzyme responsible for the first step in the maturation of many neuroendocrine peptides from their precursors, such as the conversion of proinsulin to insulin intermediates. To generate the bioactive form of insulin (and many other peptides), a second step involving the removal of C-terminal basic residues is required; this step is mediated by carboxypeptidases E and/or D. PC2 plays only a minor role in the first step of insulin biosynthesis, but a greater role in the first step of glucagon biosynthesis compared to PC1. PC2 binds to the neuroendocrine protein named 7B2, and if this protein is not present, proPC2 cannot become enzymatically active. 7B2 accomplishes this by preventing the aggregation of proPC2 to inactivatable forms. The C-terminal domain of 7B2 also inhibits PC2 activity until it is cleaved into smaller inactive forms that lack carboxy-terminal basic residues. Thus, 7B2 is both an activator and an inhibitor of PC2. PC2 has been identified in a number of animals, including C. elegans.

In humans, proprotein convertase 2 is encoded by the PCSK2 gene. It is related to the bacterial enzyme subtilisin, and altogether there are 9 different subtilisin-like genes in mammals: furin, PACE4, PC4, PC5/6, PC7/8, PCSK9, and SKI1/S1P.
