= Proprotein convertase 1 =

PCSK1
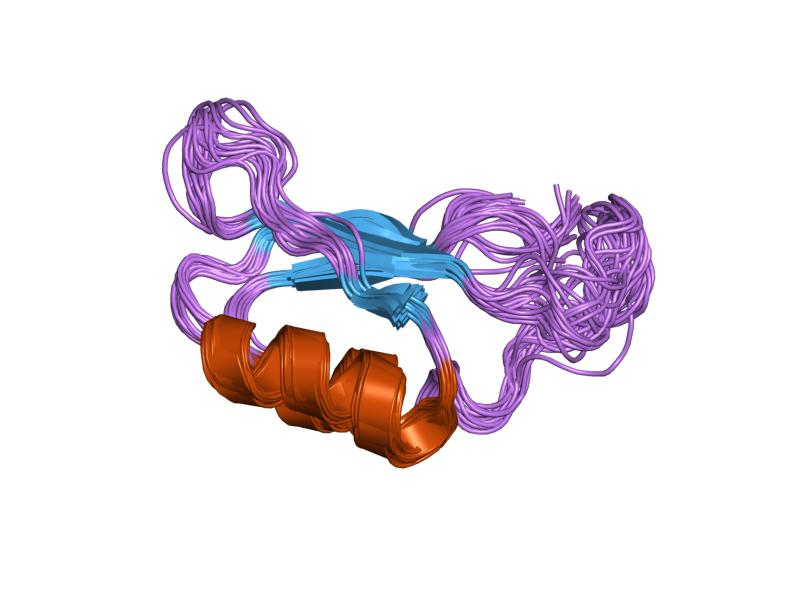
Available structures
| PDB | Ortholog search: PDBe RCSB |
| PDB | List of PDB id codes 1KN6, 2KDT, 2KE3 |

Identifiers
- Aliases: PCSK1, BMIQ12, NEC1, PC1, PC3, SPC3, proprotein convertase subtilisin/kexin type 1, PC1/3, PCSK1 gene
- External IDs: OMIM: 162150; MGI: 97511; HomoloGene: 379; GeneCards: PCSK1; OMA:PCSK1 - orthologs

Gene location (Human)
| Chr. | Chromosome 5 (human) |
| Band | 5q15 | Start | 96,390,333 bp |
| Band | 5q15 | End | 96,434,143 bp |

Gene location (Mouse)
| Chr. | Chromosome 13 (mouse) |
| Band | 13 C1|13 40.63 cM | Start | 75,237,945 bp |
| Band | 13 C1|13 40.63 cM | End | 75,282,980 bp |
RNA expression pattern
| Bgee | Human / Mouse (ortholog); Top expressed in: beta cell; postcentral gyrus; superior frontal gyrus; orbitofrontal cortex; Brodmann area 23; Brodmann area 46; endothelial cell; Brodmann area 10; primary visual cortex; testicle / Top expressed in: supraoptic nucleus; islet of Langerhans; pars distalis of adenohypophysis; lumbar spinal ganglion; dentate gyrus of hippocampal formation granule cell; paraventricular nucleus of hypothalamus; primary visual cortex; superior frontal gyrus; arcuate nucleus; central gray substance of midbrain; More reference expression data |
| BioGPS | n/a |
Gene ontology
| Molecular function | peptidase activity; serine-type peptidase activity; endopeptidase activity; hydrolase activity; serine-type endopeptidase activity; identical protein binding |
| Cellular component | secretory granule lumen; transport vesicle; cytoplasmic vesicle; extracellular space; membrane; neuron projection |
| Biological process | peptide biosynthetic process; cell-cell signaling; peptide hormone processing; proteolysis; protein processing |
Sources:Amigo / QuickGO
Orthologs
| Species | Human | Mouse |
| Entrez | 5122 | 18548 |
| Ensembl | ENSG00000175426 | ENSMUSG00000021587 |
| UniProt | P29120 | P63239 |
| RefSeq (mRNA) | NM_001177876; NM_000439; NM_001177875 | NM_013628 |
| RefSeq (protein) | NP_000430; NP_001171346 | NP_038656 |
| Location (UCSC) | Chr 5: 96.39 – 96.43 Mb | Chr 13: 75.24 – 75.28 Mb |
| PubMed search |
- Wikidata
| View/Edit Human | View/Edit Mouse |

proprotein convertase 1

Identifiers
- EC no.: 3.4.21.93
- CAS no.: 99676-46-7

Databases
- IntEnz: IntEnz view
- BRENDA: BRENDA entry
- ExPASy: NiceZyme view
- KEGG: KEGG entry
- MetaCyc: metabolic pathway
- PRIAM: profile
- PDB structures: RCSB PDB PDBe PDBsum
- Gene Ontology: AmiGO / QuickGO
Search
- PMC: articles
- PubMed: articles
- NCBI: proteins

Proprotein convertase 1, also known as prohormone convertase, prohormone convertase 3, or neuroendocrine convertase 1 and often abbreviated as PC1/3 is an enzyme that in humans is encoded by the PCSK1 gene. PCSK1 and PCSK2 differentially cleave proopiomelanocortin and they act together to process proinsulin and proglucagon in pancreatic islets.

== Function ==
PC1/3 is an enzyme that performs the proteolytic cleavage of prohormones to their intermediate (or sometimes completely cleaved) forms. It is present only in neuroendocrine cells such as brain, pituitary and adrenal, and most often cleaves after a pair of basic residues within prohormones but can occasionally cleave after a single arginine. It binds to a protein known as proSAAS, which also represents its endogenous inhibitor. PC1 is synthesized as a 99 kDa proform quickly converted to an 87 kDa major active form, which itself is nearly completely cleaved to a 66 kDa active form within neuroendocrine cells.

Proprotein convertase 1 is the enzyme largely responsible for the first step in the biosynthesis of insulin. Following the action of proprotein convertase 1, a carboxypeptidase is required to remove the basic residues from the processing intermediate and generate the bioactive form of insulin. Another prohormone convertase, proprotein convertase 2 plays a more minor role in the first step of insulin biosynthesis, but a greater role in the first step of glucagon biosynthesis. The knockout of proprotein convertase 1 is not lethal in mice or humans, most likely due to the presence of the second convertase, although mice lacking proprotein convertase 1 activity show a number of defects including slow growth.

Proprotein convertase 1 is a calcium (Ca^{2+}) activated serine endoprotease (meaning that a serine residue is part of the active site that hydrolyzes the peptide bond within the substrate). It is related to the bacterial enzyme known as subtilisin. There are nine subtilisin homologs in mammals; in addition to proprotein convertase 1 and 2, other members of this enzyme family include furin, PACE4, PC4, PC5/6, PC7/8, PCSK9, and SKI1/S1P.

Proprotein convertase 1 converts prorenin into renin.

== Clinical significance ==
Variants in the PCSK1 gene may be associated with obesity.

== See also ==
- Proprotein convertase subtilisin/kexin type 1 inhibitor
