= Proprotein convertase =

Class of enzymes

Proprotein convertases (PPCs) are a family of proteins that activate other proteins. Many proteins are inactive when they are first synthesized, because they contain chains of amino acids that block their activity. Proprotein convertases remove those chains and activate the protein. The prototypical proprotein convertase is furin. Proprotein convertases have medical significance, because they are involved in many important biological processes, such as cholesterol synthesis. Compounds called proprotein convertase inhibitors can block their action, and block the target proteins from becoming active. Many proprotein convertases, especially furin and PACE4, are involved in pathological processes such as viral infection, inflammation, hypercholesterolemia, and cancer, and have been postulated as therapeutic targets for some of these diseases.

== History ==
The phenomenon of prohormone conversion was discovered by Donald F. Steiner while examining the biosynthesis of insulin in 1967. At the same time, while conducting chemical sequencing of β-lipotrophic hormone (βLPH) with sheep pituitary glands Dr. Michel Chrétien determined the sequence of another hormone, melanocyte-stimulating hormone ( βMSH). This was the chemical evidence, at the level of primary protein sequence that peptide hormones could be found within larger protein molecules. The identity of the responsible enzymes was not clear for decades. In 1984, David Julius, working in the laboratory of Jeremy Thorner, identified the product of the Kex2 gene as responsible for processing of the alpha factor mating pheromone. Robert Fuller, working with Thorner, identified the partial sequence of the Kex2-homologous Furin gene in 1989. In 1990 human Kex2-homologous genes were cloned by the Steiner group, Nabil Seidah and co-workers, Wim J.M. van de Ven and co-workers, Yukio Ikehara and co-workers, Randal Kaufman and co-workers, Gary Thomas and co-workers, and Kazuhisa Nakayama and co-workers.

== Furin ==
One of the most well-known PPCs is furin. Furin is a serine endoprotease which cleaves protein precursors carboxyterminal of basic residues in motifs such as Arg–X–X–Arg and Lys/Arg–Arg. Cleavage usually results in activation of the proprotein but can also inactivate or modify the activity. Therefore, it is not surprising that it plays a major role in many physiological processes and pathologies, including cancer. Some of its substrates are: proparathyroid hormone, transforming growth factor beta 1 precursor, proalbumin, pro-beta-secretase, membrane type-1 matrix metalloproteinase, beta subunit of pro-nerve growth factor and von Willebrand factor. A furin-like pro-protein convertase has been implicated in the processing of RGMc (also called hemojuvelin). Both the Ganz and Rotwein groups demonstrated that furin-like proprotein convertases (PPC) are responsible for conversion of 50 kDa HJV to a 40 kDa protein with a truncated COOH-terminus, at a conserved polybasic RNRR site. This suggests a potential mechanism to generate the soluble forms of HJV/hemojuvelin (s-hemojuvelin) found in the blood of rodents and humans.

== Prohormone convertases ==
The two proprotein convertases that specialize in the processing of the precursors of peptide hormones and neuropeptides are also known in the field as "prohormone convertases". Both "prohormone convertase" and "proprotein convertase" are interchangeably abbreviated as "PC". PC1 (also known as PC3 and commonly referred to as PC1/3) and PC2 are the primary enzymes involved in the processing of the bioactive peptides precursors at paired basic residues. PC1/3 and PC2 do not directly produce most neuropeptides and peptide hormones, but instead generate intermediates that contain C-terminal extensions of lysine and/or arginine residues; these are subsequently removed by carboxypeptidase E.

== Clinical significance ==
Current scientific evidence indicates that both up- and down-regulation of the expression of proprotein convertases are part of the multiple changes occurring in gynecological tumors. PCs activate crucial substrates implicated in the progression of gynecological cancers, including adhesion molecules, metalloproteinases, and viral proteins. Experimental evidences suggest that careful targeting of PCs in gynecological cancer may represent a feasible strategy to deter tumor progression. Variants of PCSK9 can reduce or increase circulating cholesterol. Furin plays a role in the activation of several different virus proteins, and inhibitors of furin have been explored as antiviral agents.

== Biochemical structure ==
Kex2 was first purified and characterized by Charles Brenner and Robert Fuller in 1992. The Kex2 crystal structure was solved by a group led by Dagmar Ringe, Robert Fuller and Gregory Petsko. That of Furin was determined by a group led by Manual Than and Wolfram Bode. The key features of Kex2 and Furin are a subtilisin-related catalytic domain, a specificity pocket that requires the amino acid amino terminal to the scissile bond to be arginine for rapid acylation, and a P-domain carboxy-terminal to the subtilisin domain, which is required for biosynthesis.

== PCSK subtypes ==
To date there are 9 PCSKs with varying functions and tissue distributions. Often, due to similar times of discovery from different groups the same PCSKs have acquired multiple names. In an attempt to alleviate confusion, there is a trend towards using the PCSK prefix with the appropriate number suffix.

Current PCSK nomenclature	Other common names
PCSK1	PC1, PC3 (new name: PC1/3)
PCSK2	PC2
PCSK3	Furin, Pace, PC1
PCSK4	PC4
PCSK5	PC5, PC6 (new name: PC5/6)
PCSK6	PACE4
PCSK7	PC7, PC8
PCSK8	Site 1 Protease, S1P, SKI
PCSK9	NARC-1
