= David Julius =

American physiologist and Nobel laureate 2021

- Julius in 2022
- Born: November 4, 1955 (age 71); New York City, U.S.
- Education: Massachusetts Institute of Technology (BS); University of California, Berkeley (MS, PhD); Columbia University (post-doctoral training)
- Spouse: Holly Ingraham
- Awards: Nobel Prize in Physiology or Medicine (2021); Breakthrough Prize in Life Sciences (2020); W. Alden Spencer Award (2007)
- Scientific career
- Fields: Physiology; Biochemistry; Neuroscience
- Workplaces: University of California, San Francisco
- Thesis: Protein processing and secretion in yeast: biosynthesis of α-factor mating pheromone (1984)
- Doctoral advisor: Jeremy Thorner; Randy Schekman
- Other academic advisors: Richard Axel; Alexander Rich

David Jay Julius (born November 4, 1955) is an American physiologist and Nobel Prize laureate known for his work on molecular mechanisms of pain sensation and heat, including the characterization of the TRPV1 and TRPM8 receptors that detect capsaicin, menthol, and temperature. He is a professor at the University of California, San Francisco.

Julius won the 2010 Shaw Prize in Life Science and Medicine and the 2020 Breakthrough Prize in Life Sciences. In 2020 he was awarded The Kavli Prize, and in 2021 the Nobel Prize in Physiology or Medicine jointly with Ardem Patapoutian.

== Early life and education ==
Julius was born to an Ashkenazi Jewish family (from Russia) in Brighton Beach, Brooklyn, New York City, where he attended Abraham Lincoln High School. He earned his undergraduate degree from Massachusetts Institute of Technology in 1977. He attained his doctorate from University of California, Berkeley in 1984, under joint supervision of Jeremy Thorner and Randy Schekman, where he identified Kex2 as the founding member of furin-like proprotein convertases. In 1989, he completed his post-doctoral training with Richard Axel at Columbia University where he cloned and characterized the serotonin 1c receptor.

While at Berkeley and Columbia, Julius became interested in how psilocybin mushrooms and lysergic acid diethylamide work, which led him to look more broadly into how things from nature interact with human receptors.

== Research career ==
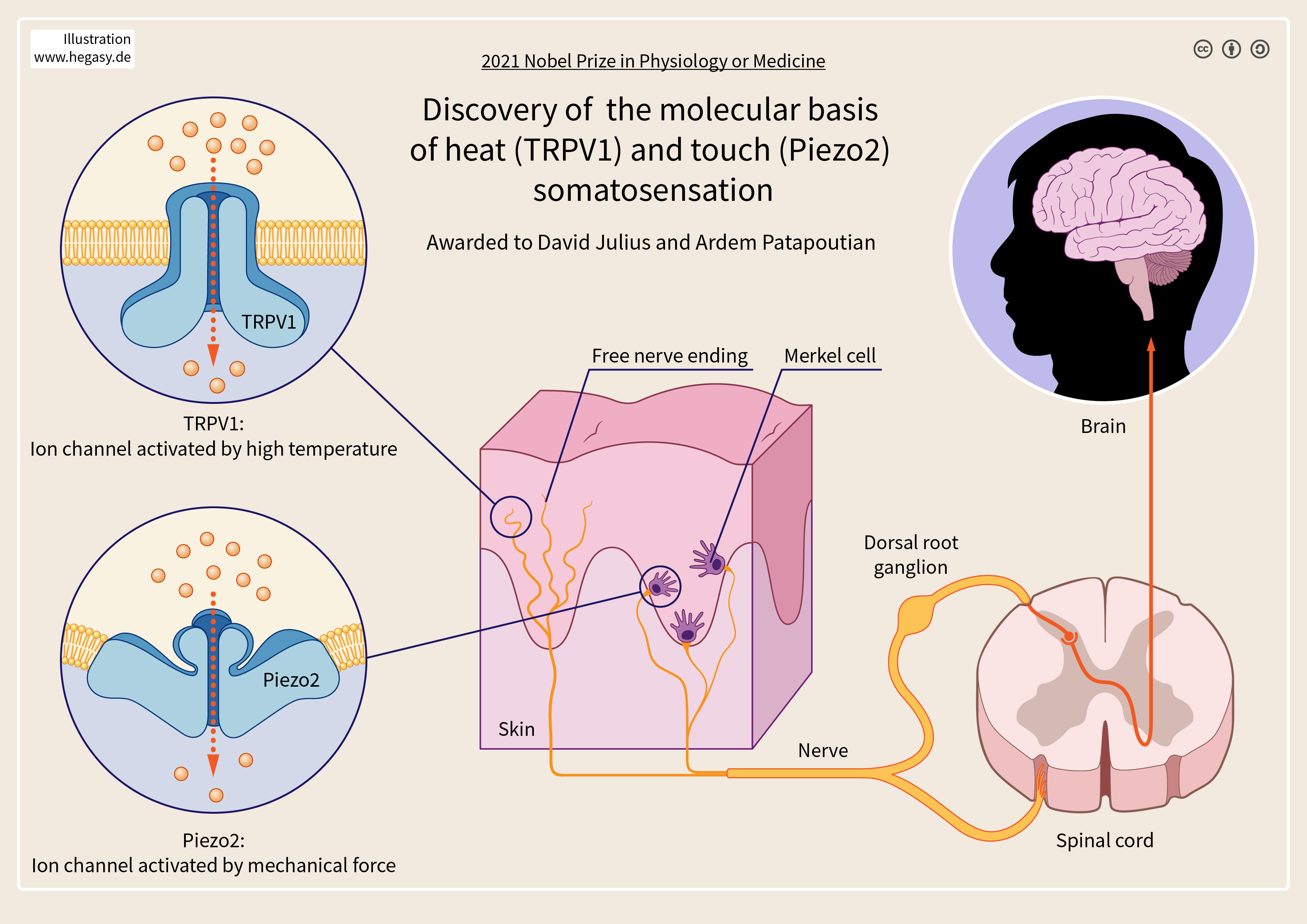
Nobel Prize work

He started his career as faculty at the University of California, San Francisco in 1989. In 1997, Julius's lab cloned and characterized TRPV1 which is the receptor that detects capsaicin, the chemical in chili peppers that makes them "hot". They found that TRPV1 also detects noxious heat (thermoception). TRPV1 is part of a large family of structurally related TRP (transient receptor potential) cation channels. Animals that lack TRPV1 (using genetic knockouts of the protein) lose sensitivity to noxious heat and capsaicin.

Julius's lab has also cloned and characterized TRPM8 (CMR1) and TRPA1, both members of the TRP superfamily. They demonstrated that TRPM8 detects menthol and cooler temperatures and TRPA1 detects mustard oil (allyl isothiocyanate). These observations suggested that TRP channels detect a range of temperatures and chemicals. David Julius's lab has also made contributions to the study of nociception by discovering toxins that modulate these channels, describing unique adaptations of the channels in diverse species and solving the cryo-EM structures of numerous channels.

Julius’ laboratory also made pioneering contributions to the discovery of purinergic receptors, both the P2Y class of G protein-coupled receptors, and the P2X class of ligand-gated ion channels. This included the cloning of P2Y12, the receptor for clopidogrel and related antiplatelet medications that are widely used to reduce the risk of heart disease and stroke. The group also cloned the 5HT3 receptor, a serotonin-activated ion channel and the target for drugs such as ondansentron for the treatment of nausea and vomiting.

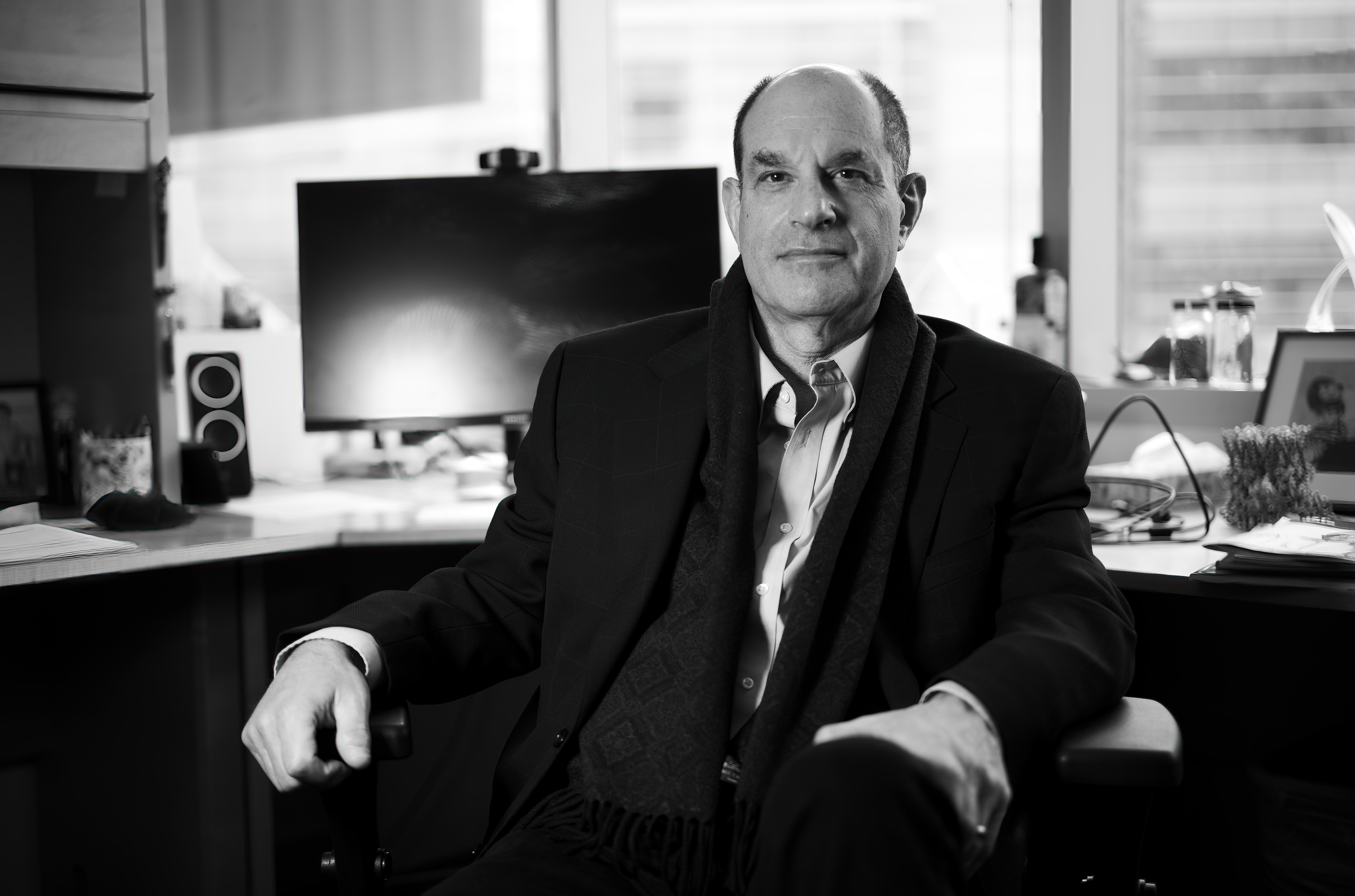
Julius in 2022

From 2007 to 2020 Julius served as the editor of the peer-reviewed journal the Annual Review of Physiology.

== Awards ==
In 2000, Julius was awarded the inaugural Perl-UNC Neuroscience Prize for his work on cloning the capsaicin receptor. In 2006, he was honored be The International Prize for Translational Neuroscience of the Max Planck Society. In 2007, Julius received the W. Alden Spencer Award by the College of Physicians and Surgeons, the Department of Neuroscience, and The Kavli Institute for Brain Science at Columbia University, and the Julius Axelrod Prize of the Society for Neuroscience. In 2008, he held the Jack Cooper Lecture at Yale School of Medicine. In 2010, he won the Shaw Prize for his work identifying the ion channels involved in various aspects of nociception. He received the Passano Award in the same year. In 2014, he was honored by Johnson & Johnson with the Dr. Paul Janssen Award for Biomedical Research for discovering the molecular basis for pain and thermosensation. In 2017, he won the Gairdner Foundation International Award and the HFSP Nakasone Award. He has also been awarded the 2010 Prince of Asturias Prize for Technical and Scientific Research, the 2020 Breakthrough Prize in Life Sciences, and the 2020 Kavli Prize in Neuroscience (together with Ardem Patapoutian) and the 2020 BBVA Foundation Frontiers of Knowledge Award.

In 2021, he was awarded the Nobel Prize in Physiology or Medicine jointly with Ardem Patapoutian for their discoveries of receptors for temperature and touch.

In 2022, Julius was awarded the UCSF Medal by the University of California, San Francisco. In 2023, he received the John J. Bonica Award, by the American Society of Regional Anesthesia and Pain Medicine (ASRA). In 2025, Julius was awarded an Honorary Membership in the Society of Toxicology.

== See also ==
- List of Jewish Nobel laureates
