= IMCY-0098 =

Experimental drug

Legal status
- Legal status: Investigational

Identifiers
- IUPAC name: H-His-Cys-Pro-Tyr-Cys-Ser-Leu-Gln-Pro-Leu-Ala-Leu-Glu-Gly-Ser-Leu-Gln-Lys-Arg-Gly-NH2
- UNII: 7M9GZF9VTT

Chemical and physical data
- Formula: C_{95}H_{157}N_{29}O_{28}S_{2}
- Molar mass: 2217.60 g·mol^{−1}

IMCY-0098 is a peptide immunotherapy based on proinsulin and developed by Imcyse to reduce the progression of type 1 diabetes.
