= Holly Ingraham =

American physiologist

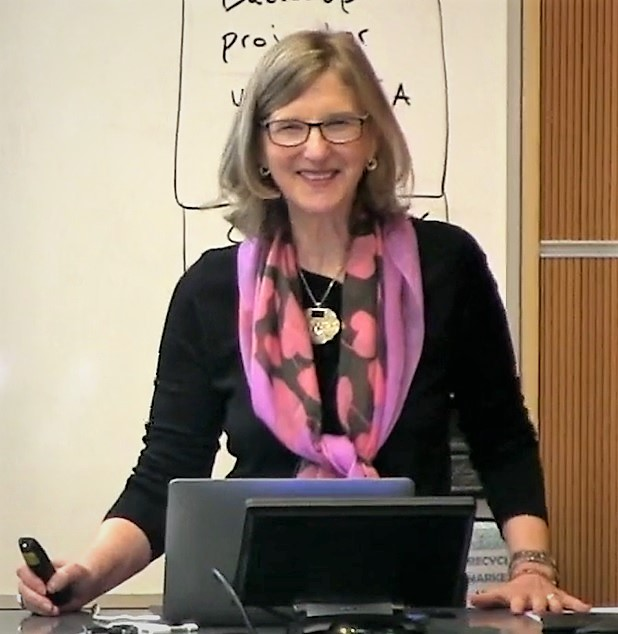
- Ingraham lecturing at the University of Wisconsin, Madison, in 2019
- Born: Holly Ann Ingraham; 1952 (age 73–74); Northern California
- Education: University of California, San Diego
- Spouse: David Julius
- Children: Philip A. Julius
- Scientific career
- Workplaces: University of California, San Francisco
- Thesis: Effects of 5-fluorodeoxyuridine on intracellular metabolism of deoxyuridylate (1981)
- Website: Ingraham Lab

Holly Ann Ingraham (born 1952) is an American physiologist who is the Herzstein Professor of Molecular Physiology at the University of California, San Francisco. She studies women's health, in particular, sex-dependent central regulation of female metabolism and physiology. She was Elected to the American Association for the Advancement of Science in 2012, the American Academy of Arts and Sciences in 2019, and the National Academy of Sciences in 2021.

== Early life and education ==
Ingraham grew up in Northern California. As a child she was gifted a Bausch & Lomb microscope and spent her spare time investigating all the objects she could find close to her home. She started her scientific career as an undergraduate student at the University of California, San Diego (UCSD), where she majored in biology and psychology. Ingraham earned her doctorate at UCSD.

== Research and career ==
Ingraham studies hormone-responsive nodes in the brain. In particular, she is interested in estrogen's signalling in the brain and how this impacts female metabolism. She has studied the influence of estrogen-sensitive brain cells on bone density. Over two million people suffer from osteoporosis, with post-menopausal women being particularly vulnerable to the condition. The declining levels of estrogen after menopause can cause bones to become increasingly porous and fragile. Ingraham manipulated neurons in the hypothalamus, and found that genetically deleting the estrogen receptor caused female animals to gain weight and become less active. She identified that these heavier mice had increases in bone density of up to 800%. Together with her collaborators, Ingraham investigated estrogen-sensitive brain cells in the arcuate nucleus, and proposed that estrogen typically signals these neurons to slow bone growth. By deleting these receptors, Ingraham showed that it was possible to reduce this shift. The same was not true in male mice, where manipulating the estrogen signalling had no impact. In female mice that were already suffering from osteoporosis, Ingraham showed that bone density could increase by around 50% in a few weeks. Ingraham has investigated other estrogen-sensitive neurons outside the hypothalamus and how declining health is associated with the depletion of hormones.

Ingraham is interested in the development of the ventromedial nucleus of the hypothalamus, the neuroendocrine centre of the brain. She identified that the herbicide atrazine can activate gene networks. Beyond the brain, Ingraham has studied sex-specific differences in gut-brain signalling pathways, in an effort to understand why women are more susceptible to intestinal visceral pain syndromes.

Another primary focus of Ingraham's academic activities is directed towards the most vulnerable population in our nation's biomedical educational pipeline – women and minority postdoctoral fellows. As such, she serves as the director of the NIGMS-IRACDA Program at UCSF, which provides a cohort of 15–20 scholars with individualized mentoring and career development plans for future success at R1 and R3 institutions.

== Awards and honors ==
- 2002 Brook Byers Basic Science Award
- 2006 Herzstein Distinguished Investigator in Molecular Physiology
- 2012 Elected to the American Association for the Advancement of Science
- 2017 Chancellor's Award Martin Luther King, Jr. Leadership Award
- 2018 Joseph Larner Memorial Lecture in Pharmacology
- 2019 Elected to the American Academy of Arts and Sciences
- 2021 Elected to the National Academy of Sciences
- 2023 Recipient of Edwin B. Astwood Award for Outstanding Research in Basic Science

== Personal life ==
Ingraham is married to David Julius, professor and chair of physiology at UCSF and winner of 2021 Nobel Prize in Physiology or Medicine. She and David Julius have a son.

== Selected publications ==
- Holly A. Ingraham; Harry J. Mangalam; Harry P. Elsholtz; Sarah E. Flynn; Chijen R. Lin; Donna M. Simmons; Larry Swanson; Michael G. Rosenfeld (1 November 1988). "A tissue-specific transcription factor containing a homeodomain specifies a pituitary phenotype". Cell. 55 (3): 519–529. doi:10.1016/0092-8674(88)90038-4. ISSN 0092-8674. PMID 2902928. Wikidata Q46821977.
- Xi He; Maurice N. Treacy; Donna M. Simmons; Holly A. Ingraham; Larry W. Swanson; Michael G. Rosenfeld (6 July 1989). "Expression of a large family of POU-domain regulatory genes in mammalian brain development". Nature. 340 (6228): 35–41. Bibcode:1989Natur.340...35H. doi:10.1038/340035a0. ISSN 1476-4687. PMID 2739723. Wikidata Q28277007. (erratum)
- Mark W Nachtigal; Yoshifumi Hirokawa; Debra L Enyeart-VanHouten; John N Flanagan; Gary D Hammer; Holly A Ingraham (1 May 1998). "Wilms' tumor 1 and Dax-1 modulate the orphan nuclear receptor SF-1 in sex-specific gene expression". Cell. 93 (3): 445–454. doi:10.1016/s0092-8674(00)81172-1. ISSN 0092-8674. PMID 9590178. Wikidata Q24316570.
