= HFE2 =

HFE2 can refer to:

- Hemojuvelin
- HAMP
