= Iris Lindberg =

Woman Scientist

- Education: University of Wisconsin, Madison
- Scientific career
- Thesis: Studies on enkephalin distribution and release in rat brain (1980)

Iris Lindberg is a professor at the University of Maryland, Baltimore known for her contributions to the field of molecular biology, particularly in peptide biosynthesis and neurodegenerative diseases. She was elected a fellow of the American Association for the Advancement of Science in 2018.

== Education ==
Lindberg received her A.B. in Biochemistry from the University of California at Berkeley in June 1975. She pursued her graduate studies at the University of Wisconsin Medical School, earning her Ph.D. in Pharmacology in December 1980.

== Career ==
From 1981 to 1984 Lindberg was a staff fellow at the Laboratory of Preclinical Pharmacology through the National Institute of Mental Health. In 1984, Lindberg was appointed as an assistant professor in the Department of Biochemistry and Molecular Biology at Louisiana State University Medical School, where she rose through the academic ranks, achieving tenure as an associate professor and later full professor in 1994. In 2007, Lindberg transitioned to the University of Maryland School of Medicine as a professor in the Department of Anatomy and Neurobiology.

== Research ==
Lindberg is known for her work on prohormone convertases and their role in peptide processing, and the molecular mechanisms underlying neurodegenerative disorders. Lindberg showed the first crystal structure of the catalytic and P domain of furin, demonstrating its potential function and substrate specificity. She has also examined the molecular mechanisms underlying Alzheimer's and Parkinson's diseases.

== Selected publications ==
- Lindberg, Iris (1991-10-01). "Minireview: The New Eukaryotic Precursor Processing Proteinases". Molecular Endocrinology. 5 (10): 1361–1365. doi:10.1210/mend-5-10-1361. ISSN 0888-8809. PMID 1775127.
- Cameron, Angus; Appel, Jon; Houghten, Richard A.; Lindberg, Iris (2000-11-24). "Polyarginines Are Potent Furin Inhibitors *". Journal of Biological Chemistry. 275 (47): 36741–36749. doi:10.1074/jbc.M003848200. ISSN 0021-9258. PMID 10958789.
- Hoshino, Akina; Lindberg, Iris (2012). Peptide Biosynthesis. San Rafael: Morgan & Claypool Publishers. ISBN 978-1-61504-364-4.
- Lindberg, Iris; Shorter, James; Wiseman, R. Luke; Chiti, Fabrizio; Dickey, Chad A.; McLean, Pamela J. (2015-10-14). "Chaperones in Neurodegeneration". The Journal of Neuroscience. 35 (41): 13853–13859. doi:10.1523/JNEUROSCI.2600-15.2015. ISSN 0270-6474. PMC 4604223. PMID 26468185.

== Honors and awards ==
Lindberg was elected a fellow of the American Association for the Advancement of Science in 2018.
