= S1P =

S1P may refer to:

- Site-1 Protease
- Sphingosine-1-Phosphate
