= Kexin =

Prohormone-processing protease

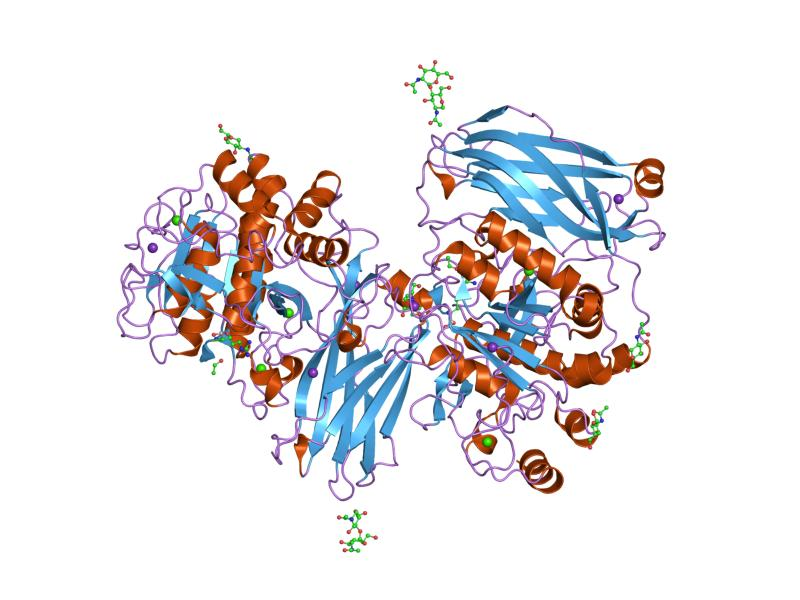
- 1R64

Identifiers
- Organism: Saccharomyces cerevisiae
- Symbol: KEX2
- Entrez: 855483
- HomoloGene: 22495
- RefSeq (mRNA): NM_001183076.1
- RefSeq (Prot): NP_014161.1
- UniProt: D6W0V5

Other data
- EC number: 3.4.21.61
- Chromosome: XIV: 0.2 - 0.21 Mb
Search for
- Structures: Swiss-model
- Domains: InterPro

Kexin (EC 3.4.21.61) is a prohormone-processing protease, specifically a yeast serine peptidase, found in the budding yeast (S. cerevisiae). It catalyzes the cleavage of -Lys-Arg- and -Arg-Arg- bonds to process yeast alpha-factor pheromone and killer toxin precursors. The human homolog is PCSK4. It is a family of subtilisin-like peptidases. Even though there are a few prokaryote kexin-like peptidases, all kexins are eukaryotes. The enzyme is encoded by the yeast gene KEX2, and usually referred to in the scientific community as Kex2p. It shares structural similarities with the bacterial protease subtilisin. The first mammalian homologue of this protein to be identified was furin. In the mammal, kexin-like peptidases function in creating and regulating many differing proproteins.

== Nomenclature ==
The enzyme is also known as yeast KEX2 protease, proteinase yscF, prohormone-processing endoprotease, paired-basic endopeptidase, yeast cysteine proteinase F, paired-basic endopeptidase, andrenorphin-Gly-generating enzyme, endoproteinase Kex2p, gene KEX2 dibasic proteinase, Kex 2p proteinase, Kex2 endopeptidase, Kex2 endoprotease, Kex2 endoproteinase, Kex2 protease, proteinase Kex2p, Kex2-like precursor protein processing endoprotease, prohormone-processing KEX2 proteinase, prohormone-processing proteinase, proprotein convertase, protease KEX2, Kex2 proteinase, and Kex2-like endoproteinase.
