= Repulsive guidance molecule B =

Protein-coding gene in the species Homo sapiens

RGMB

Identifiers
- Aliases: RGMB, DRAGON, repulsive guidance molecule family member b, repulsive guidance molecule BMP co-receptor b
- External IDs: OMIM: 612687; MGI: 1916049; GeneCards: RGMB
Available structures
PDB	Ortholog search: PDBe RCSB
PDB	List of PDB id codes 4BQ6, 4BQ7, 4BQ8, 4UHZ, 4UI0, 4UI2

Gene location (Human)
Chr.	Chromosome 5 (human)
Band	5q15	Start	98,768,650 bp
Band	5q15	End	98,798,643 bp

Gene location (Mouse)
Chr.	Chromosome 17 (mouse)
Band	17|17 A2	Start	15,803,188 bp
Band	17|17 A2	End	15,831,039 bp
RNA expression pattern
Bgee	Human / Mouse (ortholog); Top expressed in: mucosa of ileum; pylorus; skin of arm; skin of thigh; tibialis anterior muscle; cardia; cardiac muscle tissue of right atrium; rectum; deltoid muscle; spinal ganglia / Top expressed in: Rostral migratory stream; otolith organ; utricle; Paneth cell; lateral habenular nucleus; paraventricular nucleus of thalamus; medial habenular nucleus; spinal ganglia; lumbar spinal ganglion; sciatic nerve; More reference expression data
BioGPS	n/a
Gene ontology
Molecular function	coreceptor activity; identical protein binding; protein binding
Cellular component	membrane raft; anchored component of membrane; plasma membrane; membrane; endoplasmic reticulum-Golgi intermediate compartment; anchored component of plasma membrane
Biological process	positive regulation of transcription, DNA-templated; signal transduction; BMP signaling pathway; cell adhesion
Sources:Amigo / QuickGO
Orthologs
Databases	NCBI: entry; OMA: entry
Species	Human	Mouse
Entrez	285704	68799
Ensembl	ENSG00000174136	ENSMUSG00000048027
UniProt	Q6NW40	Q7TQ33
RefSeq (mRNA)	NM_001012761; NM_173670; NM_001366508; NM_001366509; NM_001366510 NM_001366511	NM_178615
RefSeq (protein)	NP_001012779; NP_001353437; NP_001353438; NP_001353439; NP_001353440	NP_848730
Location (UCSC)	Chr 5: 98.77 – 98.8 Mb	Chr 17: 15.8 – 15.83 Mb
PubMed search
- Wikidata
View/Edit Human	View/Edit Mouse

Repulsive guidance molecule B (RGMb), also known as DRAGON (DRG11-responsive axonal guidance and outgrowth of neurite), is a bone morphogenetic protein (BMP) co-receptor of the repulsive guidance molecule family. In humans this protein is encoded by the RGMB gene.

== Function ==
RGMB is a glycosylphosphatidylinositol (GPI)-anchored member of the repulsive guidance molecule family (see also RGMA and RGMC) and contributes to the patterning of the developing nervous system.

== Clinical significance ==
There is a potential association between RGMs and cancer bone metastasis, as RGMs coordinate bone morphogenetic protein (BMP) signaling. RGMB may act as a negative regulator in vitro in breast cancer and prostate cancer through BMP signalling. Furthermore, aberrant expression of RGMs was indicated in breast cancer. The perturbed expression was associated with disease progression and poor prognosis.
