= Repulsive guidance molecule =

Protein family

Repulsive guidance molecules (RGMs) are members of a three gene family (in vertebrates) composed of RGMa, RGMb, and RGMc (also called hemojuvelin). RGMa has been implicated to play an important role in the developing brain and in the scar tissue that forms after a brain injury. For example, RGMa helps guide retinal ganglion cell (RGC) axons to the tectum in the midbrain. It has also been demonstrated that after induced spinal cord injury RGMa accumulates in the scar tissue around the lesion. Further research has shown that RGMa is an inhibitor of axonal outgrowth. Taken together, these findings highlight the importance of RGMa in axonal guidance and outgrowth.

== Family members ==
RGM domain family, member A

Identifiers
- Symbol: RGMA
- Alt. symbols: RGM
- NCBI gene: 56963
- HGNC: 30308
- OMIM: 607362
- RefSeq: NM_020211
- UniProt: Q96B86

Other data
- Locus: Chr. 15 q26.1
Search for
- Structures: Swiss-model
- Domains: InterPro

RGM domain family, member B

Identifiers
- Symbol: RGMB
- Alt. symbols: DRAGON
- NCBI gene: 285704
- HGNC: 26896
- OMIM: 612687
- RefSeq: NM_173670
- UniProt: Q6NW40

Other data
- Locus: Chr. 5 q21.1
Search for
- Structures: Swiss-model
- Domains: InterPro

hemochromatosis type 2

Identifiers
- Symbol: HFE2
- Alt. symbols: RGMC, HJV, hemojuvelin
- NCBI gene: 148738
- HGNC: 4887
- OMIM: 608374
- RefSeq: NM_145277
- UniProt: Q6ZVN8

Other data
- Locus: Chr. 1 q21.2
Search for
- Structures: Swiss-model
- Domains: InterPro
