= PACS1 =

Protein-coding gene in the species Homo sapiens

Identifiers
- Aliases: PACS1, MRD17, phosphofurin acidic cluster sorting protein 1, SHMS
- External IDs: OMIM: 607492; MGI: 1277113; GeneCards: PACS1

Gene location (Human)
Chr.	Chromosome 11 (human)
Band	11q13.1-q13.2	Start	66,070,272 bp
Band	11q13.1-q13.2	End	66,244,744 bp

Gene location (Mouse)
Chr.	Chromosome 19 (mouse)
Band	19|19 A	Start	5,183,186 bp
Band	19|19 A	End	5,323,147 bp
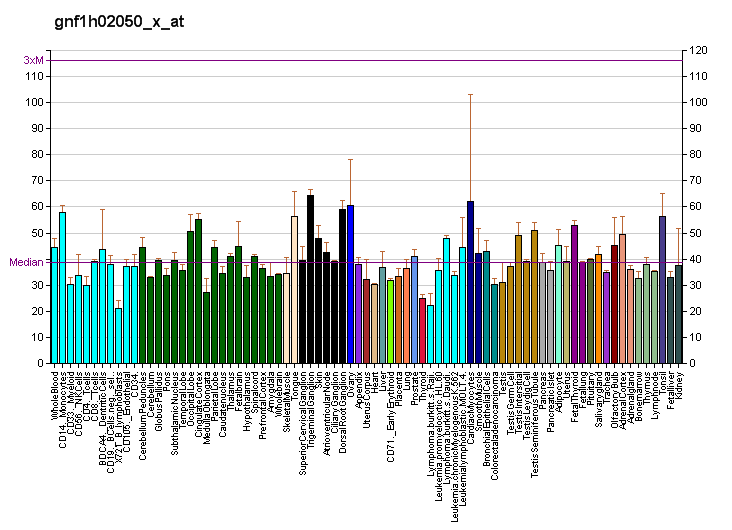

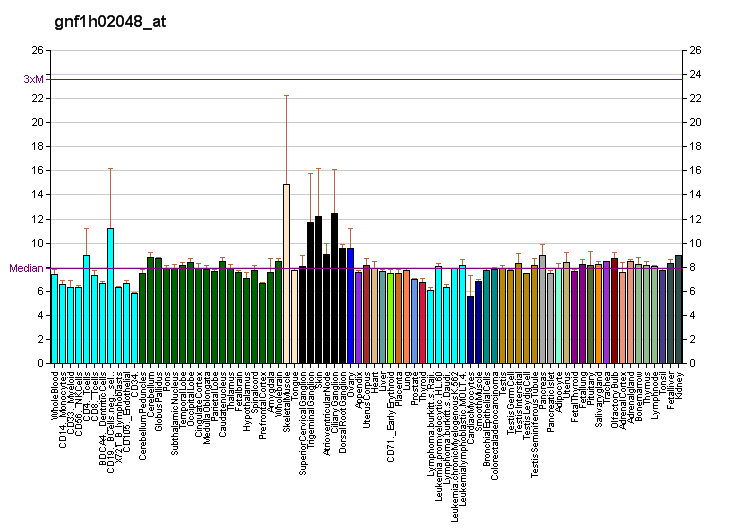

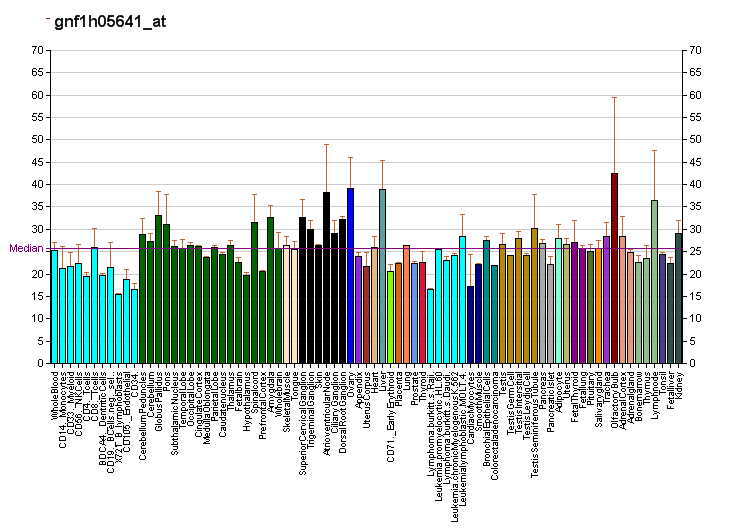
RNA expression pattern
Bgee	Human / Mouse (ortholog); Top expressed in: minor salivary glands; granulocyte; stromal cell of endometrium; apex of heart; cerebellar hemisphere; right hemisphere of cerebellum; right lung; right coronary artery; popliteal artery; tibial arteries / Top expressed in: granulocyte; seminiferous tubule; internal carotid artery; external carotid artery; genital tubercle; spermatid; tail of embryo; lacrimal gland; zygote; spermatocyte; More reference expression data
BioGPS	More reference expression data
Gene ontology
Molecular function	protein binding; transmembrane transporter binding
Cellular component	cytosol; Golgi apparatus; COPI-coated vesicle
Biological process	mitigation of host defenses by virus; viral process; protein localization to plasma membrane; protein localization to Golgi apparatus
Sources:Amigo / QuickGO
Orthologs
Databases	NCBI: entry; OMA: entry
Species	Human	Mouse
Entrez	55690	107975
Ensembl	ENSG00000175115	ENSMUSG00000024855
UniProt	Q6VY07	Q8K212
RefSeq (mRNA)	NM_018026; NM_178178	NM_153129; NM_001362451
RefSeq (protein)	NP_060496; NP_060496.2	NP_694769; NP_001349380; NP_001390495; NP_001390496; NP_001390497 NP_001390498
Location (UCSC)	Chr 11: 66.07 – 66.24 Mb	Chr 19: 5.18 – 5.32 Mb
PubMed search
- Wikidata
View/Edit Human	View/Edit Mouse

Phosphofurin acidic cluster sorting protein 1, also known as PACS-1, is a protein that in humans is encoded by the PACS1 gene.

== Function ==
The PACS-1 protein has a putative role in the localization of trans-Golgi network (TGN) membrane proteins. Mouse and rat homologs have been identified and studies of the homologous rat protein indicate a role in directing TGN localization of furin by binding to the protease's phosphorylated cytosolic domain. In addition, the human protein plays a role in HIV-1 Nef-mediated downregulation of cell surface MHC-I molecules to the TGN, thereby enabling HIV-1 to escape immune surveillance.

== Interactions ==
PACS1 has been shown to interact with Furin.

== Clinical significance ==
A de novo mutation c.607C>T in the PACS1 gene has been shown to result in a syndromic phenotype (colloquially called PACS1 Syndrome) that is characterized by global developmental delay, intellectual disability, and specific facial features.

=== Prevalence and diagnosis ===
The first two cases were identified in early 2011 by doctors in the Netherlands. As of late 2014, there were 20 cases identified worldwide.

Diagnosis is typically done using full genome or exome sequencing. There are likely several more cases that will eventually be reported as knowledge of the mutation spreads and testing becomes more accessible.

=== Observed and reported traits ===
Individuals with the mutation have been reported to have similar facial features, such as:

- Widely spaced eyes and low-set ears
- Down-slanting eye corners and mild uni-brow
- Highly arched eyebrows and long eyelashes
- Rounded “button” nose with a flat bridge
- Wide mouth with down-turned corners
- Thin upper lip and widely spaced teeth

Other common traits reported by care givers of affected individuals are:

- Low muscle tone
- Seizures
- Repetitive self-stimulatory behavior
- Sensory processing disorder
- Delayed development of gross motor skills and fine motor skills
- Delayed cognitive development
- Chewing and swallowing difficulties
- Digestion or bowel problems
- Slow growth resulting in below average height and weight

=== Prognosis and treatment ===
In combination, these traits affect walking, talking, feeding, and learning skills. No impact on life expectancy has been found. As with many developmental disabilities, there is no "cure".

In order to improve quality of life and enhance life skills of affected individuals, care givers have found a number of tools and strategies. All of these may not be applicable to a particular individual, and reported effectiveness has varied. It is recommended to consult with a physician prior to initiating any form of treatment.

- physiotherapy (PT)
- occupational therapy (OT)
- speech therapy (including augmentative and alternative communication) (SPT)
- behavioural therapy (applied behavior analysis/intensive behavioural intervention etc.)
- discrete trial teaching
- early intervention programs
- massage therapy and pediatric massage
- feeding therapy
- music therapy
- hippotherapy
- hydrotherapy
