= Repulsive guidance molecule A =

Protein-coding gene in the species Homo sapiens

RGMA

Identifiers
- Aliases: RGMA, RGM, repulsive guidance molecule family member a, repulsive guidance molecule BMP co-receptor a
- External IDs: OMIM: 607362; MGI: 2679262; GeneCards: RGMA
Available structures
PDB	Ortholog search: PDBe RCSB
PDB	List of PDB id codes 4UHY

Gene location (Human)
Chr.	Chromosome 15 (human)
Band	15q26.1	Start	93,035,271 bp
Band	15q26.1	End	93,089,211 bp

Gene location (Mouse)
Chr.	Chromosome 7 (mouse)
Band	7|7 D1	Start	73,025,257 bp
Band	7|7 D1	End	73,069,647 bp
RNA expression pattern
Bgee	Human / Mouse (ortholog); Top expressed in: gastrocnemius muscle; ventricular zone; tibialis anterior muscle; muscle of thigh; muscle layer of sigmoid colon; canal of the cervix; gastric mucosa; left uterine tube; hypothalamus; apex of heart / Top expressed in: ventricular zone; medial habenular nucleus; lip; interpeduncular nucleus; paraventricular nucleus of thalamus; layer of dentate gyrus; enteric plexus; molecular layer of neocortex; lumbar subsegment of spinal cord; superior frontal gyrus; More reference expression data
BioGPS	n/a
Gene ontology
Molecular function	transferrin receptor binding; protein binding; coreceptor activity
Cellular component	anchored component of membrane; plasma membrane; endoplasmic reticulum; membrane
Biological process	positive regulation of transcription by RNA polymerase II; BMP signaling pathway; negative regulation of axon regeneration; regulation of neuron projection development
Sources:Amigo / QuickGO
Orthologs
Databases	NCBI: entry; OMA: entry
Species	Human	Mouse
Entrez	56963	244058
Ensembl	ENSG00000182175	ENSMUSG00000070509
UniProt	Q96B86	Q6PCX7
RefSeq (mRNA)	NM_020211; NM_001166283; NM_001166286; NM_001166287; NM_001166288 NM_001166289	NM_177740
RefSeq (protein)	NP_001159755; NP_001159758; NP_001159759; NP_001159760; NP_001159761 NP_064596	NP_808408
Location (UCSC)	Chr 15: 93.04 – 93.09 Mb	Chr 7: 73.03 – 73.07 Mb
PubMed search
- Wikidata
View/Edit Human	View/Edit Mouse

Repulsive guidance molecule A (RGMa) is a bone morphogenetic protein (BMP) co-receptor of the repulsive guidance molecule family. Together with BMPR1A and BMPR1B, as well as ACVR2A and BMPR2, it binds BMPs thereby activating the intracellular SMAD1/5/8 signalling pathway. In humans this protein is encoded by the RGMA gene.

== Function ==
RGMa is a repulsive guidance molecule for retinal axons. Furthermore, neogenin functions as a receptor for RGM. Neogenin overexpression and RGM downexpression in the developing embryonic neural tube induces apoptosis. The apoptotic activity of neogenin in the neural tube is associated with cleavage of its cytoplasmic domain by caspases.

RGMA belongs to a family of repulsive guidance molecules that are (glycosylphosphatidylinositol)-linked cell-membrane-associated proteins. The three proteins, RGMa (this protein), RGMb and RGMc are 40-50% identical to each other, and share similarities in predicted protein domains and overall structure. All three RGM proteins appear capable of binding selected BMPs (bone morphogenetic proteins).

RGMs may play inhibitory roles in prostate cancer by suppressing cell growth, adhesion, migration and invasion. RGMs can coordinate Smad-dependent and Smad-independent signalling of BMPs in prostate cancer and breast cancer cells. RGMa is also pointed as a component of the mechanisms that determine skeletal cell fusion via neogenin receptor.
