= Proinsulin =

Precursor protein in humans

insulin
- Insulin undergoes extensive posttranslational modification along the production pathway. Production and secretion are largely independent; prepared insulin is stored awaiting secretion. Both C-peptide and mature insulin are biologically active. Cell components and proteins in this image are not to scale.

Identifiers
- Symbol: INS
- NCBI gene: 3630
- HGNC: 6081
- OMIM: 176730
- RefSeq: NM_000207
- UniProt: P01308

Other data
- Locus: Chr. 11 p15.5
Search for
- Structures: Swiss-model
- Domains: InterPro

Proinsulin is the prohormone precursor to insulin made in the beta cells of the Pancreatic Islets, specialized regions of the pancreas. In humans, proinsulin is encoded by the INS gene. The pancreatic islets only secrete between 1% and 3% of proinsulin intact. However, because proinsulin has a longer half life than insulin, it can account for anywhere from 5–30% of the insulin-like structures circulating in the blood. There are higher concentrations of proinsulin after meals and lower levels when a person is fasting. Additionally, while proinsulin and insulin have structural differences, proinsulin does demonstrate some affinity for the insulin receptor. Due to the relative similarities in structure, proinsulin can produce between 5% and 10% of the metabolic activity similarly induced by insulin.

Proinsulin is the final single chain protein structure secreted by cells before cleavage into mature insulin. Proinsulin was discovered by Professor Donald F. Steiner of the University of Chicago in 1967.

== Structure ==
Proinsulin is made up of 86 residues in humans (81 in cows), and formed by three distinct chains. The A chain, B chain, and the area connecting the two named the C peptide. The correct structure of proinsulin is crucial for the correct folding of mature insulin, as the placement of the C peptide sets the molecule up to create correctly positioned disulfide bonds in and between the A and B chains. There are three disulfide bonds that are necessary for mature insulin to be the correct structure. Two of these disulfide bonds are between the A and B chains, and one is an intra-A chain bond. The disulfide bonds occur between the seventh residues of the A and B chain, the 20th residue of the A chain and the 19th residue of the B chain, and the 6th and 11th residues of the A chain.

The C peptide is between the A and B chains of proinsulin. The connection between the A chain and C peptide is much more stable than the junction between the C peptide and B chain, with alpha helical features being exhibited near the C peptide-A chain connection. The C peptide-A chain junction occurs between residues 64 and 65 of proinsulin. These are lysine and arginine molecules, respectively. The C peptide-B chain connection is between two arginine residues at positions 31 and 32 of proinsulin.

There is conservation of much of the structure of proinsulin among mammalian species, with much of the residue changes seen from one species to another present in the C peptide. That said, the residues of the C peptide that are conserved across species interact with similarly conserved residues on the A and B chains. Thus, it is hypothesized that these conserved residues are important for the functionality of mature insulin.

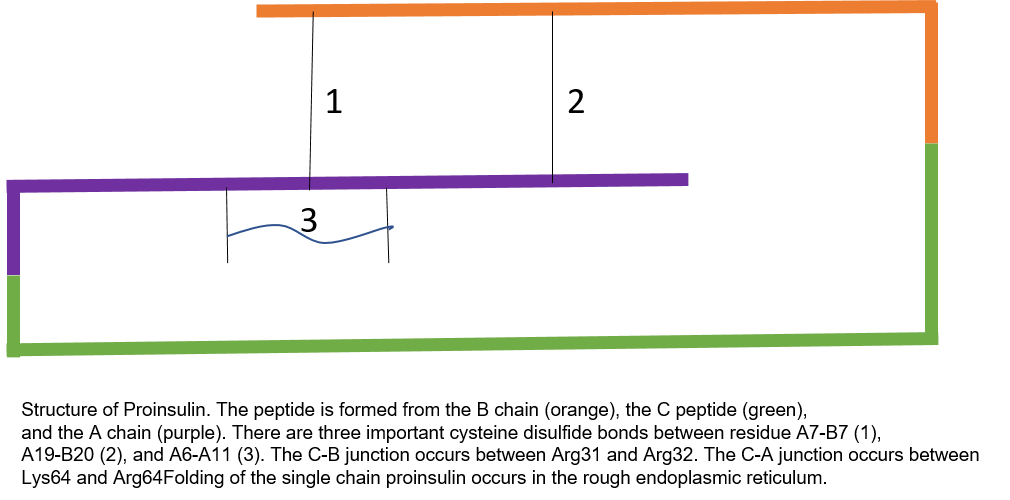

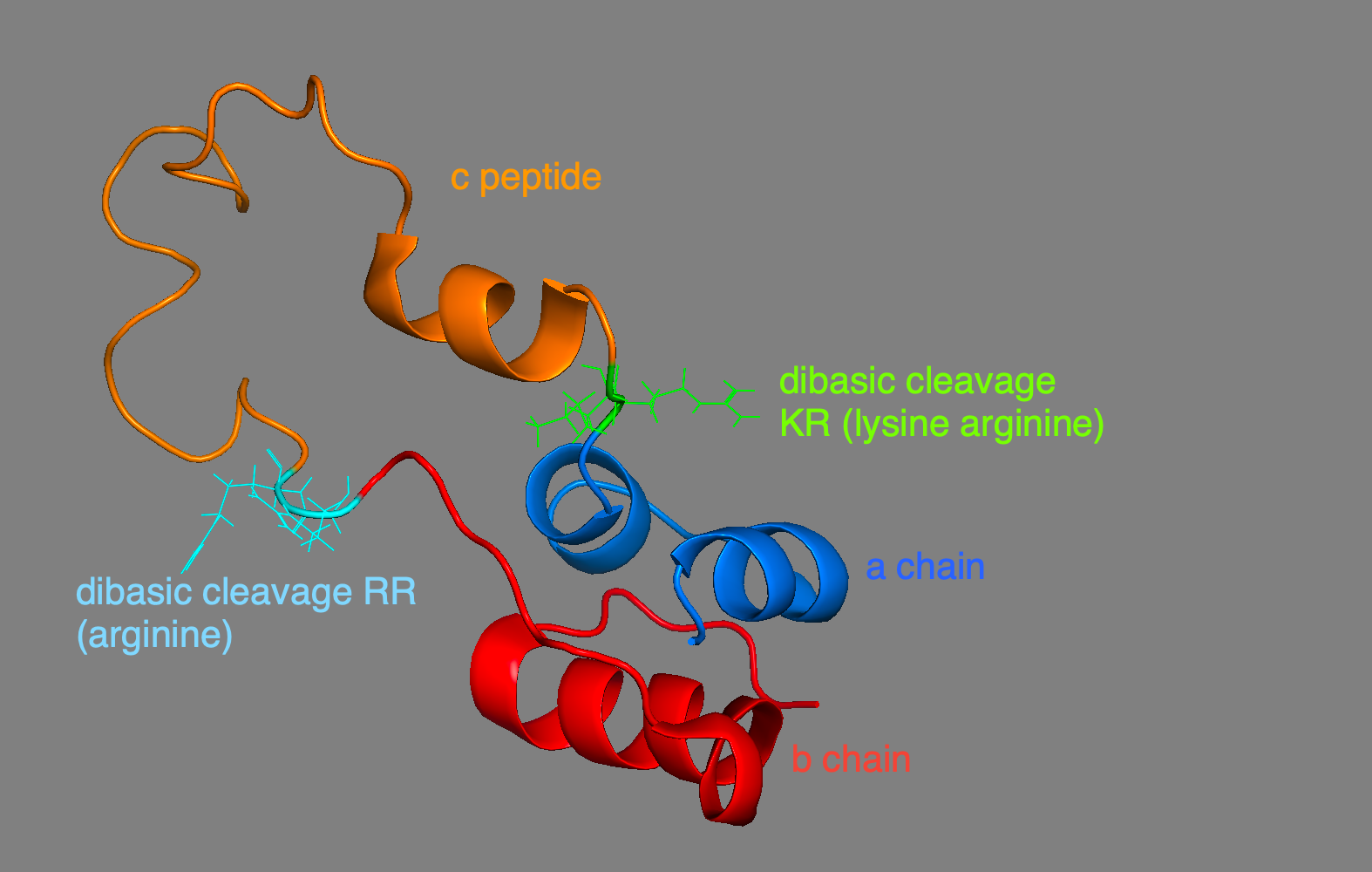

3D Model of proinsulin - A chain is in blue, b chain in red, c peptide in orange. The dibasic cleavage for c peptide and a chain is in green KR (lysine and arginine), the one for c peptide and b chain is in cyan RR (arginine).

== Synthesis and Post-translational Modification ==
Proinsulin is synthesized on membrane associated ribosomes found on the rough endoplasmic reticulum, where it is folded and its disulfide bonds are oxidized. It is then transported to the Golgi apparatus where it is packaged into secretory vesicles, and where it is processed by a series of proteases to form mature insulin. Mature insulin has 35 fewer amino acids; 4 are removed altogether, and the remaining 31 form the C-peptide. The C-peptide is abstracted from the center of the proinsulin sequence; the two other ends (the B chain and A chain) remain connected by disulfide bonds.

The post translational modification of proinsulin to mature insulin only occurs in the beta cells of the pancreatic islets. When proinsulin is transported through the Golgi apparatus the C-peptide is cleaved. This cleavage occurs with the aid of two endoproteases. Type I endoproteases, PC1 and PC3, disrupt the C peptide-B chain connection. PC2, a type II endoprotease, cleaves the C peptide-A chain bond. The resulting molecule, now mature insulin, is stored as a hexamer in secretory vesicles and is stabilized with $Zn^{2+}$ ions until it is secreted.

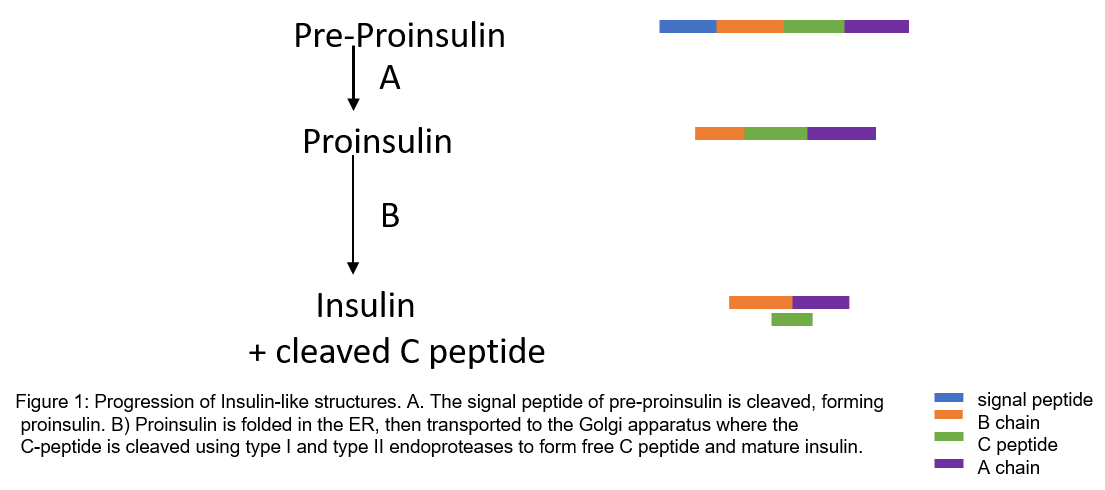

== Immunogenicity ==
When insulin was originally purified from bovine or porcine pancreata, all the proinsulin was not fully removed. When some people used these insulins, the proinsulin may have caused the body to react with a rash, to resist the insulin, or even to make dents or lumps in the skin at the place where the insulin was injected. This can be described as an iatrogenic injury due to slight differences between the proinsulin of different species. Since the late 1970s, when highly purified porcine insulin was introduced, and the level of insulin purity reached 99%, this ceased to be a significant clinical issue. With respect to their influence on insulin pharmacokinetics, moderate concentrations of certain insulin antibodies may be of positive advantage to all diabetics without endogenous insulin secretion (e.g. people with type 1 diabetes) because insulin binding antibodies effectively increase the insulin's clearance rate and distribution space and help to prolong its pharmacological and biological half lives.

== Medical Relevance ==
Historically, the focus of many insulin related metabolic diseases has focused on mature insulin. However, in recent years the importance of studying the structure and function of proinsulin or proinsulin:insulin ratio in relation to these diseases has become increasingly clear.

=== Diabetes Mellitus ===
Increased levels of proinsulin in the circulatory system relative to mature insulin concentrations can indicate impending insulin resistance and the development of type 2 diabetes. Additional problems with proinsulin that can lead to diabetes include mutations in the number of cysteines present, which could affect correct folding. If the mutation causes only a mild change it could simply stress the endoplasmic reticulum’s ability to properly fold the protein. This stress, after a while, would lead to a decrease in the number of β-cells producing mature insulin, and would then lead to diabetes mellitus.

=== Neonatal Diabetes Mellitus ===
Postnatal proinsulin is crucial for metabolic regulation. However, proinsulin in neonates is important for normal development of the nerves of the eye, development of the heart, and general survival of embryonic cells. Regulation of the concentration of proinsulin during embryonic development is crucial, as too much or too little of the peptide can cause defects and death of the fetus. Thus far in the study of neonatal diabetes mellitus, only amino acid change mutations found in the B domain lead to the disease.

== See also ==
- insulin
- preproinsulin
- signal peptide
- signal peptide peptidase
- proprotein convertase 1 (PC1)
- proprotein convertase 2 (PC2)
