= Hemojuvelin =

Mammalian protein found in humans

HJV

Identifiers
- Aliases: HJV, HFE2, hemojuvelin BMP co-receptor, HFE2A, hemochromatosis type 2 (juvenile), JH, RGMC
- External IDs: OMIM: 608374; MGI: 1916835; GeneCards: HJV
Available structures
| PDB | Ortholog search: PDBe RCSB |
| PDB | List of PDB id codes 4UI1 |

Gene location (Human)
| Chr. | Chromosome 1 (human) |
| Band | 1q21.1 | Start | 146,017,468 bp |
| Band | 1q21.1 | End | 146,036,746 bp |

Gene location (Mouse)
| Chr. | Chromosome 3 (mouse) |
| Band | 3|3 F2.1 | Start | 96,432,488 bp |
| Band | 3|3 F2.1 | End | 96,436,526 bp |
RNA expression pattern
| Bgee | Human / Mouse (ortholog); Top expressed in: muscle of thigh; Skeletal muscle tissue of rectus abdominis; gastrocnemius muscle; quadriceps femoris muscle; vastus lateralis muscle; tibialis anterior muscle; deltoid muscle; biceps brachii; Skeletal muscle tissue of biceps brachii; right lobe of liver / Top expressed in: interventricular septum; triceps brachii muscle; vastus lateralis muscle; medial head of gastrocnemius muscle; temporal muscle; knee joint; sternocleidomastoid muscle; skeletal muscle tissue; digastric muscle; ankle; More reference expression data |
| BioGPS | n/a |
Gene ontology
| Molecular function | coreceptor activity; BMP binding; protein binding; BMP receptor activity; transferrin receptor binding; signaling receptor binding |
| Cellular component | membrane; plasma membrane; cell surface; plasma membrane protein complex; BMP receptor complex; anchored component of membrane; HFE-transferrin receptor complex; extracellular space |
| Biological process | iron ion homeostasis; cellular response to BMP stimulus; protein autoprocessing; negative regulation of transcription by RNA polymerase II; BMP signaling pathway; negative regulation of BMP signaling pathway; positive regulation of transcription by RNA polymerase II; activin receptor signaling pathway; cellular iron ion homeostasis |
Sources:Amigo / QuickGO
Orthologs
| Databases | NCBI: entry; OMA: entry |
| Species | Human | Mouse |
| Entrez | 148738 | 69585 |
| Ensembl | ENSG00000168509 | ENSMUSG00000038403 |
| UniProt | Q6ZVN8 | Q7TQ32 |
| RefSeq (mRNA) | NM_145277; NM_202004; NM_213652; NM_213653; NM_001316767 NM_001379352 | NM_027126 |
| RefSeq (protein) | NP_001303696; NP_660320; NP_973733; NP_998817; NP_998818 NP_001366281 | NP_081402 |
| Location (UCSC) | Chr 1: 146.02 – 146.04 Mb | Chr 3: 96.43 – 96.44 Mb |
| PubMed search |
- Wikidata
| View/Edit Human | View/Edit Mouse |

Hemojuvelin (HJV), also known as repulsive guidance molecule C (RGMc) or hemochromatosis type 2 protein (HFE2), is a membrane-bound and soluble protein in mammals that is responsible for the iron overload condition known as juvenile hemochromatosis in humans, a severe form of hemochromatosis. In humans, the hemojuvelin protein is encoded by the HFE2 gene. Hemojuvelin is a member of the repulsive guidance molecule family of proteins. Both RGMa and RGMb are found in the nervous system, while hemojuvelin is found in skeletal muscle and the liver.

== Function ==
For many years the signal transduction pathways that regulate systemic iron homeostasis have been unknown. However it has been demonstrated that hemojuvelin interacts with bone morphogenetic protein (BMP), possibly as a co-receptor, and may signal via the SMAD pathway to regulate hepcidin expression. Associations with BMP2 and BMP4 have been described.

Mouse HJV knock-out models confirmed that HJV is the gene responsible for juvenile hemochromatosis. Hepcidin levels in the liver are dramatically depressed in these knockout animals.

A soluble form of HJV may be a molecule that suppresses hepcidin expression.

RGMs may play inhibitory roles in prostate cancer by suppressing cell growth, adhesion, migration and invasion. RGMs can coordinate Smad-dependent and Smad-independent signalling of BMPs in prostate cancer and breast cancer cells. Furthermore, aberrant expression of RGMs was indicated in breast cancer. The perturbed expression was associated with disease progression and poor prognosis.

== Related gene problems ==
- TAR syndrome
- 1q21.1 deletion syndrome
- 1q21.1 duplication syndrome

== Gene structure and transcription ==
RGMc/HJV is a 4-exon gene in mammals that undergoes alternative RNA splicing to yield 3 mRNAs with different 5' untranslated regions (5'UTRs). Gene transcription is induced during myoblast differentiation, producing all 3 mRNAs. There are three critical promoter elements responsible for transcriptional activation in skeletal muscle (the tissue that has the highest level of RGMc expressesion per weight), comprising paired E-boxes, a putative Stat and/or Ets element, and a MEF2 site, and muscle transcription factors myogenin and MEF2C stimulate RGMc promoter function in non-muscle cells. As these elements are conserved in RGMc genes from multiple species, these results suggest that RGMc has been a muscle-enriched gene throughout its evolutionary history.

RGMc/HJV, is transcriptionally regulated during muscle differentiation.

== Isoforms ==
Two classes of GPI-anchored and glycosylated HJV molecules are targeted to the membrane and undergo distinct fates.

- Full-length HJV is released from the cell surface and accumulates in extracellular fluid, where its half-life exceeds 24 hours. There appears to be two potential soluble isoforms and two membrane-associated isoforms.
- The predominant membrane-associated isoform, a disulfide-linked two-chain form composed of N- and C-terminal fragments, is not found in the extracellular fluid, and is short-lived, as it disappears from the cell surface with a half-life of < 3 hours after interruption of protein synthesis.

RGMc appears to undergo a complex processing that generates 2 soluble, single-chain forms, and two membrane-bound forms found as a (i) single-chain, and (ii) two-chain species which appears to be cleaved at a site within a partial von Willebrand factor domain.

Using a combination of biochemical and cell-based approaches, it has demonstrated that BMP-2 could interact in biochemical assays with the single-chain HJV species, and also could bind to cell-associated HJV. Two mouse HJV amino acid substitution mutants, D165E and G313V (corresponding to human D172E and G320V), also could bind BMP-2, but less effectively than wild-type HJV, while G92V (human G99V) could not. In contrast, the membrane-spanning protein, neogenin, a receptor for the related molecule, RGMa, preferentially bound membrane-associated heterodimeric RGMc and was able to interact on cells only with wild-type RGMc and G92V. These results show that different isoforms of RGMc/HJV may play unique physiological roles through defined interactions with distinct signaling proteins and demonstrate that, in some disease-linked HJV mutants, these interactions are defective.

== Structure ==
In 2009, the Rosetta ab initio protein structure prediction software has been used to create a three-dimensional model of the RGM family of proteins., In 2011, a crystal structure of a fragment of hemojuvelin binding to neogenin was completed showing similar structures to the ab initio model and further informing the view of the RGM family of proteins.

== Mechanism of action ==
Furin-like proprotein convertases (PPC) are responsible for conversion of 50 kDa HJV to a 40 kDa protein with a truncated COOH-terminus, at a conserved polybasic RNRR site. This suggests a potential mechanism to generate the soluble forms of HJV/hemojuvelin (s-hemojuvelin) found in the blood of rodents and humans.

== Clinical significance ==
Mutations in HJV are responsible for the vast majority of juvenile hemochromatosis patients. A small number of patients have mutations in the hepcidin (HAMP) gene. The gene was positionally cloned. Hemojuvelin is highly expressed in skeletal muscle and heart, and to a lesser extent in the liver. One insight into the pathogenesis of juvenile hemochromatosis is that patients have low to undetectable urinary hepcidin levels, suggesting that hemojuvelin is a positive regulator of hepcidin, the central iron regulatory hormone. As a result, low hepcidin levels would result in increased intestinal iron absorption. Thus, HJV/RGMc appears to play a critical role in iron metabolism.
