= Donald F. Steiner =

American biochemist

Donald Frederick Steiner
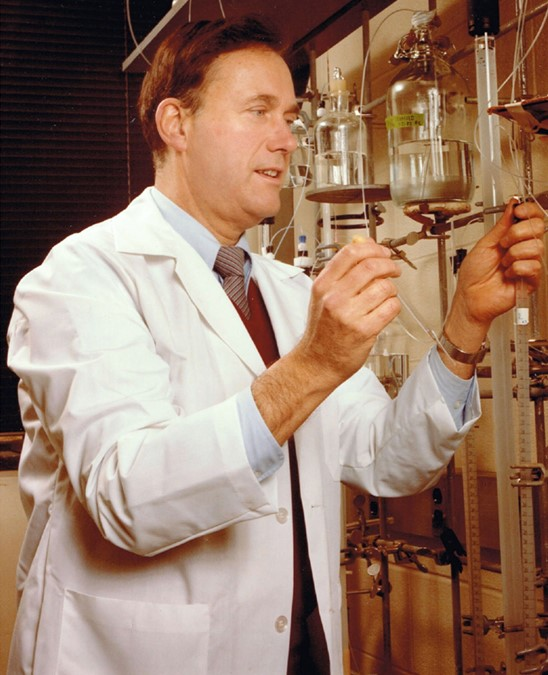
- Steiner in his lab in the mid-1970s
- Born: July 15, 1930; Lima, Ohio
- Died: November 11, 2014 (aged 84); Chicago
- Education: University of Cincinnati, University of Chicago, M.D. (1956).
- Known for: Discovery of proinsulin
- Awards: Canada Gairdner International Award, Banting Medal of the American Diabetes Association, Wolf Prize in Medicine, honorary doctorate at Uppsala University, Sweden
- Scientific career
- Fields: Biochemistry
- Workplaces: University of Chicago

Donald Frederick Steiner (July 15, 1930 – November 11, 2014) was an American biochemist and a professor at the University of Chicago.

== Birth and education ==
Donald F. Steiner was born in 1930 in Lima, Ohio. He completed his B.S. in Chemistry and Zoology from the University of Cincinnati in 1952. He completed his M.S. in biochemistry and his M.D. from the University of Chicago in 1956. He then completed his medical and research training – with an internship at King County Hospital and residency/post-doctoral research at the University of Washington – before returning to the University of Chicago as a faculty member in 1960.

== Career ==
Steiner was promoted to full professor in 1968, and became chair of the department of biochemistry in 1973. From 1985 to 2006, Steiner was a senior investigator of the Howard Hughes Medical Institute.

In 1972, Steiner was elected to the American Academy of Arts and Sciences. The following year, he was elected to the National Academy of Sciences.

He died in Chicago on November 11, 2014.

== Research ==
Donald F. Steiner is known for his work in diabetes research, protein processing, and hormone biology. In 1967, he published his discovery of proinsulin, precursor to the active hormone insulin. He and his colleagues discovered some of the enzymes that convert proinsulin into insulin, and also devised methods for measuring insulin and its precursors in human serum.

== Awards ==
- In 1970 he received the Ernst Oppenheimer Award for the Endocrine Society
- In 1971 he received the Canada Gairdner International Award
- In 1976 he received the Banting Medal for Scientific Achievement from the American Diabetes Association
- In 1984/5, he was awarded the Wolf Prize in Medicine for "his discoveries concerning the bio-synthesis and processing of insulin which have had profound implications for basic biology and clinical medicine".
- In 1993, he received an honorary doctorate from the faculty of medicine at Uppsala University, Sweden
- In 2004, he was elected to the American Philosophical Society
- In 2014, he received the University of Chicago Alumni Medal
