= Larry Swanson =

American neuroscientist (born 1945)

Larry W. Swanson (born December 13, 1945, in Camp Lejeune, North Carolina) is an American neuroscientist who has held positions at Washington University School of Medicine, The Salk Institute of Biological Studies and the University of Southern California, focusing on how the nervous system functions. Swanson is best known for his complex studies in how neurons control different aspects of motivation and emotional behavior.

== Education and career ==
Swanson received a bachelor's degree in chemistry from Pomona College, California, in 1968, and a PhD in Neurobiology from Washington University in St. Louis, in 1972. He was a postdoctoral fellow with W. Maxwell Cowan at the Washington University School of Medicine and a research associate with the Italian Nobel Laureate, Rita Levi-Montalcini, in the Department of Biology at the Washington University. He began his career on the faculty at the University of Washington and quickly moved to California to work at The Salk Institute for Biological Studies and the Howard Hughes Medical Institute. In 1990 he joined the faculty at the University of Southern California where he was appointed the Milo Don and Lucille Appleman Professor of Biological Sciences in 1995.

== Research ==
Central and peripheral nervous system components

The types of studies presented by Swanson were/are: what parts of the body are involved with the nervous system, both central nervous system and peripheral nervous system, and how actions are influenced by the different parts of the nervous system . Swanson has a Ph.D. in Neurobiology and most of his studies focus around the brain and how it interacts with many different aspects of life. The brain is part of the central nervous system, along with the spinal cord, which is a main aspect of Swanson's study on how the brain is structured and how different neurotransmitters can affect the brain. Swanson has an extensive amount of research dedicated to the brain and the layout of the brain and what is called the “fundamental plan.” The “fundamental plans” consists of the layout of mammalian brains, specifically rat brains. The layout created of the rat brains was the first ever computer graphical analyses of the brain produced, which have developed several different types of computer analysis programs for the structural development of mammalian brains, showing a growing development in the science world. One example of the "fundamental plan" being utilized by Swanson was the research proposed on the amygdala. This showed that there are different types of cells present in different divisions of the amygdala, and that there are different functions associated with the different divisions. A similar study conducted by Swanson and Joel Hahn studied the formation of the hippocampus, specifically focusing on the roles of the hippocampus: memory, emotion, and motivated behaviors. This demonstrated relationships between different areas of the hippocampus like that of the amygdala above. These layouts lead to the structural analysis of the central nervous system of mammals and the neuroanatomy present within the mammal.

A majority of Larry Swanson's research was on rats and their nervous system. One study showed the structure of the rat's brain and the effect on the central nervous system, which encompasses the brain and spinal cord. There are many neuronal bodies that reside in the brain and spinal cord of mammalian bodies, specifically rats in Swanson's study. The job of a neuronal body is to transmit information from the brain to other parts of the body. Therefore, the study focused on how there are signals being transmitted to produce signals elsewhere in the rat's body, such as the peripheral nervous system. Swanson was the first person to develop the Neurome Project on rats. This project took place over the course of many studies and eventually developed a connectome of the whole central nervous system. When Swanson and Bota completed a Neurome Project on rats, it was an analysis of the rat's body with all the neural connections going throughout the body. The study of rat neuroma projects continued and now is done by Larry Swanson, Joel Hahn, and Olaf Sporns.

Swanson’s research came up with three conclusions that focused on the nervous system. The first conclusion was a group of cells: medial preoptic nucleus, dorsal premammillary nucleus, and ventral premammillary nucleus all generated a projection with one branch going to the brainstem and the second branch to the thalamus. The second conclusion was that the nuclei stated above form parts of circuits, which aid in how one behaves. This plays a role in social behavior and survival of a species. The third and last conclusion was that the ventromedial column of the nuclei is part of the behavioral control column.

== Honors and awards ==
Larry Swanson is the recipient of many awards and honors throughout his career. One of Swanson's most important awards was the McKnight neuroscience Development Award. This was the first award given to Swanson, encouraging his research in the early stages of his career. Larry Swanson was also granted the University of Southern California's highest research award, the Associate's Award For Creativity in Research and Scholarship in 2005. This award was given due to his expert and abstract research on the nervous system. Later in his career, Swanson was given the privilege to join the National Academy of Sciences committee in 2010. This was a big step in his career because only elite members are elected to provide scientific information about ongoing research and methods. Swanson was granted many honors and awards throughout his career for his research on the nervous system.

| Awards/Honors | Year |
|---|---|
| McKnight Neuroscience Development Award | 1985 and 1987 |
| American Association for the Advancement of Science Fellow | 2002 and 2003 |
| Grant by National Institute of Neurological Diseases | 2004 |
| Associates Award for Creativity in Research and Scholarship | 2005 |
| Society for Neurosciences Publications Committee | 2006 |
| Javits Investigator Award for Neuroscience | 2006 and 2013 |
| National Academy of Science | 2010 |
| President of the Society of Neuroscience | 2013 |

== Publications ==
Swanson is the author of two books: From Development to Degeneration and Regeneration of the Nervous System and Neuroanatomical Terminology: A Lexicon of Classical Origins and Historical Foundations.

In 2009, Swanson, along with, Charles E. Ribak, Carlos Aramburo, Edward G. Jones, and Jorge Larriva Sahd, published, From Development to Degeneration and Regeneration of the Nervous System. Swanson and his colleagues published their research and findings through the Oxford University Press in New York, New York. This book contains information on neuronal migration and development, degenerative brain diseases, as well as neural plasticity and regeneration. The book goes into detail about the development of many different brain regions within the forebrain, along with analyzing the development of the forebrain, Swanson and his colleagues describe the significant cellular and molecular changes found in different human diseases.

Larry Swanson is the author of another book, Neuroanatomical Terminology: A Lexicon of Classical Origins and Historical Foundations, also published through the Oxford University Press in September 2014. This book consists of neuroanatomical and medical vocabulary which includes a definition while explaining the age and sex to which the term pertains to. The book also consists of imaging methods that explain terminology that relates to the nervous system while providing network analysis. Swanson's book is well-known for being one of the first documented lists that organizes the human nervous system through a hierarchy.

Aside from his individual book publications, Swanson has written 257 research articles from 1973-2020.
