= PCSK5 =

Protein-coding gene in the species Homo sapiens

Identifiers
- Aliases: PCSK5, PC5, PC6, PC6A, SPC6, proprotein convertase subtilisin/kexin type 5
- External IDs: OMIM: 600488; MGI: 97515; HomoloGene: 21244; GeneCards: PCSK5; OMA:PCSK5 - orthologs

Gene location (Human)
Chr.	Chromosome 9 (human)
Band	9q21.13	Start	75,890,644 bp
Band	9q21.13	End	76,362,975 bp

Gene location (Mouse)
Chr.	Chromosome 19 (mouse)
Band	19 B|19 12.86 cM	Start	17,409,683 bp
Band	19 B|19 12.86 cM	End	17,814,996 bp
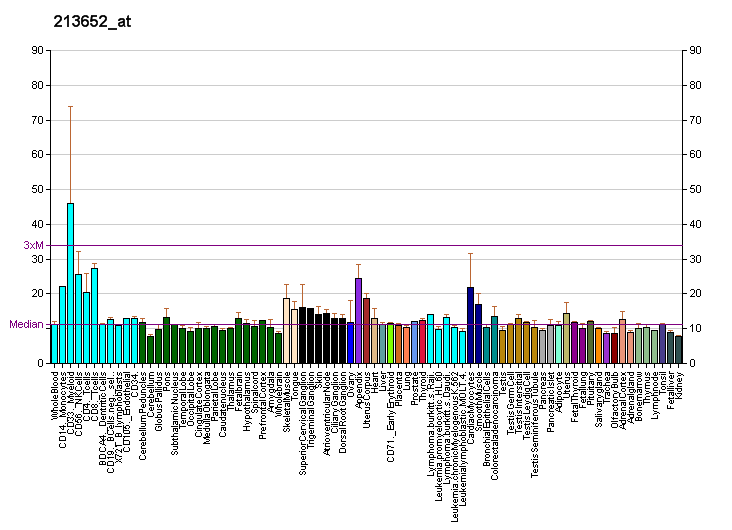

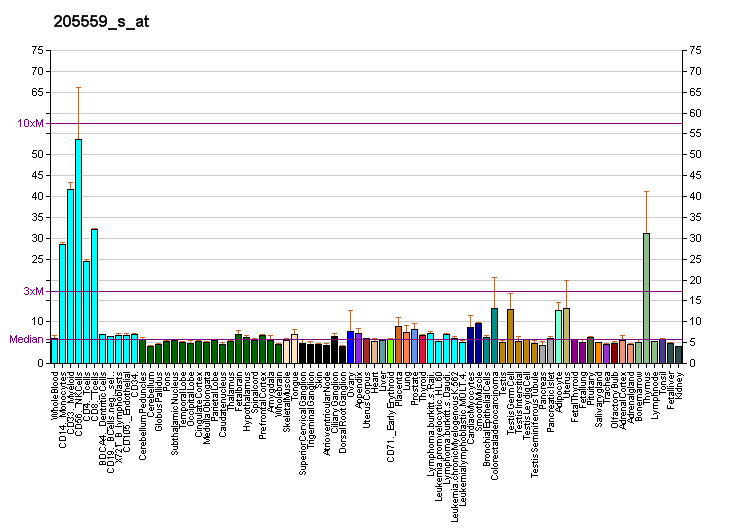

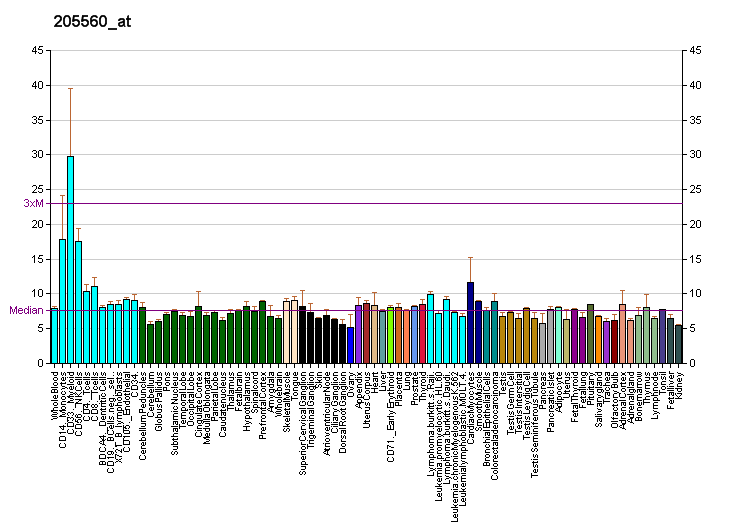
RNA expression pattern
Bgee	Human / Mouse (ortholog); Top expressed in: buccal mucosa cell; saphenous vein; sural nerve; pericardium; pancreatic ductal cell; secondary oocyte; visceral pleura; mucosa of paranasal sinus; duodenum; parietal pleura / Top expressed in: external carotid artery; internal carotid artery; gastrula; Paneth cell; vas deferens; lumbar spinal ganglion; adrenal gland; Gonadal ridge; body of femur; vestibular sensory epithelium; More reference expression data
BioGPS	More reference expression data
Gene ontology
Molecular function	serine-type endopeptidase activity; peptidase activity; hydrolase activity; serine-type peptidase activity; peptide binding; protein binding; endopeptidase activity
Cellular component	integral component of membrane; endomembrane system; Golgi lumen; membrane; secretory granule; Golgi apparatus; extracellular region; extracellular space; trans-Golgi network; integral component of Golgi membrane
Biological process	viral life cycle; proteolysis; female pregnancy; cell-cell signaling; coronary vasculature development; renin secretion into blood stream; development of the heart; cardiac septum development; determination of left/right symmetry; protein processing; signal peptide processing; limb morphogenesis; respiratory tube development; peptide biosynthetic process; embryo implantation; peptide hormone processing; kidney development; embryonic skeletal system development; embryonic digestive tract development; anterior/posterior pattern specification; regulation of lipoprotein lipase activity; nerve growth factor processing
Sources:Amigo / QuickGO
Orthologs
Species	Human	Mouse
Entrez	5125	18552
Ensembl	ENSG00000099139	ENSMUSG00000024713
UniProt	Q92824	Q04592
RefSeq (mRNA)	NM_001190482; NM_006200; NM_001372043	NM_001163144; NM_001190483
RefSeq (protein)	NP_001177411; NP_006191; NP_001358972	NP_001156616; NP_001177412
Location (UCSC)	Chr 9: 75.89 – 76.36 Mb	Chr 19: 17.41 – 17.81 Mb
PubMed search
- Wikidata
View/Edit Human	View/Edit Mouse

Proprotein convertase subtilisin/kexin type 5 is an enzyme that in humans is encoded by the PCSK5 gene, found in chromosome 9q21.3 Two alternatively spliced transcripts are described for this gene but only one has its full length nature known.

== Function ==
The protein encoded by this gene belongs to the subtilisin-like proprotein convertase family. The members of this family are proprotein convertases that process latent precursor proteins into their biologically active products. This encoded protein mediates posttranslational endoproteolytic processing for several integrin alpha subunits. It is thought to process prorenin, pro-membrane type-1 matrix metalloproteinase and HIV-1 glycoprotein gp160.

== Clinical significance ==
Mutations in this gene have been associated with Currarino syndrome-like malformations.

PCSK5 expression has been linked to higher survival rates for lung cancer patients.
