= PCSK6 =

Protein-coding gene in the species Homo sapiens

Identifiers
- Aliases: PCSK6, PACE4, SPC4, proprotein convertase subtilisin/kexin type 6
- External IDs: OMIM: 167405; MGI: 102897; GeneCards: PCSK6

Gene location (Human)
Chr.	Chromosome 15 (human)
Band	15q26.3	Start	101,289,784 bp
Band	15q26.3	End	101,525,202 bp

Gene location (Mouse)
Chr.	Chromosome 7 (mouse)
Band	7 C|7 35.36 cM	Start	65,511,482 bp
Band	7 C|7 35.36 cM	End	65,700,134 bp
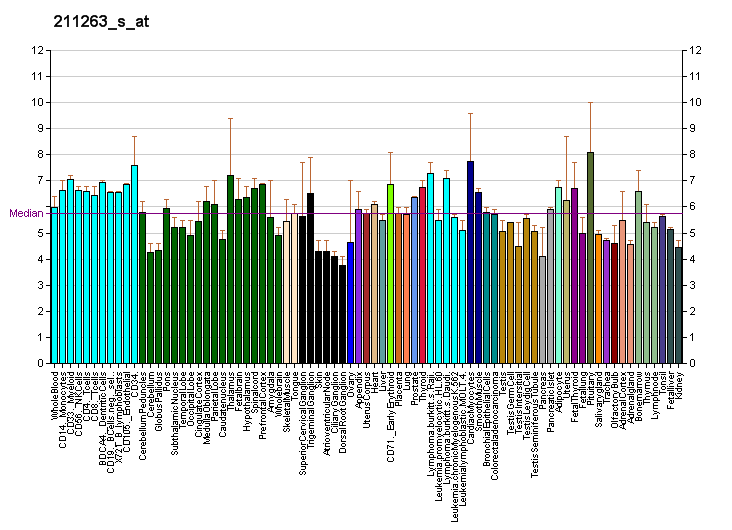

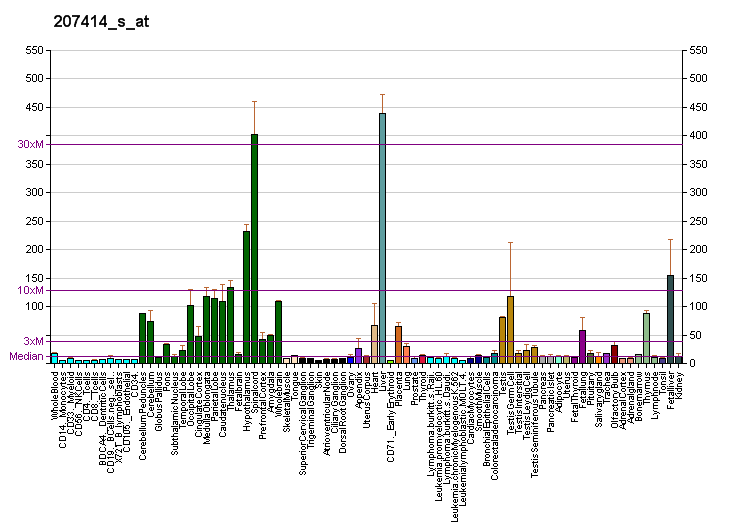

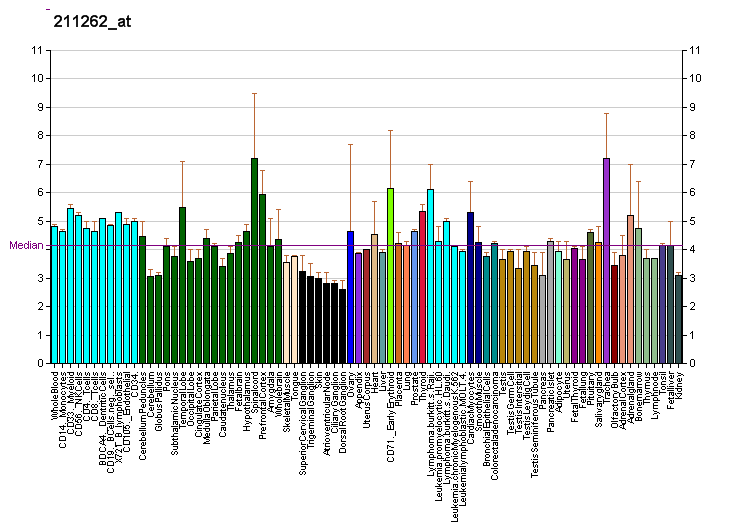
RNA expression pattern
Bgee	Human / Mouse (ortholog); Top expressed in: C1 segment; liver; right lobe of liver; middle frontal gyrus; corpus callosum; spleen; inferior ganglion of vagus nerve; inferior olivary nucleus; synovial joint; subthalamic nucleus / Top expressed in: ankle; Dermatocranium; calvaria; stria vascularis; lip; esophagus; left lobe of liver; membranous bone; body of femur; cerebellar vermis; More reference expression data
BioGPS	More reference expression data
Gene ontology
Molecular function	heparin binding; nerve growth factor binding; peptidase activity; serine-type peptidase activity; serine-type endopeptidase activity; hydrolase activity; endopeptidase activity; protein binding
Cellular component	membrane; extracellular matrix; cell surface; endoplasmic reticulum; Golgi lumen; endomembrane system; extracellular region; extracellular space; plasma membrane; collagen-containing extracellular matrix
Biological process	glycoprotein metabolic process; secretion by cell; protein processing; proteolysis; regulation of BMP signaling pathway; determination of left/right symmetry; peptide hormone processing; zygotic determination of anterior/posterior axis, embryo; nerve growth factor production; cornification; regulation of lipoprotein lipase activity; nerve growth factor processing
Sources:Amigo / QuickGO
Orthologs
Databases	NCBI: entry; OMA: entry
Species	Human	Mouse
Entrez	5046	18553
Ensembl	ENSG00000140479	ENSMUSG00000030513
UniProt	P29122	n/a
RefSeq (mRNA)	NM_138325; NM_001291309; NM_002570; NM_138319; NM_138320 NM_138321; NM_138322; NM_138323; NM_138324	NM_001291184; NM_011048
RefSeq (protein)	NP_001278238; NP_002561; NP_612192; NP_612195; NP_612196 NP_612197; NP_612198	n/a
Location (UCSC)	Chr 15: 101.29 – 101.53 Mb	Chr 7: 65.51 – 65.7 Mb
PubMed search
- Wikidata
View/Edit Human	View/Edit Mouse

Proprotein convertase subtilisin/kexin type 6 is an protease that in humans is encoded by the PCSK6 gene which is located in chromosome 15. Pcsk6 is a calcium-dependent serine endoprotease that catalyzes the post-translational modification of precursor proteins from its 'latent' form to the cleaved 'active' form. Active Pcsk6 has been reported to process substrates such as transforming growth factor β, pro-albumin, von Willebrand factor, and corin. Clinically, Pcsk6 is suggested to play a role in left/right asymmetry, structural asymmetry of the brain, handedness, tumor progression, hemostasis, and cardiovascular diseases.

== Function ==
The protein encoded by this gene belongs to the subtilisin-like proprotein convertase family. The members of this family are proprotein convertases that process latent precursor proteins into their biologically active products. This encoded protein is a calcium-dependent serine endoprotease that can cleave precursor protein at their paired basic amino acid processing sites. Some of its substrates are - transforming growth factor beta related proteins, pro-albumin, von Willebrand factor, and corin. Alternatively spliced transcript variants encoding different isoforms have been identified.

== Clinical significance ==
=== During development ===
Throughout development, the spatial and temporal expression of pcsk6 regulates embryogenesis by activating TGFβ related differentiation factors, which include BMP and Nodal. Elevated levels of Pcsk6 was detected in maternal decidual cells of the implantation site and the extraembryonic ectoderm. The regulation of proper gradient of Nodal and BMPs is crucial for gastrulation, proximal-distal axis, and establishment of left-right axis patterning.

Developmental Pcsk6 knockout studies found that mice embryos that lack Pcsk6 develop heterotaxia, left pulmonary isomerism, and/or craniofacial malformations due to disruption in specification of anterior-posterior and left-right axis that resulted from the dysregulation of Nodal and BMP signaling.

In humans, Pcsk6 VNTR polymorphism is associated with the structural asymmetry of the frontal and temporal lobe, and degree of handedness.

=== Cardiovascular disease ===
Pcsk6 is increasing interest as indicator and factor of cardiovascular disease. Pcsk6 KO mice was shown to develop salt-sensitive hypertension due to failure of pro-corin activation crucial to atrial natriuretic peptide regulation of blood pressure. A hypertensive patient was found to have a G/A mutation on the PCSK6 gene that resulted in an Asp282Asn (D282N) substitution at the Pcsk6 catalytic domain, which in turn, hinders corin processing. In vascular remodeling, Pcsk6 was found to induce smooth muscle cell migration in response to PDGFB by activating MMP14. When Pcsk6 was knocked out, the intimal hyperplasia response to in vivo carotid ligation was lowered.

=== Cancer ===
This gene is thought to play a role in tumor progression.
