= PCSK7 =

Protein-coding gene in humans

Identifiers
- Aliases: PCSK7, LPC, PC7, PC8, SPC7, proprotein convertase subtilisin/kexin type 7
- External IDs: OMIM: 604872; MGI: 107421; GeneCards: PCSK7

Gene location (Human)
Chr.	Chromosome 11 (human)
Band	11q23.3	Start	117,204,337 bp
Band	11q23.3	End	117,232,525 bp

Gene location (Mouse)
Chr.	Chromosome 9 (mouse)
Band	9 A5.2|9 25.32 cM	Start	45,817,795 bp
Band	9 A5.2|9 25.32 cM	End	45,841,024 bp
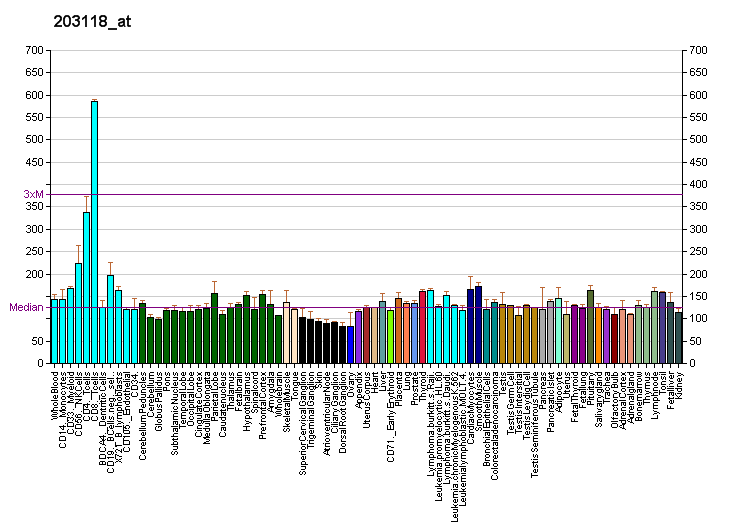
RNA expression pattern
Bgee	Human / Mouse (ortholog); Top expressed in: granulocyte; sural nerve; mucosa of transverse colon; gastric mucosa; left uterine tube; body of stomach; epithelium of colon; buccal mucosa cell; lymph node; rectum / Top expressed in: granulocyte; neural layer of retina; spermatocyte; large intestine; right kidney; colon; submandibular gland; epithelium of stomach; lip; thymus; More reference expression data
BioGPS	More reference expression data
Gene ontology
Molecular function	peptidase activity; serine-type peptidase activity; hydrolase activity; serine-type endopeptidase activity
Cellular component	integral component of membrane; integral component of Golgi membrane; Golgi apparatus; membrane; trans-Golgi network
Biological process	protein processing; peptide hormone processing; proteolysis
Sources:Amigo / QuickGO
Orthologs
Databases	NCBI: entry; OMA: entry
Species	Human	Mouse
Entrez	9159	18554
Ensembl	ENSG00000160613	ENSMUSG00000035382
UniProt	Q16549	Q61139
RefSeq (mRNA)	NM_004716	NM_001281934; NM_008794
RefSeq (protein)	NP_004707	NP_001268863; NP_032820
Location (UCSC)	Chr 11: 117.2 – 117.23 Mb	Chr 9: 45.82 – 45.84 Mb
PubMed search
- Wikidata
View/Edit Human	View/Edit Mouse

Proprotein convertase subtilisin/kexin type 7 is an enzyme that in humans is encoded by the PCSK7 gene.

The protein encoded by this gene belongs to the subtilisin-like proprotein convertase family. The members of this family are proprotein convertases that process latent precursor proteins into their biologically active products. This encoded protein is a calcium-dependent serine endoprotease. It is structurally related to its family members, PACE and PACE4. This protein is concentrated in the trans-Golgi network, associated with the membranes, and is not secreted. It can process proalbumin and is thought to be responsible for the activation of HIV envelope glycoproteins gp160 and gp140.

This gene has been implicated in the transcriptional regulation of housekeeping genes. Multiple alternatively spliced transcripts are described for this gene but their full length nature is not yet known. Downstream of this gene's map location at 11q23-q24, nucleotides that match part of this gene's 3' end are duplicated and inverted. A translocation breakpoint associated with lymphoma occurs between this gene and its inverted counterpart.
