= Furin =

Enzyme found in humans

FURIN
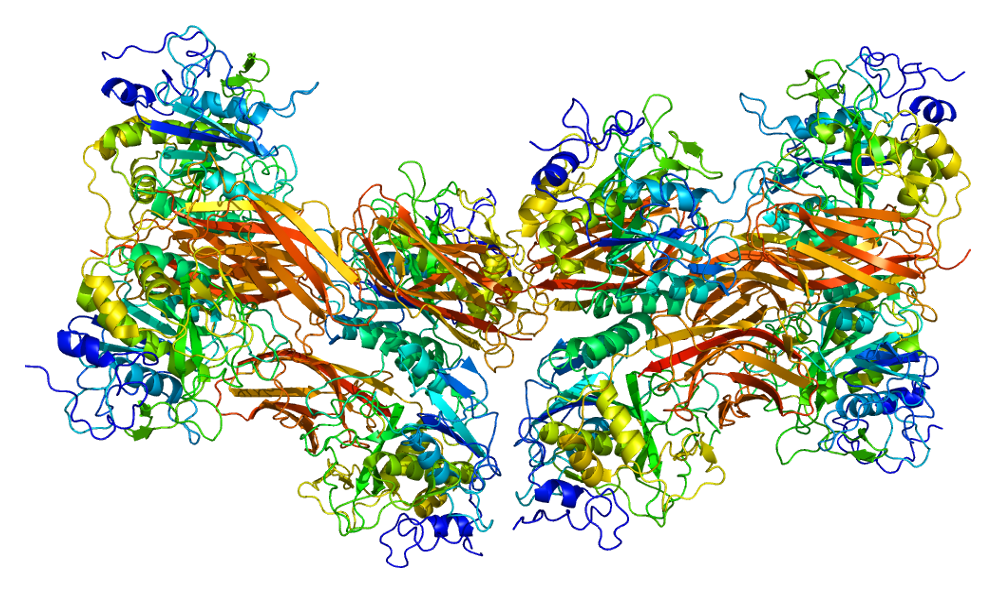

Identifiers
- Aliases: FURIN, FUR, PACE, PCSK3, SPC1, furin, paired basic amino acid cleaving enzyme
- External IDs: OMIM: 136950; MGI: 97513; GeneCards: FURIN
Available structures
PDB	Ortholog search: PDBe RCSB
PDB	List of PDB id codes 4OMC, 4OMD, 4RYD, 4Z2A
Enzyme activity
EC #	BRENDA	ExPASy	KEGG	MetaCyc
3.4.21.75	↗	↗	↗	↗

Gene location (Human)
Chr.	Chromosome 15 (human)
Band	15q26.1	Start	90,868,588 bp
Band	15q26.1	End	90,883,458 bp

Gene location (Mouse)
Chr.	Chromosome 7 (mouse)
Band	7 D2|7 45.65 cM	Start	80,038,333 bp
Band	7 D2|7 45.65 cM	End	80,055,184 bp
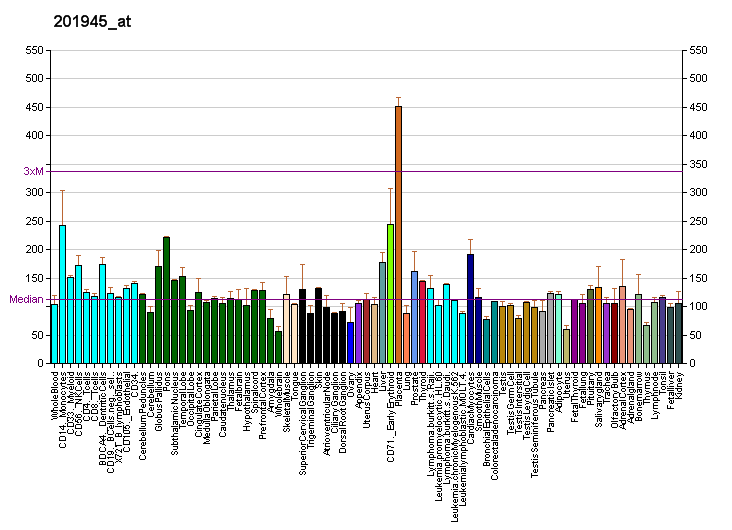
RNA expression pattern
Bgee	Human / Mouse (ortholog); Top expressed in: right lobe of liver; body of pancreas; right lung; right lobe of thyroid gland; left lobe of thyroid gland; apex of heart; skin of leg; upper lobe of left lung; salivary gland; anterior pituitary / Top expressed in: epithelium of stomach; Ileal epithelium; parotid gland; granulocyte; lip; right kidney; lactiferous gland; corneal stroma; extensor digitorum longus muscle; secondary oocyte; More reference expression data
BioGPS	More reference expression data
Gene ontology
Molecular function	nerve growth factor binding; peptide binding; metal ion binding; protease binding; peptidase activity; protein binding; serine-type endopeptidase inhibitor activity; serine-type peptidase activity; hydrolase activity; endopeptidase activity; serine-type endopeptidase activity
Cellular component	integral component of membrane; Golgi apparatus; membrane; plasma membrane; cell surface; trans-Golgi network; endoplasmic reticulum; Golgi lumen; membrane raft; trans-Golgi network transport vesicle; extracellular exosome; extracellular space; Golgi membrane; extracellular region; endosome; endosome membrane; integral component of Golgi membrane
Biological process	negative regulation of low-density lipoprotein particle receptor catabolic process; negative regulation of transforming growth factor beta1 production; viral life cycle; secretion by cell; peptide biosynthetic process; protein processing; positive regulation of membrane protein ectodomain proteolysis; extracellular matrix disassembly; extracellular matrix organization; viral protein processing; proteolysis; signal peptide processing; peptide hormone processing; regulation of signal transduction; regulation of protein catabolic process; collagen catabolic process; negative regulation of nerve growth factor production; nerve growth factor processing; nerve growth factor production; cell population proliferation; transforming growth factor beta receptor signaling pathway; regulation of endopeptidase activity; negative regulation of endopeptidase activity; cornification; zymogen activation; regulation of lipoprotein lipase activity; dibasic protein processing; zymogen inhibition; positive regulation of transforming growth factor beta1 activation
Sources:Amigo / QuickGO
Orthologs
Databases	NCBI: entry; OMA: entry
Species	Human	Mouse
Entrez	5045	18550
Ensembl	ENSG00000140564	ENSMUSG00000030530
UniProt	P09958	P23188
RefSeq (mRNA)	NM_002569; NM_001289823; NM_001289824	NM_001081454; NM_011046
RefSeq (protein)	NP_001276752; NP_001276753; NP_002560; NP_001369548; NP_001369549 NP_001369550; NP_001369551; NP_001276752.1; NP_001276753.1; NP_002560.1	NP_001074923; NP_035176
Location (UCSC)	Chr 15: 90.87 – 90.88 Mb	Chr 7: 80.04 – 80.06 Mb
PubMed search
- Wikidata
View/Edit Human	View/Edit Mouse

Furin is a protease, a proteolytic enzyme activated by substrate presentation that in humans and other animals is encoded by the FURIN gene. Some proteins are inactive when they are first synthesized, and must have sections removed in order to become active. Furin cleaves these sections and activates the proteins. It was named furin because it was in the upstream region of an oncogene known as FES. The gene was known as FUR (FES Upstream Region) and therefore the protein was named furin. Furin is also known as PACE (Paired basic Amino acid Cleaving Enzyme). A member of family S8, furin is a subtilisin-like peptidase.

== Function ==
The protein encoded by this gene is an enzyme that belongs to the subtilisin-like proprotein convertase family. The members of this family are proprotein convertases that process latent precursor proteins into their biologically active products. This encoded protein is a calcium-dependent serine endoprotease that can efficiently cleave precursor proteins at their paired basic amino acid processing sites. Some of its substrates are: proparathyroid hormone, transforming growth factor beta 1 precursor, proalbumin, pro-beta-secretase, membrane type-1 matrix metalloproteinase, beta subunit of pro-nerve growth factor and von Willebrand factor. A furin-like pro-protein convertase has been implicated in the processing of RGMc (also called hemojuvelin), a gene involved in a severe iron-overload disorder called juvenile hemochromatosis. Both the Ganz and Rotwein groups demonstrated that furin-like proprotein convertases (PPC) are responsible for conversion of 50 kDa HJV to a 40 kDa protein with a truncated COOH-terminus, at a conserved polybasic RNRR site. This suggests a potential mechanism to generate the soluble forms of HJV/hemojuvelin (s-hemojuvelin) found in the blood of rodents and humans.

The furin substrates and the locations of furin cleavage sites in protein sequences can be predicted by two bioinformatics methods: ProP and PiTou.

== Clinical significance ==
Furin is one of the proteases responsible for the proteolytic cleavage of HIV envelope polyprotein precursor gp160 to gp120 and gp41 prior to viral assembly. This protease is also thought to play a role in tumor progression. The use of alternate polyadenylation sites has been found for the FURIN gene.

Furin is enriched in the Golgi apparatus, where it functions to cleave other proteins into their mature/active forms. Furin cleaves proteins just downstream of a basic amino acid target sequence (canonically, Arg-X-(Arg/Lys) -Arg'). In addition to processing cellular precursor proteins, furin is also used by a number of pathogens. For example, the envelope proteins of viruses such as HIV, influenza, dengue fever, several filoviruses including ebola and marburg virus, and the spike protein of SARS-CoV-2, must be cleaved by furin or furin-like proteases to become fully functional. When SARS-CoV-2 virus is being synthesized in an infected cell, furin or furin-like proteases cleave the spike protein into two portions (S1 and S2), which remain associated.

Anthrax toxin, Pseudomonas exotoxin, and papillomaviruses must be processed by furin during their initial entry into host cells. Inhibitors of furin are under consideration as therapeutic agents for treating anthrax infection.

Furin is regulated by cholesterol and substrate presentation. When cholesterol is high, furin traffics to GM1 lipid rafts. When cholesterol is low, furin traffics to the disordered region. This is speculated to contribute to cholesterol and age dependent priming of SARS-CoV.

Expression of furin in T-cells is required for maintenance of peripheral immune tolerance.

== Interactions ==
Furin has been shown to interact with PACS1.
