= Membrane-bound transcription factor site-1 protease =

Mammalian protein found in Homo sapiens

MBTPS1

Identifiers
- Aliases: MBTPS1, membrane-bound transcription factor peptidase, site 1, PCSK8, S1P, SKI-1, membrane bound transcription factor peptidase, site 1, SEDKF
- External IDs: OMIM: 603355; MGI: 1927235; HomoloGene: 2808; GeneCards: MBTPS1; OMA:MBTPS1 - orthologs

Gene location (Human)
Chr.	Chromosome 16 (human)
Band	16q23.3-q24.1	Start	84,053,761 bp
Band	16q23.3-q24.1	End	84,116,942 bp

Gene location (Mouse)
Chr.	Chromosome 8 (mouse)
Band	8|8 E1	Start	120,234,895 bp
Band	8|8 E1	End	120,285,474 bp
RNA expression pattern
Bgee	Human / Mouse (ortholog); Top expressed in: stromal cell of endometrium; pituitary gland; left ovary; anterior pituitary; cerebellar hemisphere; right hemisphere of cerebellum; right ovary; islet of Langerhans; right uterine tube; right lobe of thyroid gland / Top expressed in: saccule; molar; Gonadal ridge; otic vesicle; otic placode; tail of embryo; efferent ductule; calvaria; vas deferens; medullary collecting duct; More reference expression data
BioGPS	n/a
Gene ontology
Molecular function	endopeptidase activity; peptidase activity; serine-type peptidase activity; hydrolase activity; serine-type endopeptidase activity; metalloendopeptidase activity
Cellular component	integral component of membrane; Golgi apparatus; endoplasmic reticulum lumen; membrane; Golgi membrane; endoplasmic reticulum; Golgi stack; endoplasmic reticulum membrane
Biological process	steroid metabolic process; lipid metabolism; cholesterol metabolic process; response to endoplasmic reticulum stress; proteolysis; ATF6-mediated unfolded protein response; membrane protein intracellular domain proteolysis; lysosome organization; endoplasmic reticulum unfolded protein response; post-translational protein modification; regulation of cholesterol biosynthetic process; protein import into nucleus
Sources:Amigo / QuickGO
Orthologs
Species	Human	Mouse
Entrez	8720	56453
Ensembl	ENSG00000140943	ENSMUSG00000031835
UniProt	Q14703	Q9WTZ2
RefSeq (mRNA)	NM_201268; NM_003791	NM_001167910; NM_019709
RefSeq (protein)	NP_003782	NP_001161382; NP_062683
Location (UCSC)	Chr 16: 84.05 – 84.12 Mb	Chr 8: 120.23 – 120.29 Mb
PubMed search
- Wikidata
View/Edit Human	View/Edit Mouse

Membrane-bound transcription factor site-1 protease, or site-1 protease (S1P) for short, also known as subtilisin/kexin-isozyme 1 (SKI-1), is an enzyme (EC 3.4.21.112) that in humans is encoded by the MBTPS1 gene. S1P cleaves the endoplasmic reticulum loop of sterol regulatory element-binding protein (SREBP) transcription factors.

== Function ==
This gene encodes a member of the subtilisin-like proprotein convertase family, which includes proteases that process protein and peptide precursors trafficking through regulated or constitutive branches of the secretory pathway. The encoded protein undergoes an initial autocatalytic processing event in the endoplasmic reticulum (ER) to generate a heterodimer which exits the ER and sorts to the cis/medial-Golgi where a second autocatalytic event takes place and the catalytic activity is acquired. It encodes a type 1 membrane bound protease which is ubiquitously expressed and regulates cholesterol or lipid homeostasis via cleavage of substrates at non-basic residues.

== Clinical significance ==
Mutations in this gene may be associated with lysosomal dysfunction.

== See also ==
- Membrane-bound transcription factor site-2 protease
