= PCSK4 =

Protein-coding gene in the species Homo sapiens

Identifiers
- Aliases: PCSK4, PC4, SPC5, proprotein convertase subtilisin/kexin type 4
- External IDs: OMIM: 600487; MGI: 97514; HomoloGene: 22495; GeneCards: PCSK4; OMA:PCSK4 - orthologs

Gene location (Human)
Chr.	Chromosome 19 (human)
Band	19p13.3	Start	1,481,428 bp
Band	19p13.3	End	1,490,752 bp

Gene location (Mouse)
Chr.	Chromosome 10 (mouse)
Band	10 C1|10 39.72 cM	Start	80,321,283 bp
Band	10 C1|10 39.72 cM	End	80,329,498 bp
RNA expression pattern
Bgee	Human / Mouse (ortholog); Top expressed in: left testis; right testis; right uterine tube; testicle; anterior pituitary; right lobe of liver; right frontal lobe; right lobe of thyroid gland; left lobe of thyroid gland; olfactory zone of nasal mucosa / Top expressed in: spermatid; spermatocyte; seminiferous tubule; internal carotid artery; external carotid artery; neural layer of retina; outer nuclear layer; embryo; proximal tubule; embryo; More reference expression data
BioGPS	n/a
Gene ontology
Molecular function	peptidase activity; serine-type peptidase activity; hydrolase activity; protein binding; serine-type endopeptidase activity
Cellular component	integral component of membrane; membrane; acrosomal membrane; cytoplasmic vesicle; acrosomal vesicle; trans-Golgi network; integral component of Golgi membrane
Biological process	proteolysis; binding of sperm to zona pellucida; sperm capacitation; acrosome reaction; fertilization; reproductive process; protein processing; peptide hormone processing
Sources:Amigo / QuickGO
Orthologs
Species	Human	Mouse
Entrez	54760	18551
Ensembl	ENSG00000115257	ENSMUSG00000020131
UniProt	Q6UW60	P29121
RefSeq (mRNA)	NM_017573; NM_001395257	NM_008793
RefSeq (protein)	NP_060043	NP_032819
Location (UCSC)	Chr 19: 1.48 – 1.49 Mb	Chr 10: 80.32 – 80.33 Mb
PubMed search
- Wikidata
View/Edit Human	View/Edit Mouse

Proprotein convertase subtilisin/kexin type 4 is an enzyme that in humans is encoded by the PCSK4 gene.
