= Subtilisin =

Proteolytic enzyme found in Bacillus subtilis

Peptidase S8, subtilisin-related
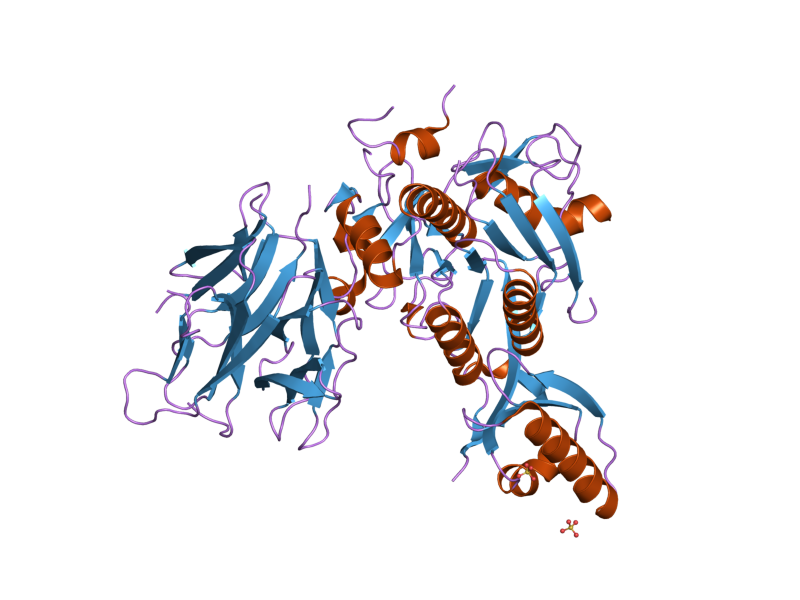
- S8 + I9 (lower-right), Bacillus subtilis (PDB: 2pmw)

Identifiers
- Symbol: Peptidase_S8
- Pfam: PF00082
- InterPro: IPR015500
- PROSITE: PDOC00125
- CATH: 1cse
- SCOP2: 1cse / SCOPe / SUPFAM
- CDD: cd07477
Available protein structures:
- PDB: IPR015500 PF00082 (ECOD; PDBsum)
- AlphaFold: IPR015500; PF00082

Subtilisin BPN'
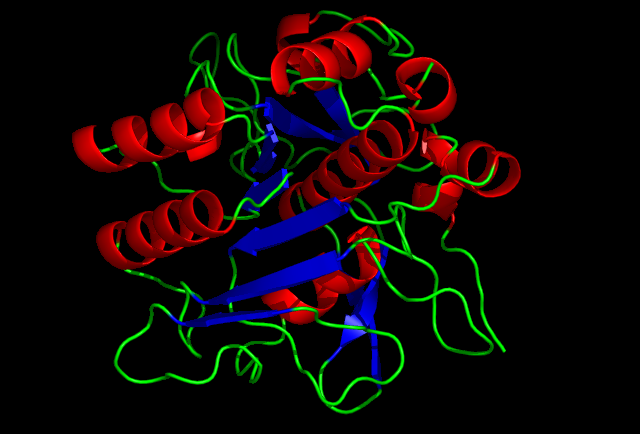
- Crystal structure of subtilisin S8 domain.

Identifiers
- Organism: Bacillus amyloliquefaciens
- Symbol: apr
- CAS number: 9014-01-1
- Entrez: 5712479
- PDB: 1st2 More structures
- UniProt: P00782

Other data
- EC number: 3.4.21.62
Search for
- Structures: Swiss-model
- Domains: InterPro

Subtilisin is a protease (a protein-digesting enzyme) initially obtained from Bacillus subtilis.

Subtilisins belong to subtilases, a group of serine proteases that – like all serine proteases – initiate the nucleophilic attack on the peptide (amide) bond through a serine residue at the active site. Subtilisins typically have molecular weights 27kDa. They can be obtained from certain types of soil bacteria, for example, Bacillus amyloliquefaciens from which they are secreted in large amounts.

== Nomenclature ==
"Subtilisin" does not refer to a single protein, but to an entire clade under subtilases containing the classical subtilisins. The clade can be further divided into four groups: "true subtilisins" (containing the classical members), "high-alkaline subtilisins", "intracellular subtilisins", and "phylogenetically intermediate subtilisins" (PIS). Notable subtilisins include:

Family	Organism	Uniprot	Names	Notes
True	B. licheniformis	P00780	Subtilisin Carlsberg, Alcalase (Novozymes), Maxatase (?) "subtilisin DY" (X-ray mutant)	Type serine endopeptidase of MEROPS family S8.
?	B. licheniformis	?	Endocut-02L (Tailorzyme ApS)	
?	?	?	bioprase, bioprase AL	
?	Lederbergia lenta		Esperase (Novozymes)	Structure determined, but not found on PDB.
High-alkaline	Lederbergia lenta	P29600	Subtilisin Savinase, subtilisin lentus, Savinase (Novozymes)	PDB: 1SVN
True	B. amyloliquefaciens	P00782	Subtilisin BPN', Alcalase (Novozymes)	
True	Geobacillus stearothermophilus	P29142	Subtilisin J, Thermoase (Amano)	
True	B. subtilis subsp. natto	P35835	Subtilisin NAT, Subtilisin QK, MEROPS S08.044, nattokinase	PDB: 4DWW

Other non-commercial names include ALK-enzyme, bacillopeptidase, Bacillus subtilis alkaline proteinase, colistinase, genenase I, protease XXVII, subtilopeptidase, kazusase, protease VIII, protin A 3L, protease S.

Other commercial names with unidentified molecular identities include SP 266, orientase 10B (HBI Enzymes), Progress (Novozyme), Liquanase (Novozyme).

== Structure ==
The structure of subtilisin has been determined by X-ray crystallography. The mature form is a 275-residue globular protein with several alpha-helices, and a large beta-sheet. The N-terminal contains an I9 propeptide domain (InterPro: IPR010259) that assists the folding of subtilisin. Proteolytic removal of the domain activates the enzyme. It is structurally unrelated to the chymotrypsin-clan of serine proteases, but uses the same type of catalytic triad in the active site. This makes it a classic example of convergent evolution.

== Mechanism of catalysis ==
The active site features a charge-relay network involving Asp-32, His-64, and active site Ser-221 arranged in a catalytic triad. The charge-relay network functions as follows: The carboxylate side-chain of Asp-32 hydrogen-bonds to a nitrogen-bonded proton on His-64's imidazole ring. This is possible because Asp is negatively charged at physiological pH. The other nitrogen on His-64 hydrogen-bonds to the O-H proton of Ser-221. This last interaction results in charge-separation of O-H, with the oxygen atom being more nucleophilic. This allows the oxygen atom of Ser-221 to attack incoming substrates (i.e., peptide bonds), assisted by a neighboring carboxyamide side-chain of Asn-155.

Even though Asp-32, His-64, and Ser-221 are sequentially far apart, they converge in the 3D structure to form the active site.

To summarize the interactions described above, Ser-221 acts as a nucleophile and cleaves peptide bonds with its partially negative oxygen atom. This is possible due to the nature of the charge-relay site of subtilisin.

== Applications ==
=== Research tool ===
In molecular biology using B. subtilis as a model organism, the gene encoding subtilisin (aprE) is often the second gene of choice after amyE for integrating reporter constructs into, due to its dispensability.

=== Commercial ===
Protein-engineered subtilisins are widely used in commercial products (the native enzyme is easily inactivated by detergents and high temperatures) and is also called a stain cutter, for example, in laundry and dishwashing detergents, cosmetics, food processing, skin care products, contact lens cleaners, and for research in synthetic organic chemistry.

=== Occupational safety and health ===
People can be exposed to subtilisin in the workplace by breathing it in, swallowing it, skin contact, and eye contact. The National Institute for Occupational Safety and Health (NIOSH) has set a recommended exposure limit (REL) of 60 ng/m^{3} over a 60-minute period.

Subtilisin can cause "enzymatic detergent asthma". People who are sensitive to Subtilisin (Alcalase) usually are also allergic to the bacterium Bacillus subtilis.

== See also ==
- Keratinase
