= Thebacon =

Opioid medication

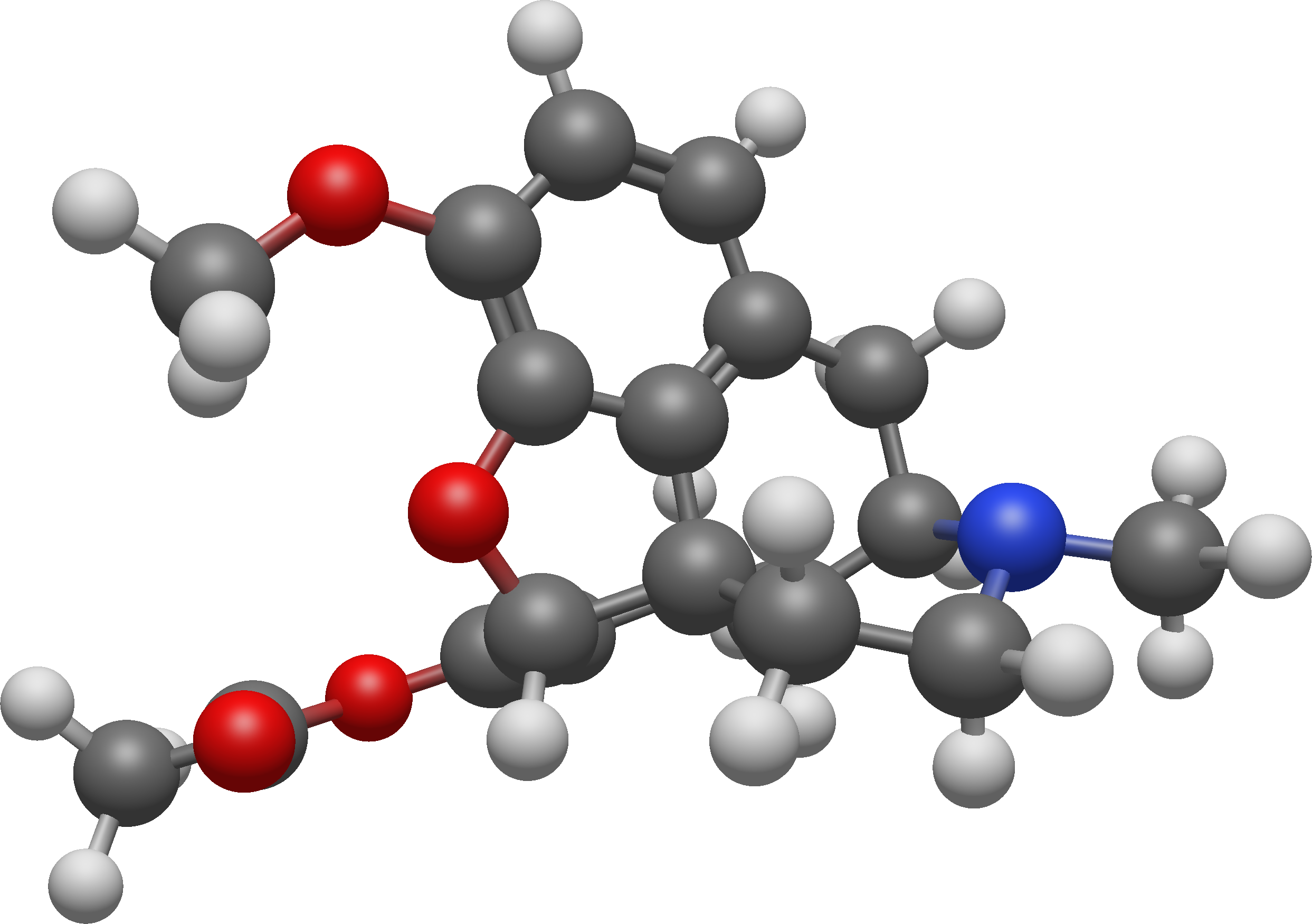

Clinical data
- AHFS/Drugs.com: International Drug Names
- ATC code: R05DA10 (WHO)

Legal status
- Legal status: AU: S8 (Controlled drug); BR: Class A1 (Narcotic drugs); CA: Schedule I; DE: Anlage II (Authorized trade only, not prescriptible); US: Schedule I

Identifiers
- IUPAC name: 6,7-Didehydro-4,5α-epoxy-3-methoxy-17-methylmorphinan-6-ol acetate
- CAS Number: 466-90-0
- PubChem CID: 11508377
- ChemSpider: 9683173
- UNII: 520D430GDK
- KEGG: D07386
- ChEMBL: ChEMBL2104751
- CompTox Dashboard (EPA): DTXSID90891944
- ECHA InfoCard: 100.006.708

Chemical and physical data
- Formula: C_{20}H_{23}NO_{4}
- Molar mass: 341.407 g·mol^{−1}
- 3D model (JSmol): Interactive image
- SMILES: CC(=O)OC1=CC[C@H]2[C@H]3CC4=C5[C@]2([C@H]1OC5=C(C=C4)OC)CCN3C
- InChI: InChI=1S/C20H23NO4/c1-11(22)24-16-7-5-13-14-10-12-4-6-15(23-3)18-17(12)20(13,19(16)25-18)8-9-21(14)2/h4,6-7,13-14,19H,5,8-10H2,1-3H3/t13-,14+,19-,20-/m0/s1; Key:RRJQTGHQFYTZOW-ILWKUFEGSA-N

Thebacon (INN; pronounced /ˈθiːbəkɒn/), or dihydrocodeinone enol acetate, is a semisynthetic opioid that is similar to hydrocodone and is most commonly synthesised from thebaine. Thebacon was invented in Germany in 1924, four years after the first synthesis of hydrocodone. Thebacon is a derivative of acetyldihydrocodeine, where only the 6–7 double bond is saturated. Thebacon is marketed as its hydrochloride salt under the trade name Acedicon, and as its bitartrate under Diacodin and other trade names. The hydrochloride salt has a free base conversion ratio of 0.846. Other salts used in research and other settings include thebacon's phosphate, hydrobromide, citrate, hydroiodide, and sulfate.

== Medical uses ==
Thebacon is an opioid agonist narcotic analgesic of the middle range and a strong antitussive, primarily used in Europe, although it is no longer in common use. Currently, dihydrocodeine and nicocodeine are used as second-line codeine replacements. The other dihydromorphinone used as an antitussive is hydromorphone (Dilaudid cough syrup); the other narcotic antitussives are either more directly related to codeine or not related at all (open chain methadone relatives and thiambutenes).

Thebacon is indicated for moderate to moderately severe pain and dry painful coughing, like hydrocodone. It has a duration of action in the range of 5 to 9 hours and doses typically start at 5 mg q6h. For both pain and coughing, thebacon can be made more effective along with NSAIDs, muscle relaxants, and/or antihistamines like tripelennamine, hydroxyzine, promethazine, phenyltoloxamine and chlorpheniramine.

=== Pharmacokinetics ===
Thebacon is most commonly taken orally as an elixir, tablet, or capsule, although rectal and subcutaneous administration has the same advantages with hydrocodone as would taking a tablet, powder, or a liquid concentrate buccally or sublingually. Like all of its chemical relatives in this class (codeine-based semi-synthetic narcotic antitussives), thebacon exerts its analgesic effect and a large part of its antitussive and antiperistaltic action as a prodrug for stronger and/or longer-lasting opioids, primarily hydromorphone, which is formed in the liver by the cytochrome P450 2D6 (CYP2D6) enzyme pathway as well as acetylmorphone. As a result, the effectiveness of a given dose of thebacon will vary amongst patients, and some food and drugs can affect various parts of the liberation, absorption, distribution, metabolism and elimination profile, and therefore a variable proportion of the potency of thebacon. Thebacon can be said to be the 6-monoacetylmorphine analog of hydrocodone, and/or the 6-acetylmorphone analog of codeine. It is also a close structural relative of 3,14-diacetyloxymorphone.

Thebacon's analgesic and antitussive potency is slightly higher than that of its parent compound hydrocodone, which gives it approximately eight times the milligram strength of codeine. The acetylation at position 3 and the conversion into a dihydromorphinone class semisynthetic (at position 14 on the morphine carbon skeleton) allows for the drug to more rapidly enter the central nervous system in greater quantity where it is de-acetylated into hydromorphone, and also converted by other processes into hydromorphinol, morphine and various other active and inactive substances; it therefore simultaneously takes advantage of two methods of increasing the effectiveness of morphine and its derivatives, those being catalytic hydrogenation (codeine into hydrocodone) and esterification (morphine into diamorphine, nicomorphine &c) in a manner not unlike to that of dihydrodiacetylmorphine.

== Production ==
Thebacon is generated by the esterification product of the enol tautomer of hydrocodone (dihydrocodeineone) with acetic anhydride. Although modification of thebaine is the most common way of making thebacon, preparation by refluxing hydrocodone with acetic anhydride is not uncommon, generally similar to how diacetylmorphine is produced. It is also a product of the metabolism of hydrocodone by Pseudomonas putida M10, the bacterium used for oil spill remediation. This also produces a morphinone reductase, which can turn morphine into hydromorphone in a process which produces other active opioids, such as oxymorphone, oxymorphol, or hydromorphinol as intermediates.

== Legal status ==
Thebacon is a Schedule I controlled substance in the United States, never having been in medical use there. The US DEA Administrative Controlled Substance Control Number assigned by the Controlled Substances Act (1970) for thebacon and all of its salts is 9315.

== See also ==
- Pharmacology
- Opioid
- Hydrocodone
- Benzhydrocodone
- Myrophine
