= C19H21NO5 =

The molecular formula C_{19}H_{21}NO_{5} (molar mass : 343.379 g/mol) may refer to:

- 3-Acetyloxymorphone
- Osemozotan
