= Nicocodeine =

Opioid analgesic and antitussive drug

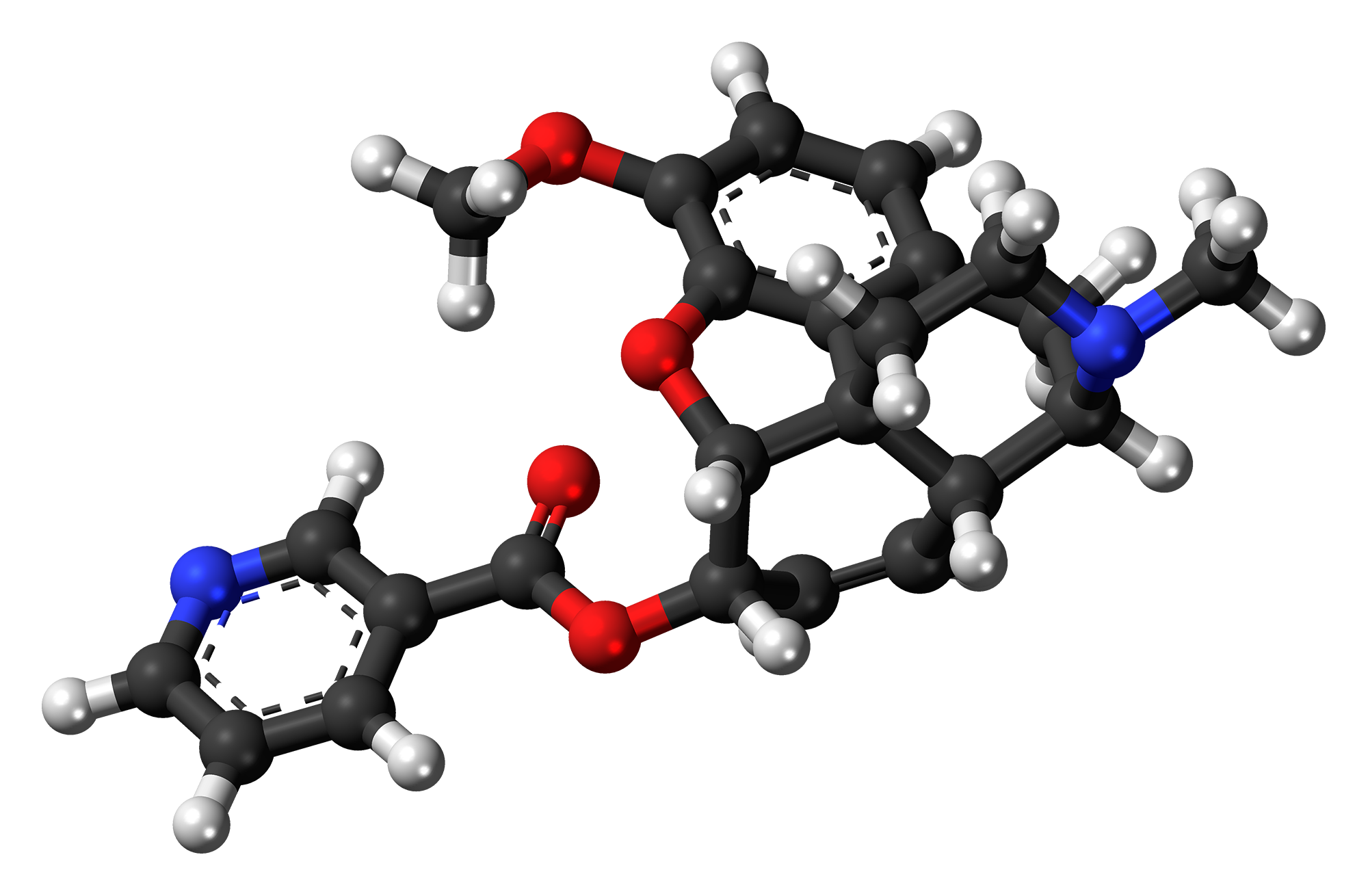

Clinical data
- Other names: 6-Nicotinoylcodeine
- Routes of administration: Oral, intravenous
- ATC code: none

Legal status
- Legal status: AU: S9 (Prohibited substance); BR: Class A2 (Narcotic drugs); CA: Schedule I; DE: Anlage II (Authorized trade only, not prescriptible); UK: Class B; US: Schedule I

Identifiers
- IUPAC name: (5α,6α)-3-methoxy-17-methyl-7,8-didehydro-4,5-epoxymorphinan-6-yl nicotinate
- CAS Number: 3688-66-2 58263-01-7 (HCl)
- PubChem CID: 5463872
- ChemSpider: 4576411
- UNII: DYX391P13E
- KEGG: D08272
- CompTox Dashboard (EPA): DTXSID10190360
- ECHA InfoCard: 100.020.900

Chemical and physical data
- Formula: C_{24}H_{24}N_{2}O_{4}
- Molar mass: 404.466 g·mol^{−1}
- 3D model (JSmol): Interactive image
- SMILES: O=C(O[C@H]2\C=C/[C@H]5[C@@H]4N(CC[C@@]51c3c(O[C@H]12)c(OC)ccc3C4)C)c6cccnc6
- InChI: InChI=1S/C24H24N2O4/c1-26-11-9-24-16-6-8-19(29-23(27)15-4-3-10-25-13-15)22(24)30-21-18(28-2)7-5-14(20(21)24)12-17(16)26/h3-8,10,13,16-17,19,22H,9,11-12H2,1-2H3/t16-,17+,19-,22-,24-/m0/s1; Key:RYBGRHAWFUVMST-MJFIPZRTSA-N

Nicocodeine (Lyopect, Tusscodin) is an opioid analgesic and cough suppressant, an ester of codeine closely related to dihydrocodeine and the codeine analogue of nicomorphine. It is not commonly used in most countries, but has activity similar to other opiates. Nicocodeine and nicomorphine were synthesized in 1904, and introduced in 1957 by Lannacher Heilmittel of Austria. Nicocodeine is metabolised in the liver by demethylation to produce nicomorphine, also known as 6-nicotinoylmorphine, and subsequently further metabolised to morphine. Side effects are similar to those of other opiates and include itching, nausea and respiratory depression. Related opioid analogues such as nicomorphine and nicodicodeine were first synthesized. The definitive synthesis, which involves treating anhydrous codeine base with nicotinic anhydride at 130 °C, was published by Pongratz and Zirm in Monatshefte für Chemie in 1957, simultaneously with the two analogues in an article about amides and esters of various organic acids.

Nicocodeine is almost always used as the hydrochloride salt, which has a free base conversion ratio of .917. In the past, the tartrate, bitartrate, phosphate, hydrobromide, methiodide, hydroiodide, and sulfate were used in research or as pharmaceuticals.

Nicocodeine is regulated in most cases as is codeine and similar weak opiate drugs like ethylmorphine, benzylmorphine, dihydrocodeine and its other close derivatives like acetyldihydrocodeine (although not the stronger hydrocodone or oxycodone, which are regulated like morphine) and others of this class in the laws of countries and the Single Convention On Narcotic Drugs. One notable example is the fact that nicocodeine is a Schedule I/Narcotic controlled substance in the United States along with heroin as nicocodeine was never introduced for medical use in the United States.

Nicodicodeine is a similar drug which is to nicocodeine as dihydrocodeine is to codeine. The metabolites of nicodicodeine include dihydromorphine where nicocodeine is turned into morphine as noted above.

Nicocodeine cough medicines are available as syrups, extended-release syrups, and sublingual drops. Analgesic preparations are also in the form of sublingual drops and tablets for oral administration. Nicocodeine is approximately the same strength as hydrocodone; it has a faster onset of action.

The 2013 DEA annual production quota for nicocodeine and its two related drugs are zero. Nicocodeine's ACSCN is 9309. Nicodicodeine is not assigned an ACSCN and is presumably controlled as either an ester of dihydromorphine or derivative of nicomorphine.
