= C24H26N2O4 =

The molecular formula C_{24}H_{26}N_{2}O_{4} (molar mass: 406.474 g/mol) may refer to:

- Carvedilol, a non-selective beta blocker/alpha-1 blocker indicated in the treatment of mild to moderate congestive heart failure
- Nicodicodeine, an opiate derivative developed as a cough suppressant and analgesic
