= C25H25NO4 =

The molecular formula C_{25}H_{25}NO_{4} (molar mass: 403.47 g/mol, exact mass: 403.1784 u) may refer to:

- Benzhydrocodone
- 7-Spiroindanyloxymorphone (SIOM)
