= 3,14-Diacetyloxymorphone =

Names
- IUPAC name 17-Methyl-6-oxo-4,5α-epoxymorphinan-3,14-diyl diacetate
- Systematic IUPAC name (4R,4aS,7aR,12bS)-3-Methyl-7-oxo-2,3,4,4a,5,6,7,7a-octahydro-1H-4,12-methano[1]benzofuro[3,2-e]isoquinoline-4a,9-diyl diacetate

Identifiers
CAS Number	64643-76-1
3D model (JSmol)	Interactive image
ChemSpider	21162163
ECHA InfoCard	100.059.063
EC Number	264-989-2
PubChem CID	56843406
UNII	EA7YNB52TR
CompTox Dashboard (EPA)	DTXSID70983250
- InChI: InChI=1S/C21H23NO6/c1-11(23)26-15-5-4-13-10-16-21(28-12(2)24)7-6-14(25)19-20(21,8-9-22(16)3)17(13)18(15)27-19/h4-5,16,19H,6-10H2,1-3H3/t16-,19+,20+,21-/m1/s1 Key: OPPSZLCGCWIRIA-MBPVOVBZSA-N; InChI=1/C21H23NO6/c1-11(23)26-15-5-4-13-10-16-21(28-12(2)24)7-6-14(25)19-20(21,8-9-22(16)3)17(13)18(15)27-19/h4-5,16,19H,6-10H2,1-3H3/t16-,19+,20+,21-/m1/s1 Key: OPPSZLCGCWIRIA-MBPVOVBZBD
- SMILES: CN1[C@H](C2)[C@@]3(OC(C)=O)[C@@]4(CC1)C5=C2C=CC(OC(C)=O)=C5O[C@@]4([H])C(CC3)=O

Properties
Chemical formula	C_{21}H_{23}NO_{6}
Molar mass	385.416 g·mol^{−1}

Hazards
- GHS labelling
Pictograms	(GHS06: Toxic)
Signal word	Danger
Hazard statements	H300, H310
Precautionary statements	P260, P262, P264, P270, P271, P280, P284, P301+P310, P302+P350, P304+P340, P310, P320, P321, P330, P361, P363, P403+P233, P405, P501
- Except where otherwise noted, data are given for materials in their standard state (at 25 °C [77 °F], 100 kPa). Infobox references

3,14-Diacetyloxymorphone is an opioid analgesic which has never been marketed. It is an acetyl derivative of oxymorphone. It is related to other acetylated morphone derivatives, including 3,6-diacetyloxymorphone, 3,8,14-triacetyloxymorphone, 3,6,8,14-tetraacetyloxymorphone, noroxymorphone analogs of all or most of the above, and 3,6,14-triacetyloxymorphone, a derivative of oxymorphone whose structure-activity relationship suggests is 800% the potency of the parent drug versus 250% for 3,14-diacetyoxymorphone. Both were developed in Austria in the 1920s along with other derivatives of the strong dihydromorphinones and these drugs are generated by reacting oxymorphone with either acetic anhydride or acetyl chloride at various temperatures in the 80-160 °C for several hours; 3,6,14-triacetyloxymorphone may be more easily made when a catalyst is used but elevated pressure or reaction in vacuo or under a nitrogen or noble gas atmosphere is not required.^{[Citation Needed]}

As an ester of oxymorphone, it is presumably a Schedule II controlled substance as it and its relatives save acetylmorphone do not specifically appear in Schedule I. 3,14-Diacetyloxymorphone and its relatives including acetylmorphone do not, however, have annual production quotas published by the DEA in the Federal Register.^{[Citation Needed]}

Like all or most of the direct morphine derivatives, halogenated derivatives of these drugs and their hydromorphone and hydromorphinol analogues were synthesized in the 1930s when both the esters and the halogenated morphine derivatives were being developed, including one given as 1,2-iodo-3,6,14-triacetyl-6ɑ-14β-hydroxydihydromorphinone in a footnote to a 1948 German medical journal article about the esters of morphine. It appears that this drug was used, labelled with Iodine 129, as a tracer in animal studies, was significantly stronger than morphine, and possibly has 1- and/or 2- fluoro, chloro, and bromo analogues.[Citation Needed]

3,6-Diacetyloxymorphone is a third acetylated oxymorphone derivative, the oxymorphone analogue of acetylmorphone and expected to be intermediate in strength betwixt the two aforementioned drugs. Another is 3-acetyloxymorphone. ^{[Citation Needed]} All of the above have been, owing to their somewhat sophisticated yet straightforward synthesis from pharmaceutical opioids, consistently if in vanishingly small quantities since at least the 1960s by law enforcement around the world as the results of clandestine synthesis, and acetylmorphone itself was banned by the League of Nations in 1930 to prevent its use as a legal heroin substitute.^{[Citation Needed][Relevance]} Therefore, all or most of this group and its hydromorphone analogues along with some others more closely related to heroin such as acetylpropionylmorphine were the first designer drugs in the 1920s.
