= Co-dydramol =

Combination drug

Combination of
- Dihydrocodeine: Opioid analgesic
- Paracetamol: Non-opioid analgesic

Clinical data
- Routes of administration: Oral

Legal status
- Legal status: UK: POM and P

Pharmacokinetic data
- Bioavailability: ~20% (Oral)

Identifiers
- CAS Number: 867212-60-0

Co-dydramol (BAN) is a non-proprietary name used to denote a particular compound analgesic, a combination of dihydrocodeine tartrate and paracetamol. Co-dydramol tablets are used for the relief of moderate pain. Co-dydramol is part of a series of combination drugs available in the UK and other countries including co-codaprin (aspirin and codeine).

== Formulations ==
All formulations of co-dydramol contain 500 mg of paracetamol per tablet and may only be sold at a pharmacy as an over-the-counter item without prescription (a P medicine) if containing less than 7.5 mg of dihydrocodeine per tablet. Higher strengths are prescription only medicines. There are no GSL formulations of co-dydramol, as it is a Schedule 5 controlled drug. Four strengths of dihydrocodeine tartrate in each tablet are available:

- 7.46 mg dihydrocodeine as co-dydramol 7.46/500 (e.g. in the branded product Paramol).
- 10 mg dihydrocodeine as co-dydramol 10/500, this is also the preparation to be dispensed if no strength is specified on a prescription.
- 20 mg dihydrocodeine as co-dydramol 20/500 (e.g. branded products Paracod 500/20 and Remedeine).
- 30 mg dihydrocodeine as co-dydramol 30/500 (e.g. branded products Paracod 500/30 and Remedeine Forte).

== Metabolism ==
Dihydrocodeine is metabolised by the CYP450 system isoenzyme 2D6 to dihydromorphine, which mediates the majority of its analgesic effects. Owing to the low oral bioavailibility of dihydrocodeine (20%), and its subsequent metabolism to active compounds, it is likely that doses below 30mg are sub therapeutic for analgesia.

== See also ==
- Co-proxamol
- Co-codamol
- Co-codaprin
