= Acetylmorphone =

Opioid analgesic and cough suppressant drug

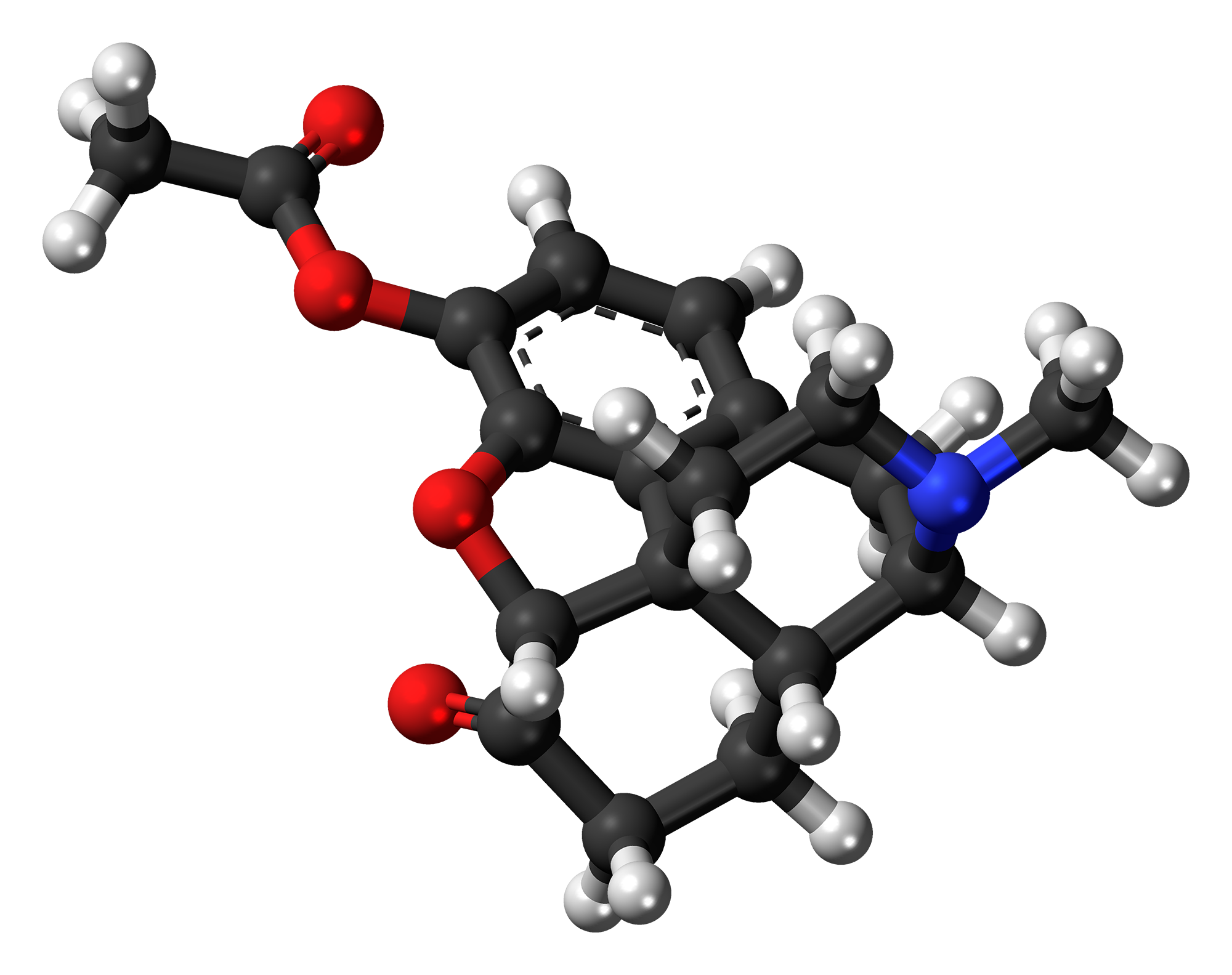

Clinical data
- Other names: Acetylmorphone, Dihydromorphinone acetate, 3-acetyl-7,8-dihydromorphin-6-one
- ATC code: none

Identifiers
- IUPAC name: 3-acetoxy-(5α,6α)-7,8-Didehydro-4,5-epoxy-17-methylmorphinan-6-one
- CAS Number: 14696-22-1
- PubChem CID: 625177
- ChemSpider: 21106250
- UNII: NBH9NY8MAD

Chemical and physical data
- Formula: C_{19}H_{21}NO_{4}
- Molar mass: 327.380 g·mol^{−1}
- 3D model (JSmol): Interactive image
- SMILES: CC(=O)Oc4ccc5C[C@H]1[N@](C)CC[C@@]23c5c4O[C@H]3C(=O)CC[C@@H]12
- InChI: InChI=1S/C19H21NO4/c1-10(21)23-15-6-3-11-9-13-12-4-5-14(22)18-19(12,7-8-20(13)2)16(11)17(15)24-18/h3,6,12-13,18H,4-5,7-9H2,1-2H3/t12-,13+,18-,19-/m0/s1; Key:QVIUKMVKLLVCDU-ATNYCFDYSA-N

Acetylmorphone (dihydromorphinone acetate) is an opiate analogue that is an acetylated derivative of hydromorphone which was developed in the early 1900s as a potential cough suppressant and analgesic. It is prepared by the acetylation of hydromorphone using either acetyl chloride or acetic anhydride. It was banned internationally in 1930 by the Health Committee of the League of Nations, in order to prevent its sale as an analogue of heroin.

Acetylmorphone is not currently used in medicine, but may have a higher bioavailability than hydromorphone due to its greater lipid solubility, and hence is likely to be more potent than the parent drug, although probably slower acting due to the requirement for deacetylation to the active metabolite hydromorphone. It can be expected to have similar side effects to other opiates, which would include itching, nausea and respiratory depression.
