= Nicomorphine =

Opioid analgesic drug

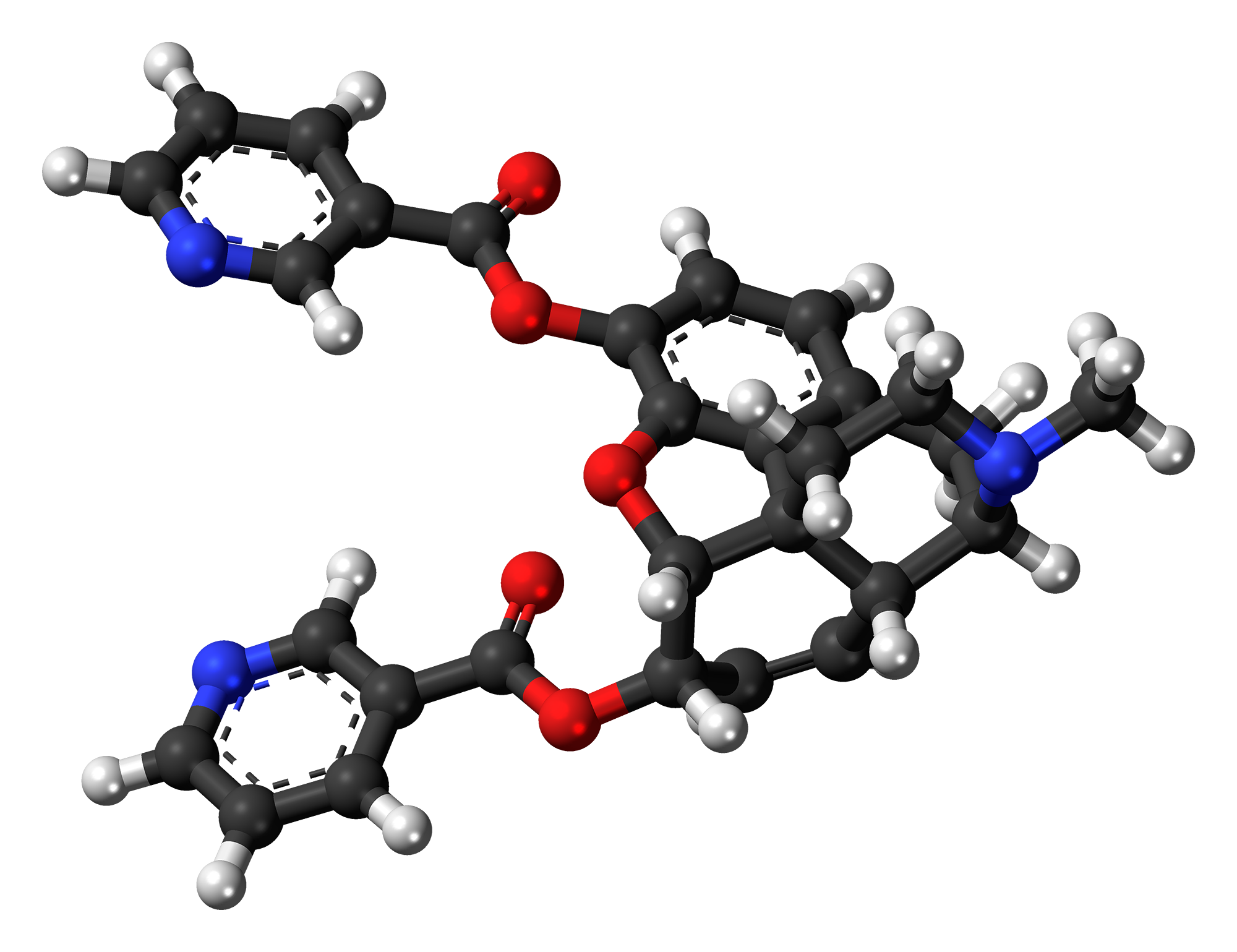

Clinical data
- Other names: Morphine dinicotinate, 3,6-dinicotinoylmorphine
- AHFS/Drugs.com: International Drug Names
- Routes of administration: Oral, Intravenous, Rectal
- ATC code: N02AA04 (WHO)

Legal status
- Legal status: AU: S9 (Prohibited substance); BR: Class A1 (Narcotic drugs); CA: Schedule I; DE: Anlage I (Authorized scientific use only); UK: Class A; US: Schedule I

Identifiers
- CAS Number: 639-48-5
- PubChem CID: 5362460
- ChemSpider: 4515048
- UNII: Y95FRL95FW
- KEGG: D07285
- CompTox Dashboard (EPA): DTXSID00213517
- ECHA InfoCard: 100.010.326

Chemical and physical data
- Formula: C_{29}H_{25}N_{3}O_{5}
- Molar mass: 495.535 g·mol^{−1}
- 3D model (JSmol): Interactive image
- SMILES: O=C(O[C@H]2\C=C/[C@H]6[C@@H]5N(CC[C@@]61c4c(O[C@H]12)c(OC(=O)c3cccnc3)ccc4C5)C)c7cccnc7
- InChI: InChI=1S/C29H25N3O5/c1-32-13-10-29-20-7-9-23(36-28(34)19-5-3-12-31-16-19)26(29)37-25-22(8-6-17(24(25)29)14-21(20)32)35-27(33)18-4-2-11-30-15-18/h2-9,11-12,15-16,20-21,23,26H,10,13-14H2,1H3/t20-,21+,23-,26-,29-/m0/s1; Key:HNDXBGYRMHRUFN-CIVUWBIHSA-N

Nicomorphine (Vilan, Subellan, Gevilan, MorZet) is the 3,6-dinicotinate ester of morphine. It is a strong opioid agonist analgesic two to three times as potent as morphine with a side effect profile similar to that of dihydromorphine, morphine, and diamorphine.

Nicomorphine was first synthesized in 1904 and was patented as Vilan by Lannacher Heilmittel G.m.b.H. of Austria in 1957.

== Medical Use ==
The hydrochloride salt is available as ampoules of 10 mg/ml solution for injection, 5 mg tablets, and 10 mg suppositories. It is possible that other manufacturers distribute 10 mg tablets and other concentrations of injectable nicomorphine in ampoules and multidose vials. It is used, particularly in the German-speaking countries and elsewhere in Central Europe and some other countries in Europe and the former USSR in particular, for post-operative, cancer, chronic non-malignant and other neuropathic pain. It is commonly used in patient-controlled analgesia (PCA) units. The usual starting dose is 5–10 mg given every 3–5 hours.

=== Side effects ===
Nicomorphine's side effects are similar to those of other opioids and include itching, nausea and respiratory depression. It is considered by doctors to be one of the better analgesics for the comprehensive mitigation of suffering, as opposed to purely clouding the noxious pain stimulus, in the alleviation of chronic pain conditions.

== Chemistry ==
The method for synthesis of nicomorphine, which involves treating anhydrous morphine base with nicotinic anhydride at 130 °C, was published by Pongratz and Zirm in Monatshefte für Chemie in 1957, simultaneously with the two analogues nicocodeine and nicodicodeine in an article about amides and esters of various organic acids.

== Legality ==
Nicomorphine is regulated in much the same fashion as morphine worldwide but is a Schedule I controlled substance in the United States and was never introduced there.

Nicomorphine may appear on rare occasions on the European black market and other channels for unsupervised opioid users. It can be produced as part of a mixture of salts and derivatives of morphine by end users by means of treating morphine with nicotinic anhydride or related chemicals in an analogue of the heroin homebake process.

CAS number of hydrochloride: 35055-78-8
US DEA ACSCN: 9312
Free base conversion ratios of salts:
Nicomorphine Hydrochloride: 0.93

== Pharmacology ==
=== Pharmacodynamics ===
The 3,6-diesters of morphine are drugs with more rapid and complete central nervous system penetration due to increased lipid solubility and other structural considerations. The prototype for this subgroup of semi-synthetic opiates is heroin and the group also includes dipropanoylmorphine, diacetyldihydromorphine, disalicylmorphine and others. Whilst this produces an enhanced "bang", i.e. a faster and more sudden onset of action when the drug is administered intravenously, it cannot be distinguished from morphine via other routes, although the different side effect profile, including lower incidence of nausea, is very apparent.

=== Pharmacokinetics ===
Nicomorphine is rapidly metabolized when administered by the I.V. route, having a half-life of 3 minutes, into morphine and 6-nicotinoylmorphine, the secondary active metabolite. Half lives of the metabolites were 3–15 minutes for the nicotinoyl metabolite, and 135–190 minutes for morphine.

Via the epidural route, a much slower release from epidural space occurs and nicomorphine remains detectable for 1.5 hours or so, and has a longer effect of 18.2 +/- 10.1 hours due to slower release of the active metabolites, morphine and 6-nicotinoylmorphine. Half lives for those compounds is listed in the IV route.

Pharmacokinetics via the rectal route differ, and change metabolism. Eight minutes after administration, morphine appeared rapidly, and had a half life of 1.48 +/- 0.48h. This was in turn metabolized to morphine-3- and morphine-6-glucoranides after another 12 minutes, which had similar half-lives to one-another, at about 2.8h. No 6-mononicotinoylmorphine was found, and bioavailability of morphine and metabolic actives was 88%. No remaining nicomorphine was found in urine.
