= Co-codaprin =

Chemical compound

Combination of
- Codeine phosphate: Opioid analgesic
- Aspirin: Non-opioid analgesic, NSAID

Clinical data
- AHFS/Drugs.com: Micromedex Detailed Consumer Information
- Routes of administration: Oral

Legal status
- Legal status: UK: POM (Prescription only)

Identifiers
- CAS Number: 130320-48-8
- PubChem CID: 5748307
- ChemSpider: 21106279
- CompTox Dashboard (EPA): DTXSID80893917

Co-codaprin (BAN) is a compound analgesic, a combination of codeine phosphate with aspirin.

Co-codaprin tablets are used for mild to moderate pain.

== Preparations ==
=== Canada ===
AC&C is a related preparation of ASA, codeine phosphate, and caffeine in tablet form. The caffeine is intended to counteract drowsiness which may be caused by the codeine.

AC&C is available in different formulations containing varying amounts of codeine. Formulations containing 8 mg or less of codeine ("AC&C 8" or "222") are typically available from pharmacies over the counter. A prescription is not required, but the medication must be requested from the pharmacist. The "222" and higher numbers refer to the codeine narcotic content numbers as follows:

- 222 – contains 7.5 mg codeine
- 282 – contains 15 mg codeine
- 292 – contains 30 mg codeine
- 293 – contains 60 mg codeine

== See also ==
- Co-dydramol
- Co-codamol
- Co-proxamol
