= Acetyldihydrocodeine =

Opioid analgesic and cough suppressant drug

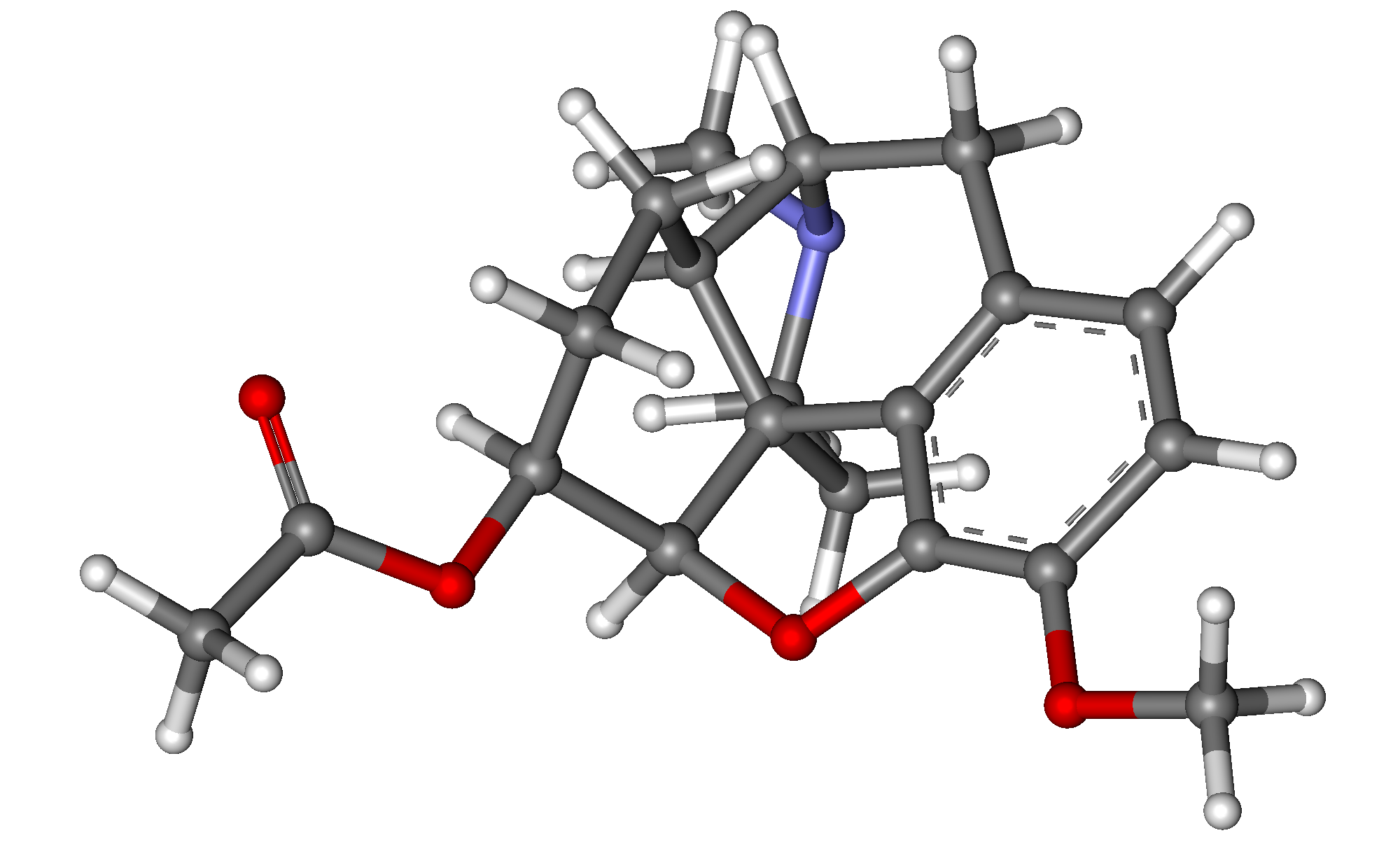

Clinical data
- Other names: Acetyldihydrocodeine, Dihydrothebacone, 6-acetyl-7,8-dihydrocodeine
- AHFS/Drugs.com: International Drug Names
- ATC code: R05DA12 (WHO)

Legal status
- Legal status: AU: S8 (Controlled); BR: Class A2 (Narcotic drugs); CA: Schedule I; DE: Anlage I (Authorized scientific use only); UK: Class B; US: Schedule I

Identifiers
- IUPAC name: 3-methoxy-6-acetoxy-(5α,6α)-4,5-epoxy-17-methylmorphinan
- CAS Number: 3861-72-1
- PubChem CID: 5463874
- DrugBank: DB01538
- ChemSpider: 4576412
- UNII: SGY1T84P34
- CompTox Dashboard (EPA): DTXSID30191930
- ECHA InfoCard: 100.021.253

Chemical and physical data
- Formula: C_{20}H_{25}NO_{4}
- Molar mass: 343.423 g·mol^{−1}
- 3D model (JSmol): Interactive image
- SMILES: O=C(O[C@@H]4[C@@H]5Oc1c2c(ccc1OC)C[C@H]3N(CC[C@]25[C@H]3CC4)C)C
- InChI: InChI=1S/C20H25NO4/c1-11(22)24-16-7-5-13-14-10-12-4-6-15(23-3)18-17(12)20(13,19(16)25-18)8-9-21(14)2/h4,6,13-14,16,19H,5,7-10H2,1-3H3/t13-,14+,16-,19-,20-/m0/s1; Key:LGGDXXJAGWBUSL-BKRJIHRRSA-N

Acetyldihydrocodeine is an opiate derivative discovered in Germany in 1914 and was used as a cough suppressant and analgesic. It is not commonly used, but has activity similar to other opiates. Acetyldihydrocodeine is a very close relative derivative of thebacon, where only the 6-7 bond is unsaturated. Acetyldihydrocodeine can be described as the 6-acetyl derivative of dihydrocodeine and is metabolised in the liver by demethylation and deacetylation to produce dihydromorphine.

Since acetyldihydrocodeine has higher lipophilicity than codeine and is converted into dihydromorphine rather than morphine, it can be expected to be more potent and longer-lasting. It also has a higher bioavailability than codeine. Side effects are similar to those of other opiates and include itching, nausea and respiratory depression.

Although an opioid of low to moderate strength and use in medicine elsewhere in the world, acetyldihydrocodeine is a Schedule I controlled substance in the United States. Its DEA Administrative Controlled Substances Control Number is 9051 and the one salt in use, acetyldihydrocodeine hydrochloride, has a freebase conversion ratio of 0.90.
