= Morphinone reductase =

Morphinone reductase is an enzyme which catalyzes the NADH-dependent saturation of the carbon-carbon double bond of morphinone and codeinone, yielding hydromorphone and hydrocodone respectively. This saturation reaction is assisted by a FMN cofactor and the enzyme is a member of the α/β-barrel flavoprotein family. The sequence of the enzyme has been obtained from bacteria Pseudomonas putida M10 and has been successfully expressed in yeast and other bacterial species. The enzyme is reported to harbor high sequence and structural similarity to the Old Yellow Enzyme, a large group of flavin-dependent redox biocatalysts of yeast species, and an oestrogen-binding protein of Candida albicans. The enzyme has demonstrated value in biosynthesis of semi-opiate drugs in microorganisms, expanding the chemical diversity of BIA biosynthesis.

== Enzyme structure ==
Morphinone reductase is a dimeric flavoenzyme comprising two 8-fold α/β-barrel domains, each with a non-covalently bound FMN prosthetic group located toward the center and C-terminal end of the barrel. At the active site, the Cys-191 residue serves as a proton donor in the oxidative half-reaction with a/ß unsaturated enones. Residues His-186 and Asn-189 are involved in ligand binding and they represent a conserved feature which is also observed in Old Yellow Enzymes. The residue Arg-238 contributes to a key interaction with the flavin as the side chain of this group is located close to the N-1/C-2 carbonyl region of the flavin isoalloxazine ring, stabilizing the negative charge developed during enzyme reduction.

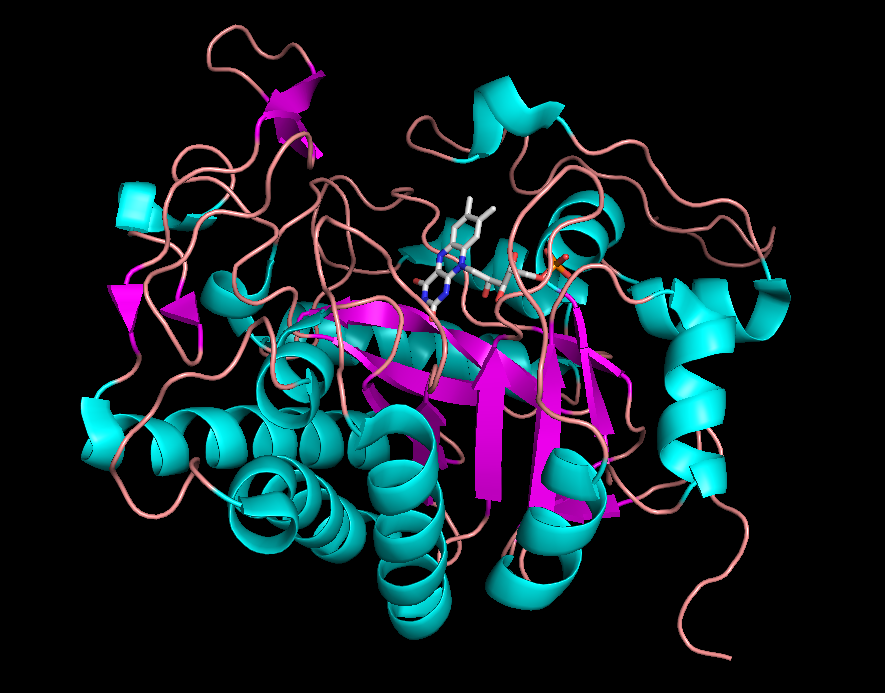
3D structure of a morphinone reductase single subunit. The non-covalently bound FMN prosthetic group is shown in sticks. PDB ID: 1GWJ. Figure generated by PyMOL.

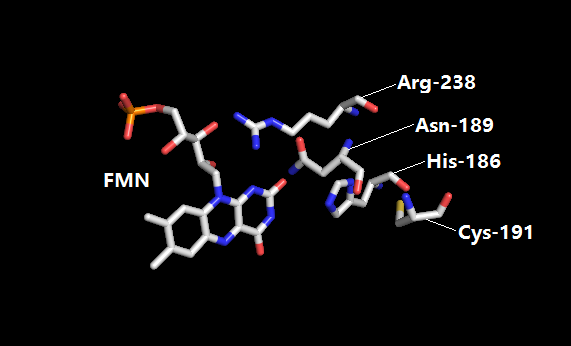
FMN prosthetic group and key residues at the active site of morphinone reductase.

== Enzyme catalysis ==
Morphinone reductase takes two substrates, namely morphinone and codeinone, and converts them to hydromorphone and hydrocodone respectively. The catalysis is part of the degradation pathway of morphine and codeine in Pseudomonas putida M10: morphine dehydrogenase and morphinone reductase together form a two-step catalysis converting morphine to hydromorphone, and codeine to hydrocondone.

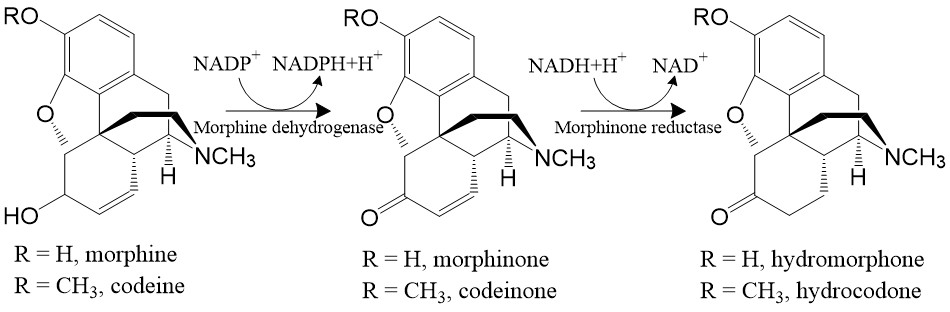
Initial steps of the morphine degradation pathway in Pseudomonas putida M10.

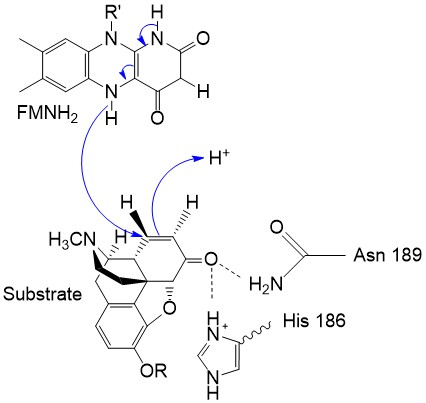
A proposed reduction mechanism catalyzed by morphinone reductase.

The prosthetic group FMN serves as a cofactor in the redox reaction catalyzed by morphinone reductase. In the reduction of morphinone to hydromorphone, FMNH_{2} is oxidized to FMN which is then reduced by NADH (and H^{+}) to regenerate FMNH_{2}. Previous studies showed that NADPH could not be used as a reducing agent, which suggested the enzyme's specific toward NADH as a substrate. Studies have shown that the mechanism of flavin reduction in morphinone reductase involve the rapid formation of an E-NADH^{CT} charge-transfer intermediate prior to FMN reduction. It was suggested that the enzyme adapts a two-step kinetic model where the oxidized enzyme (state A) undergoes an enzyme-coenzyme charge-transfer intermediate (state B) before regenerating the reduced form of FMN cofactor (state C). The reduction mechanism involves transfer of a hydride ion from the N5 atom of FMN to 2-cyclohexenone. The other proton donor for the saturation reaction remained uncertain.

Steady-state kinetics experiments suggested that morphinone reductase may follow a hybrid two-site, ping-pong kinetic mechanism in which the alkaloid substrates, i.e. morphinone and codeinone, bind independently at separate sites and sequential redox reaction is facilitated by reducing equivalents passed between the binding sites by means of redox-active prosthetic groups, i.e. FMN.

== Potential regulatory mechanism ==
The enzyme was shown to be highly similar to an oestrogen-binding protein from the fungus species Candida albicans, in which the binding of oestrogen prevents the reduction of 2-cyclohexenone. In addition, previous experimental characterization results suggested that morphinone reductase activity is competitively inhibited by progesterone and cortisone, which indicates that the regulatory mechanism of morphinone reductase could be related to its structural resemblance to the oestrogen-binding protein.

== Industrial relevance ==
The enzyme yields hydromorphone and hydrocodone, which are both valuable semi-synthetic opiate drugs. Hydromorphone is a powerful analgesic, which is shown to be more potent than morphine. Hydrocodone is a FDA-approved, mild analgesic and antitussive.

Notably, morphine and codeine are natural products of the opiate biosynthetic pathway in opium poppy plant Papaver somniferum. Modern technologies in genetic engineering and metabolic engineering enabled the production of these natural products in microorganisms. Complete biosynthesis of opiate compounds has been achieved in genetically tractable organisms Saccharomyces cerevisiae and Escherichia coli. Morphinone reductase was also successfully expressed in these two organisms. The enzyme represents a promising candidate for downstream modifications of opiate compounds, allowing the biosynthesis of valuable semi-synthetic opiate drugs in microorganisms. As an example, morphinone reductase was used as part of the de novo biosynthetic pathway of hydrocodone in yeast.
