= Dihydrocodeine =

Semi-synthetic opioid

Clinical data
- Trade names: Dicodin, others
- Other names: 6α-Hydrocodol
- AHFS/Drugs.com: International Drug Names
- Dependence liability: High
- Addiction liability: High
- Routes of administration: Oral; subcutaneous; intramuscular; rectal; sublingual; buccal
- ATC code: N02AA08 (WHO)

Legal status
- Legal status: AU: S3 (Pharmacist only) (S3) (S4) (S8) depending on dose and other constituents; BR: Class A2 (Narcotic drugs); CA: Schedule I; DE: Prescription only (Anlage III for higher doses); NZ: Class C2; UK: Class B; US: Schedule II (Schedule III in drug combination)

Pharmacokinetic data
- Bioavailability: By mouth: 21% (range 12–34%)
- Metabolism: Mainly hepatic, through CYP3A4 and CYP2D6
- Metabolites: • Dihydromorphine • Nordihydrocodeine • Others (e.g., conjugates)
- Elimination half-life: 4 hours

Identifiers
- IUPAC name: 4,5α-epoxy-3-methoxy-17-methylmorphinan-6α-ol
- CAS Number: 125-28-0
- PubChem CID: 5284543
- IUPHAR/BPS: 7594
- DrugBank: DB01551
- ChemSpider: 4447600
- UNII: N9I9HDB855
- KEGG: D07831
- ChEMBL: ChEMBL1595
- CompTox Dashboard (EPA): DTXSID5022936
- ECHA InfoCard: 100.004.303

Chemical and physical data
- Formula: C_{18}H_{23}NO_{3}
- Molar mass: 301.386 g·mol^{−1}
- 3D model (JSmol): Interactive image
- SMILES: O[C@@H]1[C@@H]2OC3=C(OC)C=CC4=C3[C@@]2([C@H]5CC1)CCN(C)[C@@H]5C4
- InChI: InChI=1S/C18H23NO3/c1-19-8-7-18-11-4-5-13(20)17(18)22-16-14(21-2)6-3-10(15(16)18)9-12(11)19/h3,6,11-13,17,20H,4-5,7-9H2,1-2H3/t11-,12+,13-,17-,18-/m0/s1; Key:RBOXVHNMENFORY-DNJOTXNNSA-N

Dihydrocodeine, sold under the brand name Dicodin among others, is a semi-synthetic opioid analgesic prescribed for pain or severe dyspnea, or as an antitussive, either alone or compounded with paracetamol (acetaminophen) (as in co-dydramol) or aspirin. It was developed in Germany in 1908 and first marketed in 1911.

Commonly available as tablets, solutions, elixirs, and other oral forms, dihydrocodeine is also available in some countries as an injectable solution for deep subcutaneous and intra-muscular administration. As with codeine, intravenous administration should be avoided, as it could result in anaphylaxis and life-threatening pulmonary edema. In the past, dihydrocodeine suppositories were used. Dihydrocodeine is available in suppository form on prescription. Dihydrocodeine is used as an alternative to codeine and similarly belongs to step 2 of the WHO analgesic ladder.

It was first described in 1911 and approved for medical use in 1948. Dihydrocodeine was developed during the search for more effective cough medication, especially to help reduce the spread of tuberculosis, pertussis, and pneumonia in the years from c.a. 1895 to 1915. It is similar in chemical structure to codeine.

== Medical uses ==
Approved indication for dihydrocodeine is the management of moderate to moderately severe pain as well as coughing and shortness of breath. As is the case with other drugs in this group, the antitussive dose tends to be less than the analgesic dose, and dihydrocodeine is a powerful cough suppressant like all other members of the immediate codeine family (see below) and their cousins hydrocodone, oxycodone and ethylmorphine, whole opium preparations, and the strong opioid hydromorphone.

For use against pain, dihydrocodeine is usually formulated as tablets or capsules containing 15–16 mg or 30–32 mg with or without other active ingredients such as aspirin, paracetamol (acetaminophen), ibuprofen, or others.

Controlled release dihydrocodeine is available for both pain and coughing, as indicated below, as waxy tablets containing 60 to 120 mg of the drug. Some formulations, intended for use against coughing and the like, have other active ingredients such as antihistamines, decongestants and others. Other oral formulations, such as packets of effervescent powder, sublingual drops, elixirs and the like are also available in many locations.

Injectable dihydrocodeine is most often given as a deep subcutaneous injection. Dihydrocodeine appears to be superior to tramadol in treating pain.

== Side effects ==
As with other opioids, tolerance and physical and psychological dependence develop with repeated dihydrocodeine use. All opioids can impair the mental or physical abilities required for the performance of potentially hazardous tasks such as driving or operating machinery if taken in large doses.

Itching and flushing and other effects of blood vessel dilation are also common side-effects, due to histamine release in response to the drug using one or more types of receptors in the CNS or other responses elsewhere in the body. First-generation antihistamines such as tripelennamine (Pyrabenzamine), clemastine (Tavist), hydroxyzine (Atarax), diphenhydramine (Benadryl), cyproheptadine (Periactin), brompheniramine (Dimetapp), chlorphenamine (Chlor-Trimeton), doxylamine (NyQuil) and phenyltoloxamine (Percogesic Original Formula) not only combat the histamine-driven side-effects, but are analgesic-sparing (potentiating) in various degrees. The antihistamine promethazine (Phenergan) may also have a positive effect on hepatic metabolism of dihydrocodeine as it does with codeine. Higher doses of promethazine may interfere with most other opioids with the exception of the pethidine family (Demerol and the like) by this or other unknown mechanisms.

As with all drugs, side-effects depend on the person taking the medication. They can range in severity from mild to extreme, from headaches to difficulty breathing.

Constipation is the one side-effect of dihydrocodeine and almost all opioids which is near-universal. It results from the slowing of peristalsis in the gut and is a reason dihydrocodeine, ethylmorphine, codeine, opium preparations, and morphine are used to stop diarrhoea and combat irritable bowel syndrome (IBS) in its diarrhoeal and cyclical forms as well as other conditions causing hypermotility or intestinal cramping. Opium/opioid preparations are used often as a last resort where pain is severe and the bowels are organically loose. It is generally better to treat IBS with a non psycho-tropic opioid such as loperamide hydrochloride which stays contained in the bowel, thereby not causing drowsy effects and allowing many people to work using machines etc. For IBS, hyoscine butylbromide (Buscopan in the UK) and mebeverine hydrochloride (Colofac) can be effective with or without an opium related compound.

== Pharmacology ==
Dihydrocodeine exerts its analgesic action through affinity to predominantly μ-opioid receptor and to lesser extent to κ-opioid receptor and δ-opioid receptor. A 1956 source states that 30 mg of subcutaneous dihydrocodeine is equianalgesic to 10 mg of morphine. Another source states that dihydrocodeine is twice as strong as codeine and the metabolite dihydromorphine is likewise twice as strong as morphine.

Dihydrocodeine (DHC) is O-demethylated into dihydromorphine (DHM) by CYP2D6 and N-demethylated into nordihydrocodeine (NDHC) by CYP3A4, summarily yielding nordihydromorphine (NDHM). Dihydrocodeine and its metabolites form 3- and 6-glucuronides. Due to the multidirectional metabolism, as opposed to tramadol and codeine, CYP2D6 activity probably does not influence DHC analgesia. The analgesia is likely achieved by the action of DHC itself, as well as DHC-6-G. DHC appears not to differ between poor and extensive metabolizers in terms of its pain threshold and pupillary reaction effect in spite of major variation in DHM blood levels.

DHC-6-G is half as potent as DHC. DHM and DHM-6-G display the highest affinity to μ-opioid receptors, being 70 times as potent as DHC, whereas other metabolites display lesser affinity. DHM-6-G has similar potency as DHM, while DHM-3-G is considerably weaker. Action on δ-opioid receptor is 5-50 weaker compared to μ with the exception of DHC-6-G being twice as strong as DHC. 6-glucuronides possess lesser affinity towards κ-opioid receptors, albeit the affinity of DHC is comparable to codeine, DHM and morphine.

The primary compounds responsible for analgesia are DHC and DHC-6-G. Although some of the metabolites are far more potent, the concentration of NDHM and NDHM-6-G in urine were minimal, suggesting no significant role in pain relief.

After oral absorption, the drug is absorbed relatively rapidly with mean peak concentration at 1.7 hours. The mean half-life is 4 hours. The mean bioavailability of orally administered drug is 21%. Metabolite concentrations are high in relation to the parent drug, suggesting extensive first-pass metabolism. Dihydrocodeine tablets may possess an extended-release mechanism, lowering peak concentrations and increasing duration of action.

== Regulation ==
Australia
In Australia, dihydrocodeine is a 'pharmacist only' Schedule 3 drug, only when indicated for cough suppression, and compounded with one or more other therapeutically active substances not exceeding 15 mg dihydrocodeine per dose. Schedule 3 drugs, while still OTC, can only be dispensed after consultation with a pharmacist. It is a Schedule 4 (prescription only) drug when compounded with one or more other therapeutically active substances and not exceeding 100 mg dihydrocodeine per dose. Any Dihydrocodeine preparation not falling within Schedules 3 or 4, including single ingredient dihydrocodeine preparations, are categorised as Schedule 8 (controlled drugs), which can only be dispensed in accordance with the stricter requirements of the state or territory in which they are prescribed (and which vary between states and territories).

Hong Kong
In Hong Kong, dihydrocodeine is regulated under Schedule 1 of Hong Kong's Chapter 134 Dangerous Drugs Ordinance. It can only be used legally by health professionals and for university research purposes. A pharmacist can dispense Dihydrocodeine when furnished with a doctors prescription. Anyone who supplies the substance without a prescription can be fined $10000 (HKD). The penalty for trafficking or manufacturing the substance is a $5,000,000 (HKD) fine and life imprisonment. Possession of the substance for consumption, without a licence from the Department of Health, is illegal and carries a $1,000,000 (HKD) fine or 7 years imprisonment.

Japan
In Japan, dihydrocodeine is available without a prescription; used in cough medicines such as New Bron Solution-ACE. Dihydrocodeine is used as an antitussive in many products as a Dextromethorphan alternative. Medicines in Japan which contain dihydrocodeine are coupled with caffeine to offset the sedative effects and discourage recreational use. Cough medicines containing dihydrocodeine are controlled similarly to dextromethorphan in the United States, in that its sale is strictly limited by purchase quantity and is restricted to persons 20 and older for purchase.

United Kingdom
In the United Kingdom, dihydrocodeine is a Class B drug; but, it is available over-the-counter in small amounts (less than 8 mg), when combined with paracetamol (see co-dydramol). Dihydrocodeine is listed in Schedule 5 of the Misuse of Drugs Regulations 2001 whereby it is exempt from prohibition on possession provided that it is in the form of a single preparation not being designed for injection and less than 100 mg (calculated as free base) or with a total concentration less than 2.5% (calculated as free base). Illegal possession of dihydrocodeine can result in up to 5 years in prison or an unlimited fine.

United States
In the US, pure dihydrocodeine is a DEA Schedule II substance, although preparations containing small amounts of dihydrocodeine can also be classified as Schedule III or Schedule V, depending on the concentration of dihydrocodeine relative to other active constituents, such as paracetamol (acetaminophen). The DEA's ACSCN for dihydrocodeine free base and all salts is 9120. The 2013 annual aggregate manufacturing quota is 250 kilos.

International treaties and the controlled-substances laws of most countries, such as the German Betäubungsmittelgesetz, regulate dihydrocodeine at the same level as codeine. Dihydrocodeine-based pharmaceuticals are especially used where chronic pain patients are able to have essentially OTC access to them provided they are registered with the provincial or national government as such a patient.

Controlled-release dihydrocodeine is a non-prescription item in some places, especially the 60 mg strength. A report by the Ivo Šandor Organisation in 2004 listed Andorra, Spain, Gibraltar and Austria as having varying degrees of access to these and other dihydrocodeine, nicocodeine and codeine products.

== Chemistry ==
It is available as the following salts, in approximate descending order of frequency of use: bitartrate, phosphate, hydrochloride, tartrate, hydroiodide, methyliodide, hydrobromide, sulfate, and thiocyanate. The salt to free base conversion factors are 0.67 for the bitartrate, 0.73 for the phosphate, and 0.89 for the hydrochloride.

Dihydrocodeine is the parent drug of a series of moderately strong narcotics including, among others, hydrocodone, nicocodeine, nicodicodeine, thebaine and acetyldihydrocodeine. It is an original member and chemical base of a number of similar semi-synthetic opioids such as acetyldihydrocodeine, dihydrocodeinone enol acetate, dihydroisocodeine, nicocodeine, and nicodicodeine.

Whereas converting codeine to morphine is a difficult and unrewarding task, dihydrocodeine can be converted to dihydromorphine with very high yields (over 95%). Dihydromorphine is widely used in Japan. The dihydromorphine can be quantitatively converted to hydromorphone using potassium tert butoxide.

Dihydrocodeine can be presumptively detected by the Froehde reagent.

== Recreational use ==
As dihydrocodeine can provide a euphoric high when taken in higher-than-therapeutic doses, it is quite commonly used recreationally. The typical recreational dose can be anything from 70 mg to 500 mg, or, in users with tolerance, even more. Potentiators and adjuvants are often included when dihydrocodeine is used in an unsupervised fashion, especially carisoprodol, glutethimide, hydroxyzine and first-generation antihistamines, both to intensify the effect and lessen side-effects such as itching.

== History ==
Two famous users of dihydrocodeine were William S. Burroughs, who described it as "twice as strong as codeine and almost as good as heroin" and Hermann Göring, who was a known morphine addict (Hitler referred to him as the "morphinist"), consumed up to 100 tablets (3 grams) of dihydrocodeine per day and was captured by the Allies with a large quantity of the drug in a suitcase, reportedly more than 20,000 tablets. Another account suggest Hermann Göring was taking 20 tablets in the morning and 20 at night to ward off morphine withdrawals. Germany was experiencing a massive shortage of morphine, and as a result Göring used massive amounts of dihydrocodeine. He also used morphine and oxycodone, beginning with therapeutic use of morphine after being wounded in the groin during the November 1923 Beer Hall Putsch in Munich and then used dihydrocodeine in the early 1930s for toothache.

== Society and culture ==
=== Brand names ===
Brand names for dihydrocodeine products include Drocode, Paracodeine, Parzone, Rikodeine, Trezix, Synalgos DC, Panlor DC, Panlor SS, Contugesic, New Bron Solution-ACE, Huscode, Drocode, Paracodin, Paramol (UK), Codidol, Dehace, DHC Continus, Didor Continus, Dicogesic, Codhydrine, Dekacodin, DH-Codeine, Didrate, Dihydrin, Hydrocodin, Nadeine, Novicodin, Rapacodin, Fortuss, Remedeine, Dico, Synalgos-DC (US), and DF-118.

=== Preparations and availability ===
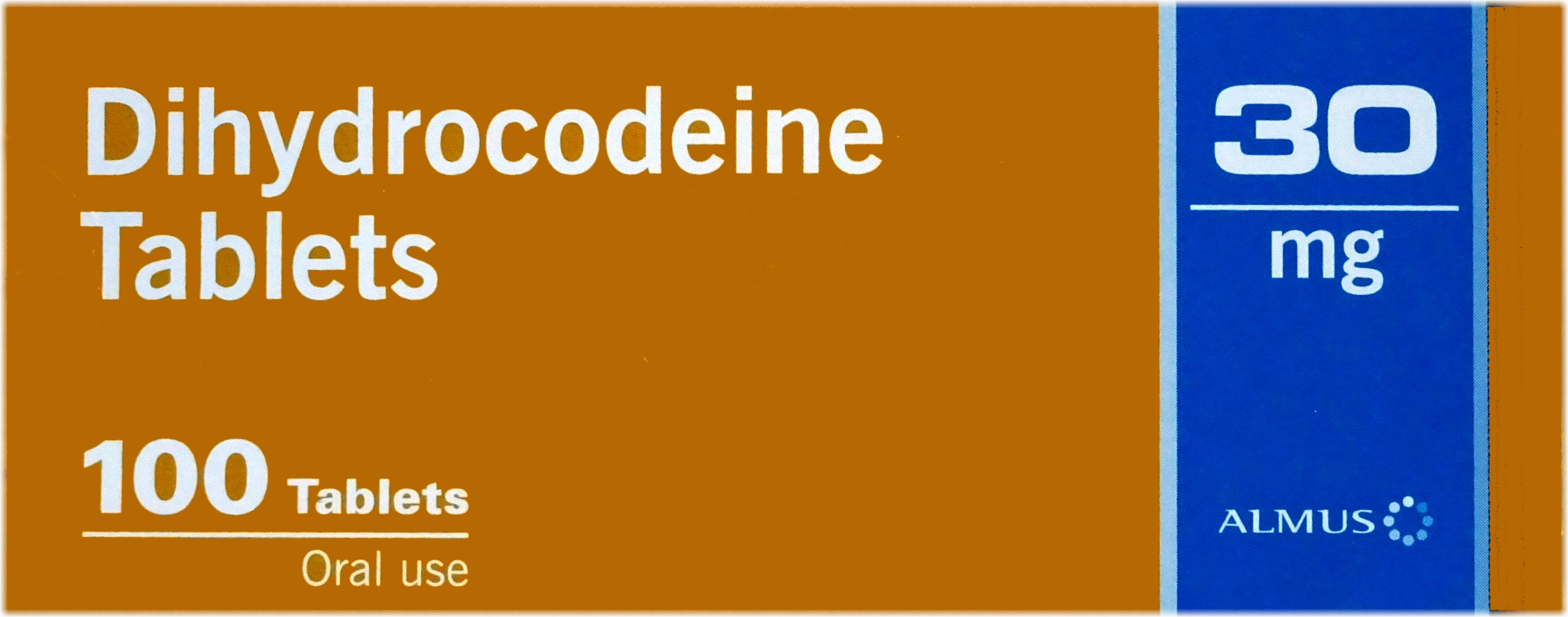
Package of 100 dihydrocodeine tablets

Dihydrocodeine products which can be purchased over the counter in many European and Pacific Rim countries generally contain from 2 to 20 mg of dihydrocodeine per dosing unit combined with one or more other active ingredients such as paracetamol (acetaminophen), aspirin, ibuprofen, antihistamines, decongestants, vitamins, medicinal herb preparations, and other such ingredients. In a subset of these countries and foreign possessions, 30 mg tablets and 60 mg controlled-release tablets are available over the counter and chemists may very well be able to dispense the 90 and 120 mg strengths at their discretion.

In the United States, the most common analgesic brands with dihydrocodeine are: DHC Plus (16 and 32 mg), Panlor SS (32 mg), ZerLor (32 mg), Panlor DC (16 mg) and Synalgos DC (16 mg). These combination products also include paracetamol (acetaminophen) and caffeine. Aspirin is used in the case of Synalgos DC.

Dihydrocodeine is sometimes marketed in combination preparations with paracetamol as co-dydramol (BAN) to provide greater pain relief than either agent used singly (see Synergy § Drug synergy).

In the UK and other countries, 30 mg tablets containing only dihydrocodeine as the active ingredient are available, also a 40 mg Dihydrocodeine tablet is available in the UK as DF-118 Forte.

The original dihydrocodeine product, Paracodin, is an elixir of dihydrocodeine hydroiodide also available as a Tussionex-style suspension in many European countries.

In many European countries and elsewhere in the world, the most commonly found dihydrocodeine preparations are extended-release tablets made by encasing granules of the ingredient mixture, almost always using the bitartrate salt of dihydrocodeine, of four different sizes in a wax-based binder. The usual strengths are 60, 90, and 120 mg. Common trade names for the extended-release tablets are Didor Continus, Codidol, Codi-Contin, Dicodin (made in France and the major product containing the tartrate salt), Contugesic, DHC, and DHC Continus.

Dihydrocodeine is available in Japan as tablets which contain 2.5 mg of dihydrocodeine phosphate and caffeine, the decongestant d,l-methylephedrine HCl, and the antihistamine chlorpheniramine, and packets of granules which effervesce like Alka-Seltzer with 10 mg of dihydrocodeine with lysozyme and chlorpheniramine, marketed for OTC sale as New Bron Solution-ACE. These two formulations may have once contained phenyltoloxamine citrate as the antihistamine component.

Elsewhere in the Pacific Rim, Dicogesic in analogous to Glaxo/Smith-Kline's DF-118.

The manufacturer of New Bron Solution-ACE; SS Pharmaceutical Co., Ltd, also markets an ibuprofen with dihydrocodeine product called S.Tac EVE, which also includes d,l-methylephedrine HCl, chlorpheniramine, anhydrous caffeine, and vitamins B1 and C.

The Panlor series is manufactured by Pan-American Laboratories of Covington, Louisiana, and they also market several dihydrocodeine-based prescription cough syrups in the United States.
