= Dihydromorphine =

Semi-synthetic opioid analgesic drug

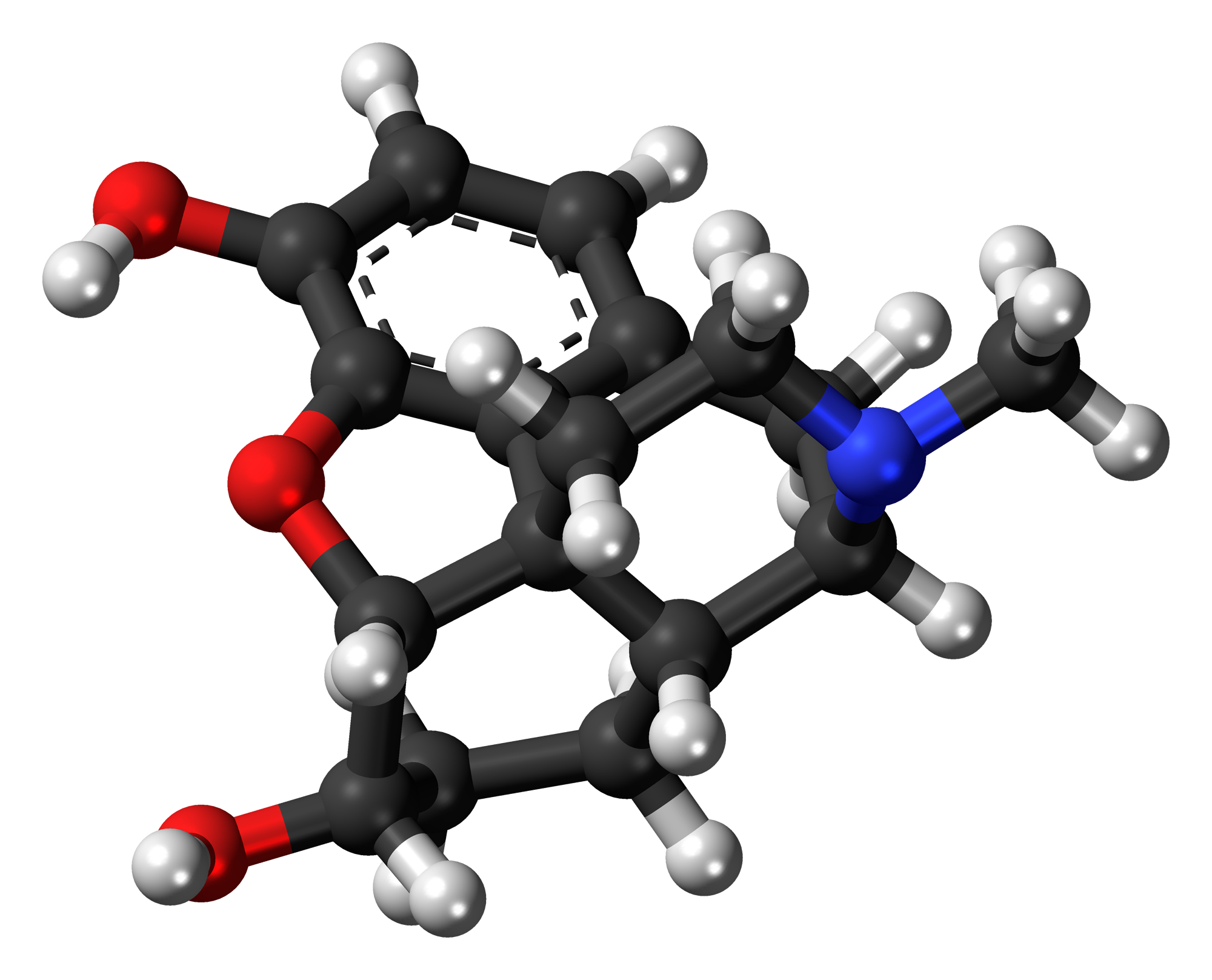

Clinical data
- Other names: Dihydromorphine, Paramorphan
- Dependence liability: High
- Addiction liability: High
- Routes of administration: Oral, Intravenous, Intranasally, Sublingually
- ATC code: none

Legal status
- Legal status: AU: S8 (Controlled drug); BR: Class A1 (Narcotic drugs); CA: Schedule I; DE: Anlage II (Authorized trade only, not prescriptible); US: Schedule I

Identifiers
- IUPAC name: 3,6-dihydroxy-(5α,6α)-4,5-epoxy-17-methylmorphinan
- CAS Number: 509-60-4
- PubChem CID: 5359421
- IUPHAR/BPS: 1616
- DrugBank: DB01565
- ChemSpider: 4514282
- UNII: C3S5FRP6JW
- KEGG: C11782
- ChEMBL: ChEMBL1500
- CompTox Dashboard (EPA): DTXSID7048908
- ECHA InfoCard: 100.007.365

Chemical and physical data
- Formula: C_{17}H_{21}NO_{3}
- Molar mass: 287.359 g·mol^{−1}
- 3D model (JSmol): Interactive image
- SMILES: O[C@@H]4[C@@H]5Oc1c2c(ccc1O)C[C@H]3N(CC[C@]25[C@H]3CC4)C
- InChI: InChI=1S/C17H21NO3/c1-18-7-6-17-10-3-5-13(20)16(17)21-15-12(19)4-2-9(14(15)17)8-11(10)18/h2,4,10-11,13,16,19-20H,3,5-8H2,1H3/t10-,11+,13-,16-,17-/m0/s1; Key:IJVCSMSMFSCRME-KBQPJGBKSA-N

Dihydromorphine (Paramorfan, Paramorphan) is a semi-synthetic opioid structurally related to and derived from morphine. The 7,8-double bond in morphine is reduced to a single bond to get dihydromorphine. Dihydromorphine is a moderately strong analgesic and is used clinically in the treatment of pain and also is an active metabolite of the analgesic opioid drug dihydrocodeine. Dihydromorphine occurs in trace quantities in assays of opium on occasion, as does dihydrocodeine, dihydrothebaine, tetrahydrothebaine, etc. The process for manufacturing dihydromorphine from morphine for pharmaceutical use was developed in Germany in the late 19th century, with the synthesis being published in 1900 and the drug introduced clinically as Paramorfan shortly thereafter. A high-yield synthesis from tetrahydrothebaine was later developed.

== Uses ==
=== Medical ===
Dihydromorphine is used for the management of moderate to severe pain such as that occurring in cancer; however, it is less effective in treating neuropathic pain and is generally considered inappropriate and ineffective for psychological pain.

=== Research ===
Dihydromorphine, often labelled with the isotope tritium in the form of [3H]-dihydromorphine, is used in scientific research to study binding of the opioid receptors in the nervous system.

== Strength ==
Dihydromorphine is slightly stronger than morphine as an analgesic with a similar side effect profile. The relative potency of dihydromorphine is about 1.2 times that of morphine. In comparison, the relative potency of dihydrocodeine is around 1.2 to 1.75 times that of codeine.

== Pharmacology ==
Dihydromorphine acts as an agonist at the μ-opioid with a K_{i} value of 2.5 nM compared to 4.9 nM of morphine, δ-opioid with a K_{i} value of 137 nM compared to 273 nM of morphine and κ-opioid with a K_{i} value of 223 nM compared to 227 nM of morphine. Dihydromorphine is therefore slightly more μ-selective than morphine. Agonism of the μ-opioid and δ-opioid receptors is largely responsible for the clinical effects of opioids like dihydromorphine, with the μ-agonism providing more analgesia than the δ.

=== Pharmacokinetics ===
Dihydromorphine's onset of action is more rapid than morphine and it also tends to have a longer duration of action, generally 4–7 hours.

== Legality ==
Under the 1961 international Single Convention on Narcotic Drugs treaty dihydromorphine is a Schedule I narcotic subject to control, and other countries' laws may vary.

=== United States ===
Under the Controlled Substances Act, dihydromorphine is listed as a Schedule I substance along with heroin. In the United States, its role in the production of dihydrocodeine and other related drugs make it a Schedule I substance with one of the higher annual manufacturing quotas granted by the US Drug Enforcement Administration: 3300 kilograms in 2013. Manufacturers, distributors, and importers with the correct DEA license and state permits related thereto are able to use Schedule I drugs in this fashion when they are transformed into something of a lower schedule. The DEA has assigned dihydromorphine and all of its salts, esters, etc. the ACSCN of 9145. As with nicomorphine, MDMA and heroin, dihydromorphine is also used in research in properly licensed facilities. US DEA Form 225, the most common and least expensive individual researcher's license, does not include Schedule I drugs, and so the lab must have a higher-level DEA registration. As with other licit opioids used for medical purposes in other countries, including even much weaker opioids like nicocodeine, benzylmorphine, and tilidine, the reason for dihydromorphine being in Schedule I is that it was not in medical use in the US at time the Controlled Substances Act of 1970 was drawn up.

=== Europe ===
Dihydromorphine is regulated in the same fashion as morphine in Germany under the BtMG, Austrian SMG, and Swiss BtMG, where it is still used as an analgesic. The drug was invented in Germany in 1900 and marketed shortly thereafter. It is often used in Patient Controlled Analgesia units.

=== Japan ===
Dihydromorphine and morphine are also used alongside each other in clinical use in Japan and is regulated as such

== See also ==
- Dihydroheroin
- Acetyldihydrocodeine
- Morphine
- Nicodicodeine
- Nicocodeine
- Thebacon
