= Opiate =

Substance derived from opium

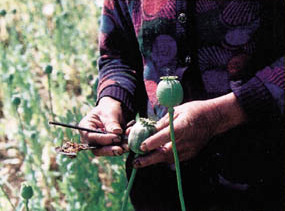
Harvesting the poppy pod.

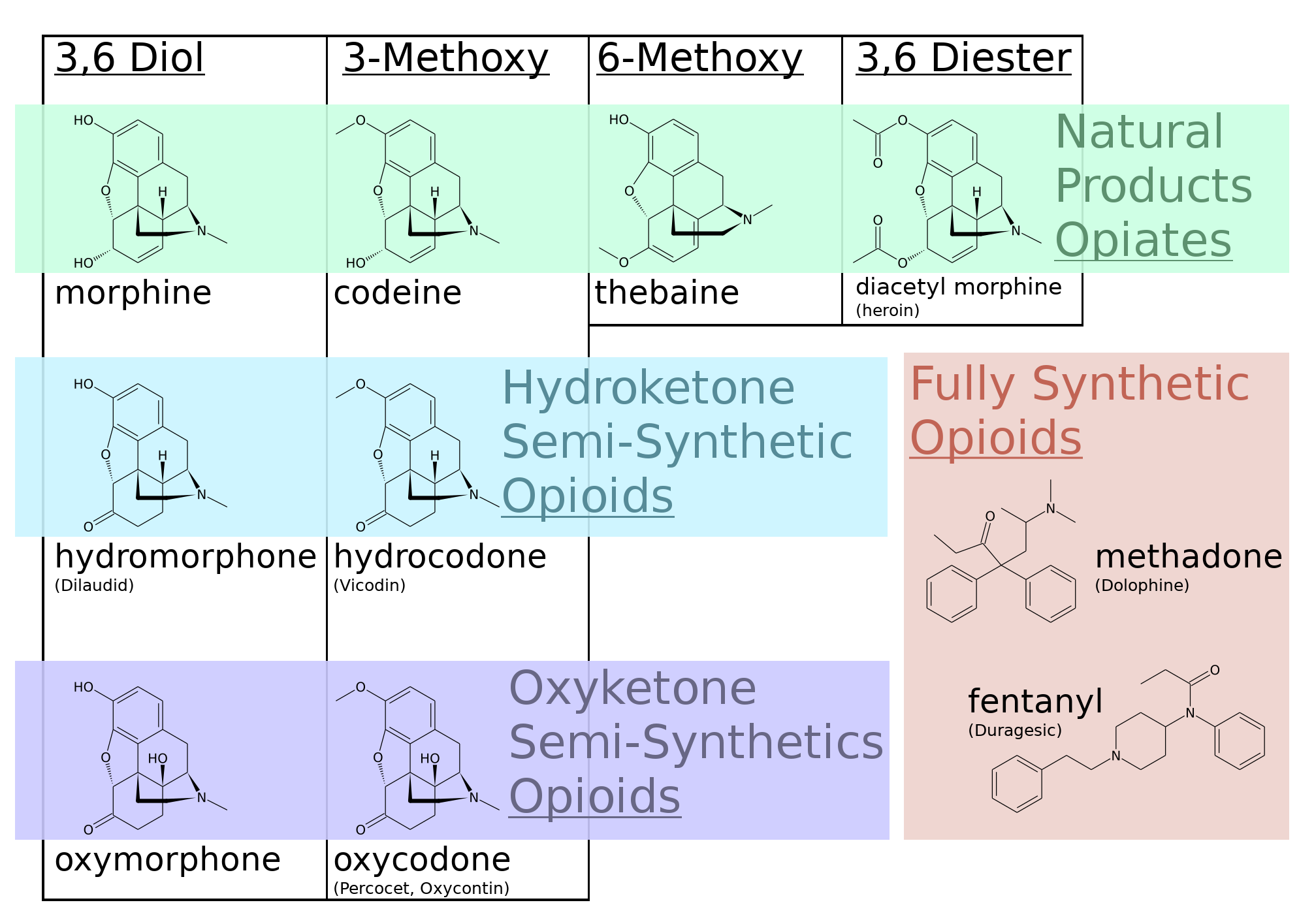
A chart outlining the structural features that define opiates and opioids, including distinctions between semi-synthetic and fully synthetic opioid structures

An opiate is an alkaloid substance derived from opium (or poppy straw). It differs from the similar term opioid in that the latter is used to designate all substances, both natural and synthetic, that bind to opioid receptors in the brain (including antagonists). Opiates are alkaloid compounds naturally found in the opium poppy plant Papaver somniferum. The psychoactive compounds found in the opium plant include morphine, codeine, and thebaine. Opiates have long been used for a variety of medical conditions, with evidence of opiate trade and use for pain relief as early as the eighth century AD. Most opiates are considered drugs with moderate to high abuse potential and are listed on various "Substance-Control Schedules" under the Uniform Controlled Substances Act of the United States of America.

In 2014, between 13 and 20 million people used opioids recreationally, representing 0.3% to 0.4% of the global population between the ages of 15 and 65. According to the CDC, from this population, there were 47,000 deaths, with a total of 500,000 deaths from 2000 to 2014. In 2016, the World Health Organization reported that 27 million people suffer from opioid use disorder. They also reported that in 2015, 450,000 people died as a result of drug use, with between a third and a half of that number being attributed to opioids.

== Overview ==
Codeine

Chemical structure of morphine

Opiates belong to the large biosynthetic group of benzylisoquinoline alkaloids, and are so named because they are naturally occurring alkaloids found in the opium poppy. The major psychoactive opiates are morphine, codeine, and thebaine. Papaverine, noscapine, and approximately 24 other alkaloids are also present in opium but have little to no effect on the human central nervous system. Alkaloids that have no effect on the central nervous system were not always considered to be opiates, but current trend is to refer to all alkaloids derived from opium or poppy straw as such.

Very small quantities of hydrocodone and hydromorphone are detected in assays of opium on rare occasions. It appears to be produced by the plant under circumstances and by processes that are not understood at this time. Dihydrocodeine, oxymorphol, oxycodone, oxymorphone, metopon Possibly other derivatives of morphine and/or hydromorphone also are found in trace amounts in opium.

Despite morphine being the most medically significant opioid, larger quantities of codeine are consumed medically, most of it synthesized from morphine. Codeine has greater and more predictable oral bioavailability. Codeine is not reliably metabolised into its active form, morphine, by CYP2D6 due to the considerable amount of polymorphism. Many individuals lack any appreciable metabolism to morphine and experience no therapeutic effects, although may still have nausea/vomiting or constipation.

A significant population are rapid, or ultra-rapid metabolizers and can quickly develop fatal toxicity from even the small amount present in breast milk or from a few doses. It is widely thought that Codeine has less abuse potential than morphine, in spite of widely being abused. Its abuse potential is largely limited by its adverse effect profile. Use of codeine in many countries is decreasing because of the wide range of metabolism, frequent adverse effects at therapeutic (30 to 60mg doses) doses, and in most people its analgesic efficacy is comparable to a therapeutic dose of acetaminophen.

Morphine addiction cure advertisement in the year 1900

Opiate withdrawal syndrome effects are associated with the abrupt cessation or reduction of prolonged opiate usage.

The manifestation of opiate dependence and abuse relies on a variety of factors, including the opiate's pharmacokinetic properties and the user's predisposition for addiction.

== Synthesis ==
While the full synthesis of opioids from naphthoquinone (Gates synthesis) or other simple organic starting materials is possible, they are tedious and uneconomical processes. Therefore, most of the opiate-type analgesics in use today are either extracted from Papaver somniferum or synthesized from those opiates, especially thebaine.

== Pharmacokinetics ==
=== Codeine ===
Codeine is a prodrug which is converted to morphine and acts on μ-opiate receptors. It is converted to morphine by metabolism of CYP2D6 enzymes. Individuals who have lower CYP2D6 activity may not metabolize codeine at all, and will not experience its analgesic effects. Conversely, individuals with rapid or ultra-rapid CYP2D6 activity may metabolize the drug too quickly and experience dose-related side effects such as sedation and fatal respiratory depression.

=== Fentanyl ===
Fentanyl is a synthetic piperidine opioid structurally similar to arylpiperidines. It is a strong μ-receptor agonist that is 80–100 times more potent than morphine, and has a fast onset with a shorter duration of action than morphine due to redistribution from CNS location to fatty tissue. When it is used as a continual drug (e.g. transdermal patches, longer term use of IV fentanyl in ICU patients) its elimination half-life and duration of effect are longer than morphine. It is metabolized in the liver by CYP3A4 enzymes to the compound norfentanyl.

=== Heroin ===
Global estimates of drug users in 2016 (in millions of users)
Substance	Best estimate	Low estimate	High estimate
Amphetamine- type stimulants	34.16	13.42	55.24
Cannabis	192.15	165.76	234.06
Cocaine	18.20	13.87	22.85
Ecstasy	20.57	8.99	32.34
Opiates	19.38	13.80	26.15
Opioids	34.26	27.01	44.54

Heroin, the common name for diacetylmorphine, is the first of several semi-synthetic opioids to be derived from morphine, a component of natural opium. It is formed by the acetylation of morphine in order to increase the lipid solubility. Heroin (diacetylmorphine) is a morphine prodrug; it is metabolized by the liver into morphine after administration. One of the major metabolites of heroin, 6-monoacetylmorphine (6-MAM), is also a morphine prodrug.

=== Hydromorphone ===
Hydromorphone is derived from morphine and may be used as an alternative to it. It has a high first-pass metabolism when given orally, and is primarily glucuronidated in the liver to hydromorphone-3-glucoronide (H3G). 75% of hydromorphone is renally excreted, with 7% excreted as the parent opiate.

=== Meperidine ===
Meperidine is a synthetic opiate, part of the arylpiperidine class. It is a strong μ-receptor agonist with 1/10th the potency of morphine. It has historically also been used to treat rigors, and has a half-life of three to four hours. It is hepatically metabolized to the active metabolites of normeperidine, normepiridinic acid, and medperidinic acid. Normeperidine may accumulate to toxic levels in patients with renal impairment with repeated doses, and can cause CNS excitation and seizures.

=== Methadone ===
Methadone has a higher bioavailability and half-life compared to morphine. It is metabolized to an inactive product by N-demethylation by CYP3A4 enzymes in the liver. It has high person-to-person variability because of varying levels of CYP3A4 in individuals. It is approved for treatment of moderate to severe pain as well as opioid dependence. Because of its high risk of drug interactions, liver toxicity, and patient variability, patients have to be monitored closely at methadone clinics. In addition, there is an increase risk of mortality in patients who are treated with methadone compared to other opioids, thought to be due to QTc prolongation and cardiac arrhythmias.

=== Morphine ===
Nicomorphine (Vilan, morphine dinicotinate), Diamorphine (Heroin, morphine diacetate), dipropanoylmorphine (morphine dipropionate), desomorphine (Permonid, di-hydro-desoxy-morphine), methyldesorphine, acetylpropionylmorphine, dibenzoylmorphine, diacetyldihydromorphine, and several others are also derived from morphine.

Morphine is metabolized in the liver to morphine-3-glucuronide (M3G) and morphine-6-glucuronide (M6G), and are excreted by the kidneys. It is also able to cross into the blood-brain barrier into the cerebrospinal fluid. M6G has potent analgesic activity, binds to opioid receptors, and is a main contributor to the therapeutic benefit of morphine. M3G does not act as an analgesic, has a low affinity for opioid receptors, and may possibly antagonize the therapeutic effects of morphine and M6G. Moreover, high doses of morphine, and thus M3G, are associated with neurotoxic side effects such as hyperalgesia, allodynia and myoclonus.

=== Oxymorphone ===
Oxymorphone is a congener of morphine. It is metabolized to 6-hydroxy-oxymorphone and oxymorphone-3-glucuronide, and 40% is excreted as metabolites. 6-hydroxy-oxymorphine is active and exists in a 1:1 ratio with the parent drug. Oxymorphone-3-glucuronide's activity is unknown.

== Indication ==
Opiates with opioid activity are mainly used for pain management with the premise that there will be benefits for both pain & function that will outweigh the risks to the patient. Another indication is symptomatic relief of shortage of breath, both in the acute setting (for example, pulmonary edema) and in terminally ill patients.

In spite of scarce, often conflicting, evidence, at times studies showing no benefit at all, opioids such as codeine, hydrocodone, and hydromorphone have been traditionally used for treatment of acute viral cough (aka "acute bronchitis"), cough due to COPD exacerbation, chronic post-viral cough, chronic idiopathic cough, and cough from other causes. Given the abuse potential, the frequent GI side effects, and several studies showing no discernable benefit, recommendations are against use of opioids for cough in children.

In spite of widespread use, the science supporting use of opioids for cough in adults is most notable for the small sample size, poor study design, and inconclusive results which suggest that there may be a small reduction in the amount of coughing when it is precisely measured. Actual evidence of patient-oriented outcomes, e.g. do the patients feel any better than when given a placebo, is elusive. The use of codeine as the "gold-standard" for which other drugs can be compared has been called into question, as showing that a drug is as good as, or at least not worse than, a drug with no benefit and only noxious side effects and a potential for abuse leaves much to be desired.

Opioid dose conversions may be necessary when switching medications given the differing pharmacodynamics between opioids. Generally, parenteral (IV or IM) morphine is used as the standard for converting between opiates to achieve equivalent analgesic effects. These differences in morphine-equivalents may differ between formulations of the same medication, and certainly between oral and injection. Calculating total daily dose using morphine milligram equivalents is used to identify patients at risk of overdose.

== Complications and side effects ==
Common side effects associated with opioid use include: sedation, nausea, dizziness, vomiting, constipation, physical dependence, tolerance, and potentially fatal respiratory depression. Of these the most common are constipation & nausea. There is no development of tolerance to constipation. This is why stool softeners or laxatives (polyethylene glycol, docusate, and senna) are often prescribed with opioids.

While overdose, whether intentional, accidental, or due to rapid 2D6 conversion of codeine (or tramadol, a non-opiate opioid that, like codeine, has little intrinsic effect on μ-receptors, but rather acts as pro-drug with an active metabolite that is a μ-agonist.

Less common side effects include: delayed gastric emptying, hyperalgesia, immunologic and hormonal dysfunction (hypogonadism is often seen in men taking chronic opioids, but is not always clinically evident), muscle rigidity, and myoclonus.

Opiate use for pain is widely accepted in the healthcare system. Long-term treatment for chronic pain is controversial as there is a high risk of addiction associated with its use leading to abuse and diversion to others even when taken properly. Those addicted to opiates will prioritize acquiring these drugs over other activities in their lives, negatively impacting their professional and personal relationships. Moreover, there are not many well-designed studies evaluating the overall safety and efficacy. Many small studies using small doses, often half the recommended dose, have not shown much effect, but these cannot be relied upon to give much information on the more common practice of step-wise therapy and slow dose escalation.

Chronic opioid use predictably leads to tolerance, and may do so fairly quickly, in days to weeks. This occurs even with what are considered modest doses, e.g. ≥25mg oxycodone a day. This may result in the patient to need higher and/or more frequent doses of the drug to get euphoric effects, although it may not be a factor in analgesic effects as tolerance to a dose of opioid does not seem related to loss of efficacy. Tolerance is associated with upregulation of μ-receptors, and possibly others.

Concentration-dependence adverse effects may vary based on the user's genetic polymorphisms which can alter drug metabolism. Cytochrome P450, notably CYP2D6, but also CYP3A4, is responsible for the metabolism of various opiates to active metabolites and variations in CYP450 activity lead to varying serum drug levels.

== Pharmacology in pain ==
Pain is an unpleasant sensory and emotional experience associated with actual or potential tissue damage. It is an essential defensive function where pain works as an alarm to avoid or limit tissue damage. Its neurobiology is complex, and involves stimulation of several different types of nerves. Opioids act upon opioid receptors that are coupled to inhibitor G protein coupled receptors (GPCR). These receptors fall into 3 classes: μ (mu), δ (delta), and κ (kappa) receptors.

More than 70% of opioid receptors are μ receptors, predominantly located on the central terminals of nociceptors in the dorsal horn of the spinal cord. The remaining 30% of opioid receptors are located post-synaptically on dendrites of second-order spinothalamic neurons & interneurons.

When an opiate binds as an agonist to the GPCR, there will be a signaling cascade resulting in the inhibition of adenylate cyclase and calcium ion channels with the stimulation of potassium ion channels. The net effect of these changes is a reduced intracellular cAMP and hyperpolarization of the neuronal cell reducing neurotransmitter release. Through this pathway, when opiates bind to and activate the mu receptor, there is a decrease transmission of pain signalling.

This pathway targeted for the analgesia properties that opiates are known and used for. Other clinically important roles of mu are its involvement in respiratory and cardiovascular functions, gastrointestinal peristalsis, feeding, and mood. These other pathways are important because they explain the side effects of opiate use like respiratory depression at high doses, constipation with chronic use, and addicting properties.

== Absolute contraindications ==
Those with the following conditions should not be using opioids:

- Severe respiratory instability
- Acute psychiatric instability
- Uncontrolled suicide risk
- Diagnosed non-nicotine substance abuse
- QTc intervals longer than 500 milliseconds if prescribed methadone
- Acute diversion of controlled substances
- Intolerance from previous trial use with specific opioids
- Serious adverse effects or lack of efficacy

== Risk factors for prescription abuse ==
The following are risk factors for opiate prescription abuse:

- Past or current history of substance abuse
- Undiagnosed psychiatric disorders, yet to be identified and treated
- A young age
- Family history of substance abuse
- Social environments that encourage substance use
- Prolonged use or treatment with opioids

Statistically, middle-aged patients with substance use history and psychiatric comorbidities are seen with higher mortality risks such as suicide.

Iatrogenic physiological and psychological drug dependence can occur to one of any background. Some physicians are more liberal with their prescribing of opiates and their patients become dependent on opiates by simply following their doctor's orders.

== See also ==
- Opiate comparison
- Opioid epidemic
