= Benzhydrocodone =

Chemical compound

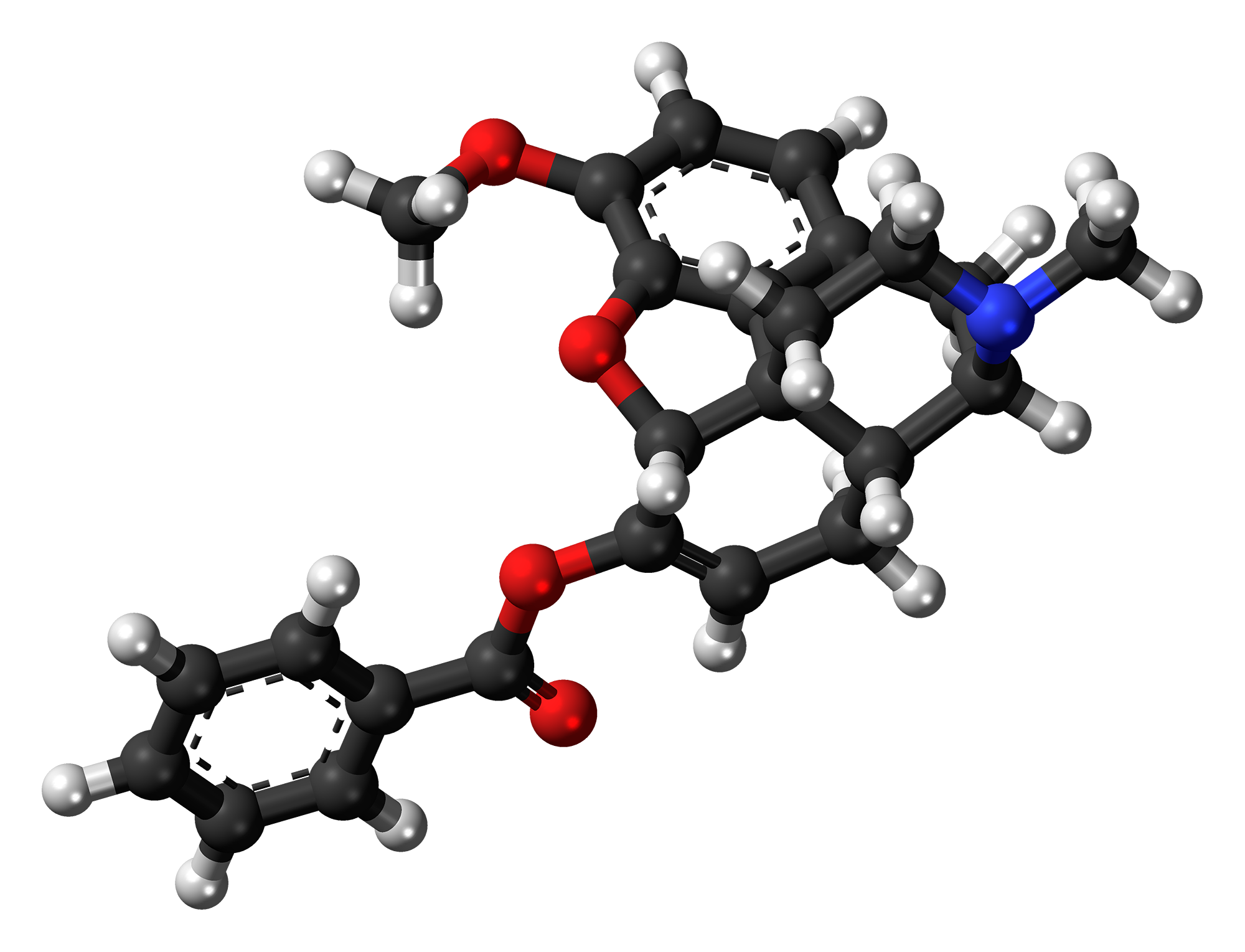

Clinical data
- Other names: KP201
- Routes of administration: Oral

Identifiers
- IUPAC name: 6,7-didehydro-4,5α-epoxy-3-methoxy-17-methylmorphinan-6-yl benzoate
- CAS Number: 1259440-61-3
- PubChem CID: 49836084
- DrugBank: DB15465
- ChemSpider: 31484780
- UNII: 75MS0AAZ9I
- KEGG: D10612
- ChEMBL: ChEMBL3137321
- CompTox Dashboard (EPA): DTXSID201027932

Chemical and physical data
- Formula: C_{25}H_{25}NO_{4}
- Molar mass: 403.478 g·mol^{−1}
- 3D model (JSmol): Interactive image
- SMILES: CN1CC[C@]23c4c5ccc(c4O[C@H]2C(=CC[C@H]3[C@H]1C5)OC(=O)c6ccccc6)OC
- InChI: InChI=1S/C25H25NO4/c1-26-13-12-25-17-9-11-20(29-24(27)15-6-4-3-5-7-15)23(25)30-22-19(28-2)10-8-16(21(22)25)14-18(17)26/h3-8,10-11,17-18,23H,9,12-14H2,1-2H3/t17-,18+,23-,25-/m0/s1; Key:VPMRSLWWUXNYRY-PJCFOSJUSA-N

Benzhydrocodone (INN; contracted from benzoate-hydrocodone) is an opioid prodrug of the morphinan class. Its chemical structure consists of hydrocodone coupled with benzoic acid. Benzhydrocodone itself is inactive and acts as a prodrug to hydrocodone upon cleavage of the benzoate portion of the molecule.

It is designed to be an opioid analgesic with a low chance of recreational use.

Created by Kempharm, Inc., a biopharmaceutical company in Coralville, Iowa, President and CEO, Travis Mickle, believes the molecular-based approach to abuse deterrent may be more effective than many formulation-based approaches.

When approved, Apadaz received a labeling that highlighted all relevant aspects of the drug, including the lower abuse profile compared to traditional hydrocodone-acetaminophen. The labeling showed several items supporting a lower abuse profile than traditional hydrocodone-acetaminophen; namely, a lower Drug Liking in the first two hours after intranasal abuse (snorting), and the conversion of benzhydrocodone to hydrocodone in vitro being a "difficult process" — with benzhydrocodone being a more difficult drug to abuse according to FDA advisory committee documents.

== FDA approval ==
The Food and Drug Administration approved benzhydrocodone and acetaminophen (Apadaz) for the short-term (no more than 14 days) management of acute pain severe enough to require an opioid analgesic and where alternative treatments are inadequate.

== Clinical pharmacology ==
Benzhydrocodone is a prodrug of hydrocodone. Hydrocodone is a full agonist of the opioid receptors with a higher affinity for the mu-opioid receptor. Upon binding, hydrocodone produces an analgesic effect with no ceiling. The exact mechanism of analgesia is unknown. Acetaminophen is a non-opioid, non-salicylate analgesic. The specific mechanism of analgesia has not been determined.

== Effects ==
Hydrocodone causes respiratory depression and miosis. Hydrocodone decreases gastrointestinal (GI) motility by increasing smooth muscle tone and decreasing propulsive contractions, which may result in constipation.

Hydrocodone causes dilation of peripheral blood vessels, which can cause hypotension and syncope. Vasodilation coupled with histamine release can result in pruritus, sweating and flushing.

Hydrocodone, like other opioids, stimulates the secretion of prolactin, growth hormone (GH), insulin and glucagon. Conversely, hydrocodone inhibits adrenocorticotropic hormone (ACTH), cortisol and luteinizing hormone (LH) secretion. Chronic hydrocodone use can lead to androgen deficiency, which may result in low libido, impotence, erectile dysfunction, amenorrhea or infertility.

Hydrocodone use can suppress the immune system.

== Pharmacokinetics ==
Bioequivalence studies have shown that benzhydrocodone/APAP is bioequivalent to other immediate-release hydrocodone combination products such as 7.5 mg hydrocodone/200 mg ibuprofen (Vicoprofen) and 7.5 mg hydrocodone/325 mg acetaminophen (Norco).

Benzhydrocodone is metabolized to hydrocodone by intestinal enzymes. Hydrocodone can undergo O-demethylation via CYP2D6, N-demethylation via CYP3A4 and 6-keto reduction. O-demethylation of hydrocodone produces hydromorphone, a potent opioid. Acetaminophen is metabolized in the liver via glucuronide conjugation, sulfate conjugation or oxidation. The CYP450 dependent (CYP1A2, CYP2E1, and CYP3A4) oxidation pathway produces a reactive metabolite that conjugates with glutathione. The glutathione conjugate is then metabolized to cysteine and mercapturic acid conjugates.

Hydrocodone is mainly excreted in the urine. The average half-life of hydrocodone is 4.5 hours. Acetaminophen metabolites are also eliminated in the urine. The average half-life of acetaminophen is 2 to 3 hours in adults.

== Boxed warnings ==
Benzhydrocodone/APAP has the potential for addiction as well as abuse and misuse, which can result in overdose and death. Serious, life-threatening, or fatal respiratory depression can occur. Accidental ingestion can cause a fatal overdose of hydrocodone. Hydrocodone can cause neonatal opioid withdrawal syndrome when taken during pregnancy. Benzhydrocodone/APAP contains acetaminophen, which can cause acute liver failure at high doses (>4000 mg a day in healthy adults). Benzhydrocodone/APAP use with CYP3A4 inhibitors can cause a fatal overdose of hydrocodone. Benzhydrocodone/APAP use with benzodiazepines or other CNS depressants can cause sedation, respiratory depression, coma or death. Benzhydrocodone is a schedule II-controlled substance. Like other opioids, benzhydrocodone has the potential to be abused. Chronic benzhydrocodone use can lead to the development of tolerance and physical dependence. Withdrawal symptoms can occur from abrupt discontinuation or rapid tapering of benzhydrocodone.

== Adverse events ==
The safety of benzhydrocodone/APAP was evaluated in a total of 200 healthy adults in six phase 1 studies. The subjects received at least one oral dose of benzhydrocodone/APAP. The most common adverse events in these studies were nausea (21.5%), somnolence (18.5%), vomiting (13.0%), constipation (12.0%), pruritus (11.5%), dizziness (7.5%) and headache (6.0%).

Benzhydrocodone/APAP use with serotonergic drugs can cause serotonin syndrome. Mixed agonist/antagonist and partial agonist opioids may reduce the analgesic effect of benzhydrocodone/APAP or cause withdrawal symptoms. MAOIs can increase the effects of benzhydrocodone/APAP.

== Contraindications ==
Benzhydrocodone/APAP is contraindicated in patients with significant respiratory depression, bronchial asthma in an unmonitored setting, known or suspected gastrointestinal obstructions (including paralytic ileus). It is also contraindicated in patients that have experienced hypersensitivity to hydrocodone, acetaminophen or any other component in the formulation.

== Use in specific populations ==
Hydrocodone can cause neonatal opioid withdrawal syndrome when taken during pregnancy. Reproductive and developmental studies of acetaminophen in rats and mice have shown fetotoxicity, necrosis of the liver and kidney in the pregnant rat and the fetus, retarded growth and decreased reproductive capacity of the offspring. Hydrocodone and acetaminophen are present in breast milk. Chronic opioid use can cause infertility. Safety and efficacy has not been established in patients under the age of 18. Patients over the age of 65 may have heightened sensitivity to hydrocodone. Benzhydrocodone/APAP is mainly excreted through the kidneys; therefore, geriatric patients with impaired renal function may experience more adverse reactions. The effect of renal impairment on the pharmacokinetics of benzhydrocodone/APAP has not been determined. The effect of hepatic impairment on the pharmacokinetics of benzhydrocodone/APAP has not been determined.

== Dosage and administration ==
Each benzhydrocodone/APAP immediate release tablet contains 6.12 mg of benzhydrocodone (equivalent to 6.67 mg of benzhydrocodone hydrochloride) and 325 mg of acetaminophen. The tablets are white, capsule-shaped and are debossed with "KP201" on one side. Dosing should start at one to two tablets every four to six hours, as needed for pain. The dosage should not exceed 12 tablets in a 24-hour period. The total dosage of benzhydrocodone/APAP and any other acetaminophen containing products should not exceed 4000 mg of acetaminophen in a 24-hour period.

== See also ==
- Myrophine
- Thebacon
