= 3-Acetyloxymorphone =

Names
- IUPAC name 14-Hydroxy-17-methyl-6-oxo-4,5α-epoxymorphinan-3-yl acetate
- Systematic IUPAC name (4R,4aS,7aR,12bS)-4a-Hydroxy-3-methyl-7-oxo-2,3,4,4a,5,6,7,7a-octahydro-1H-4,12-methano[1]benzofuro[3,2-e]isoquinolin-9-yl acetate
- Other names Oxymorphone acetate

Identifiers
CAS Number	75660-23-0
3D model (JSmol)	Interactive image
ChemSpider	9036119
PubChem CID	10860829
UNII	X3XDF6MCD6
CompTox Dashboard (EPA)	DTXSID801045312
- InChI: InChI=1S/C19H21NO5/c1-10(21)24-13-4-3-11-9-14-19(23)6-5-12(22)17-18(19,7-8-20(14)2)15(11)16(13)25-17/h3-4,14,17,23H,5-9H2,1-2H3/t14-,17+,18+,19-/m1/s1 Key: DMGAPZQHWZFIRE-GRGSLBFTSA-N
- SMILES: CN1[C@H](C2)[C@@]3(O)[C@@]4(CC1)C5=C2C=CC(OC(C)=O)=C5O[C@@]4([H])C(CC3)=O

Properties
Chemical formula	C_{19}H_{21}NO_{5}
Molar mass	343.379 g·mol^{−1}
- Except where otherwise noted, data are given for materials in their standard state (at 25 °C [77 °F], 100 kPa). Infobox references

3-Acetyloxymorphone is an opioid analgesic which has never been marketed. It is an acetyl derivative of oxymorphone and is an intermediate in the synthesis of several related drugs.
