= Nicodicodine =

Opioid antitussive and analgesic drug

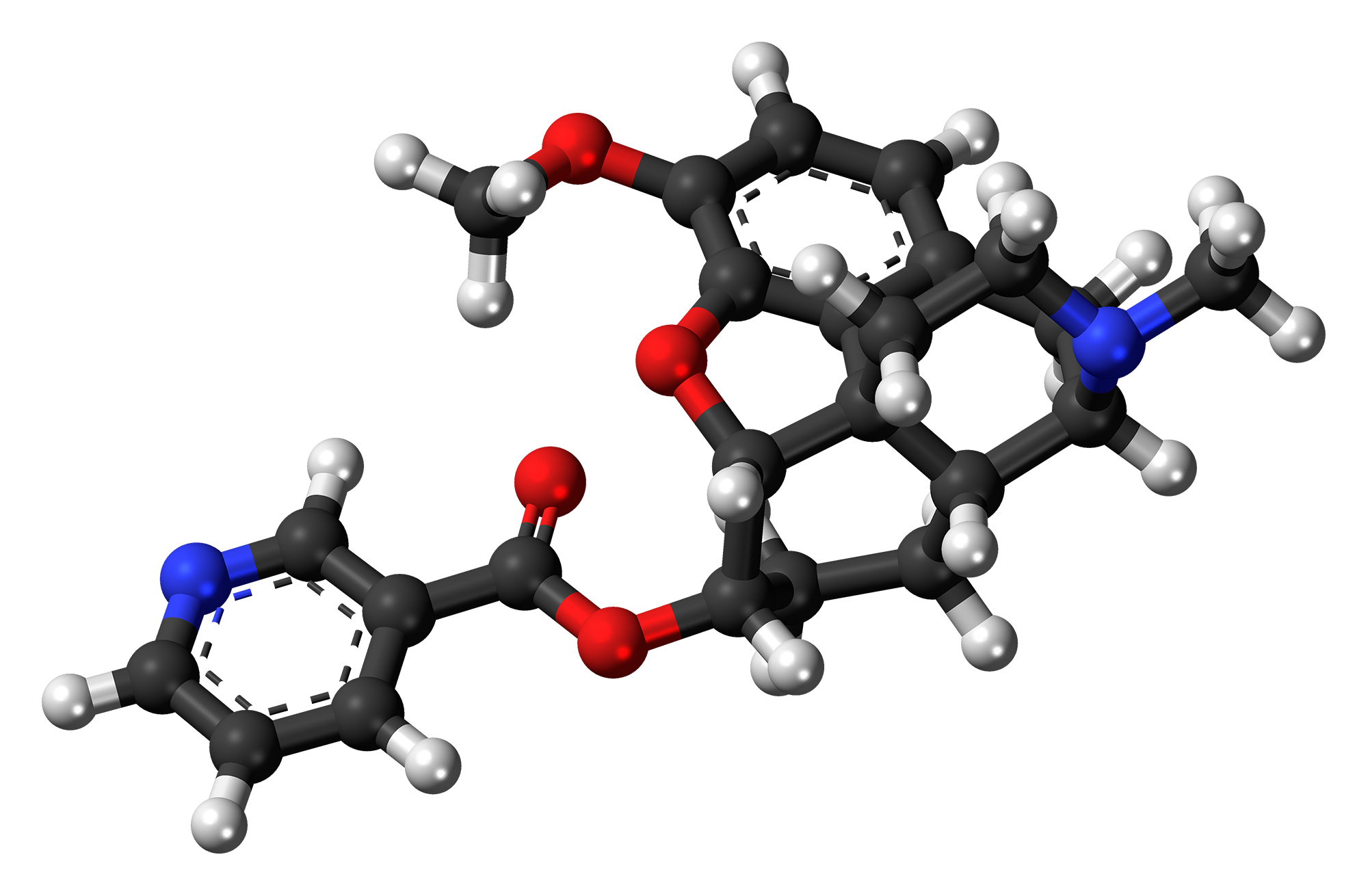

Clinical data
- Other names: Nicodicodeine, 6-Nicotinoyldihydrocodeine, Nicodicodina, Nicodicodinum
- Routes of administration: Oral, intravenous
- ATC code: none

Legal status
- Legal status: AU: S2 (Pharmacy medicine); BR: Class A2 (Narcotic drugs); DE: Anlage II (Authorized trade only, not prescriptible); UK: Class B; UN: Narcotic Schedules I and III

Identifiers
- IUPAC name: (5alpha,6alpha)-3-Methoxy-17-methyl-4,5-epoxymorphinan-6-yl pyridine-3-carboxylate
- CAS Number: 808-24-2
- PubChem CID: 5464304
- ChemSpider: 4576612
- UNII: 04G0T06UGT
- CompTox Dashboard (EPA): DTXSID40230642
- ECHA InfoCard: 100.011.241

Chemical and physical data
- Formula: C_{24}H_{26}N_{2}O_{4}
- Molar mass: 406.482 g·mol^{−1}
- 3D model (JSmol): Interactive image
- SMILES: CN1CCC23C4C1CC5=C2C(=C(C=C5)OC)OC3C(CC4)OC(=O)C6=CN=CC=C6
- InChI: InChI=InChI=1S/C24H26N2O4/c1-26-11-9-24-16-6-8-19(29-23(27)15-4-3-10-25-13-15)22(24)30-21-18(28-2)7-5-14(20(21)24)12-17(16)26/h3-5,7,10,13,16-17,19,22H,6,8-9,11-12H2,1-2H3/t16-,17+,19-,22-,24-/m0/s1; Key:GTGRMWCOZHEYRL-MJFIPZRTSA-N

Nicodicodine is an opioid developed as a cough suppressant and analgesic. Synthesized in 1904, it is not commonly used, but has activity similar to other opioids. Nicodicodine is metabolised in the liver by demethylation to produce 6-nicotinoyldihydromorphine, and subsequently further metabolised to dihydromorphine. Since the final active metabolite is the slightly stronger opiate dihydromorphine rather than morphine, nicodicodine can be expected to be marginally more potent and longer acting than nicocodeine. Side effects are similar to those of other opioids and include itching, nausea and respiratory depression.
