= Hydromorphone =

Opioid medication used for pain relief

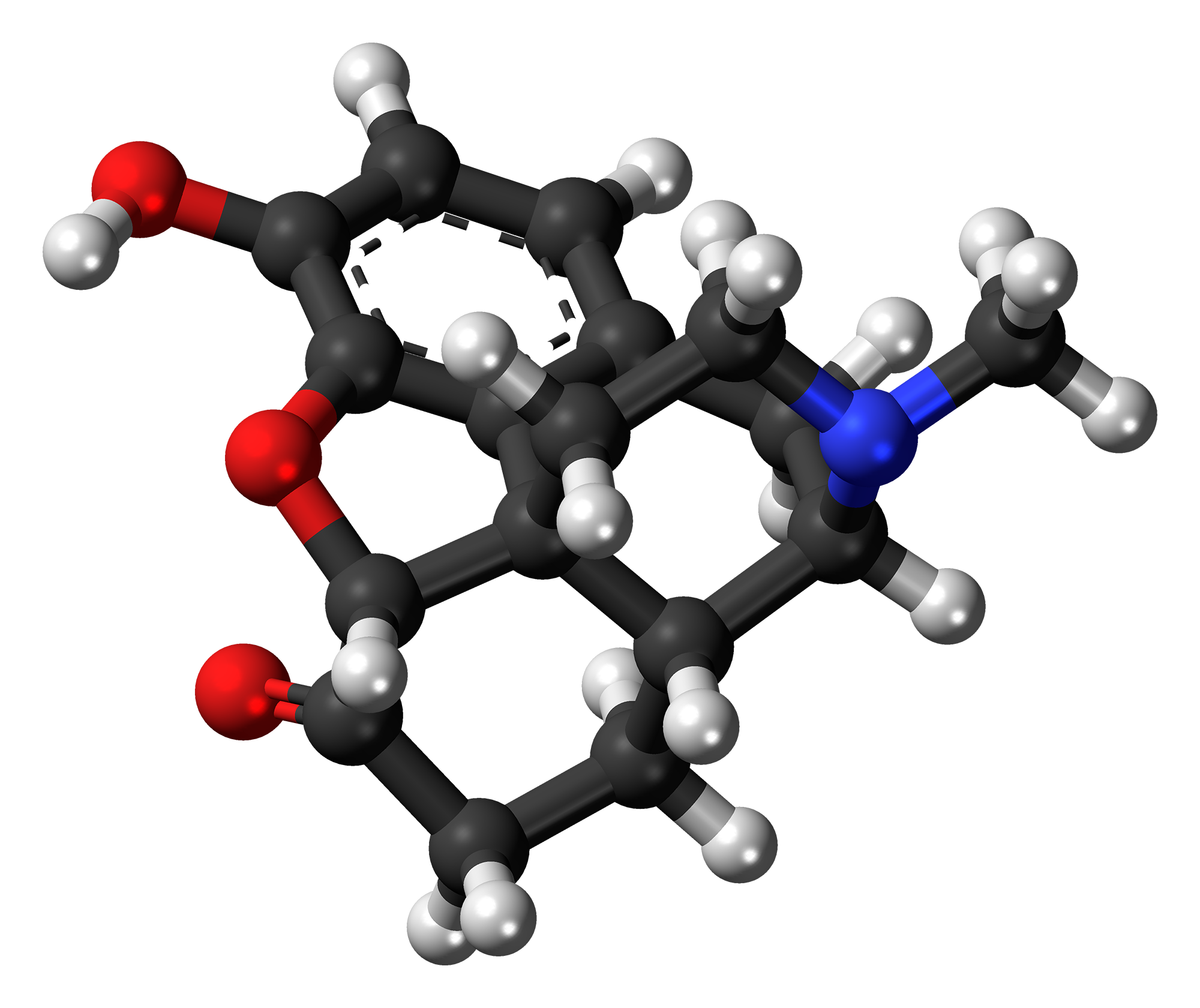

Clinical data
- Trade names: Dilaudid, others
- Other names: Dihydromorphinone
- AHFS/Drugs.com: Monograph
- MedlinePlus: a682013
- License data: US DailyMed: Hydromorphone
- Pregnancy category: AU: C
- Dependence liability: High
- Addiction liability: High
- Routes of administration: By mouth, intramuscular, intravenous, subcutaneous
- Drug class: Opioid
- ATC code: N02AA03 (WHO)

Legal status
- Legal status: AU: S8 (Controlled drug); BR: Class A1 (Narcotic drugs); CA: Schedule I; DE: Anlage III (Special prescription form required); NZ: Class B; UK: Class A Controlled Drug: Schedule II; US: Schedule II; UN: Narcotic Schedule I; SE: Förteckning II

Pharmacokinetic data
- Bioavailability: By mouth: 25–50%, Intranasal: 52–58%, IV/IM: 100%
- Protein binding: 20%
- Metabolism: Liver
- Onset of action: 15–30 min
- Elimination half-life: 2–3 hours
- Duration of action: 4–5 hours
- Excretion: Kidney

Identifiers
- IUPAC name: 4,5-α-Epoxy-3-hydroxy-17-methyl morphinan-6-one
- CAS Number: 466-99-9
- PubChem CID: 5284570
- IUPHAR/BPS: 7082
- DrugBank: DB00327
- ChemSpider: 4447624
- UNII: Q812464R06
- KEGG: D08047
- ChEBI: CHEBI:5790
- ChEMBL: ChEMBL398707
- CompTox Dashboard (EPA): DTXSID8023133
- ECHA InfoCard: 100.006.713

Chemical and physical data
- Formula: C_{17}H_{19}NO_{3}
- Molar mass: 285.343 g·mol^{−1}
- 3D model (JSmol): Interactive image
- Solubility in water: HCl salt: 333
- SMILES: O=C4[C@@H]5Oc1c2c(ccc1O)C[C@H]3N(CC[C@]25[C@H]3CC4)C
- InChI: InChI=1S/C17H19NO3/c1-18-7-6-17-10-3-5-13(20)16(17)21-15-12(19)4-2-9(14(15)17)8-11(10)18/h2,4,10-11,16,19H,3,5-8H2,1H3/t10-,11+,16-,17-/m0/s1; Key:WVLOADHCBXTIJK-YNHQPCIGSA-N

Hydromorphone, also known as dihydromorphinone, and sold under the brand name Dilaudid among others, is a morphinan opioid used to treat moderate to severe pain. Typically, long-term use is only recommended for pain due to cancer. It may be used by mouth or by injection into a vein, muscle, or under the skin. Effects generally begin within half an hour and last for up to five hours. A 2016 Cochrane review (updated in 2021) found little difference in benefit between hydromorphone and other opioids for cancer pain.

Common side effects include dizziness, euphoria, sleepiness, nausea, itchiness, and constipation. Serious side effects may include abuse, low blood pressure, seizures, respiratory depression, and serotonin syndrome. Rapidly decreasing the dose may result in opioid withdrawal. Generally, use during pregnancy or breastfeeding is not recommended. Hydromorphone exerts its effects by activating opioid receptors, mainly in the brain and spinal cord. Hydromorphone 2 mg IV is equivalent to approximately 10 mg morphine IV.

Hydromorphone is made from morphine and was patented in 1923. Hydromorphone is a therapeutic alternative on the World Health Organization's List of Essential Medicines. It is available as a generic medication. In 2022, it was the 233rd most commonly prescribed medication in the United States, with more than 1 million prescriptions.

== Side effects ==
Adverse effects of hydromorphone are similar to those of other potent opioid analgesics such as morphine and heroin. The major hazards of hydromorphone include dose-related respiratory depression, urinary retention, bronchospasm, and sometimes, circulatory depression. More common side effects include lightheadedness, dizziness, nystagmus, sedation, itching, constipation, nausea, vomiting, headache, perspiration, and hallucinations. These symptoms are common in ambulatory patients and in those not experiencing severe pain.

Simultaneous use of hydromorphone with other opioids, muscle relaxants, tranquilizers, sedatives, and general anesthetics may significantly depress respiration, progressing to coma or death. Taking benzodiazepines (e.g., diazepam) in conjunction with hydromorphone may increase side effects such as dizziness and difficulty concentrating. If simultaneous use of these drugs is required, dose adjustment may be made.

A particular problem that may occur with hydromorphone is accidental administration in place of morphine due to a mix-up between the similar names, either at the time the prescription is written or when the drug is dispensed. This has led to several deaths and calls for hydromorphone to be distributed in distinctly different packaging from morphine to avoid confusion.

Massive overdoses are rarely observed in opioid-tolerant individuals, but when they occur, they may lead to circulatory system collapse. Symptoms of overdose include respiratory depression, drowsiness leading to coma and sometimes to death, drooping of skeletal muscles, low heart rate, and decreasing blood pressure. At the hospital, individuals with hydromorphone overdose are provided supportive care, such as assisted ventilation to provide oxygen and gut decontamination using activated charcoal through a nasogastric tube. Opioid antagonists, such as naloxone, also may be administered concurrently with oxygen supplementation. Naloxone works by reversing the effects of hydromorphone, and is administered only in the presence of significant respiratory depression and circulatory depression.

Sugar cravings associated with hydromorphone use are the result of a glucose crash after transient hyperglycemia following injection, or a less profound lowering of blood sugar over a period of hours, in common with morphine, heroin, codeine, and other opioids.

=== Hormone imbalance ===
As with other opioids, hydromorphone (particularly during heavy chronic use) often causes temporary hypogonadism or hormone imbalance.

=== Neurotoxicity ===
In the setting of prolonged use, high dosage, and/or kidney dysfunction, hydromorphone has been associated with neuroexcitatory symptoms such as tremor, myoclonus, agitation, and cognitive dysfunction. This toxicity is less than that associated with other classes of opioids such as the pethidine class of synthetics in particular.

=== Withdrawal ===
Users of hydromorphone may experience painful symptoms if the drug is suspended. Some people cannot tolerate the symptoms, which results in continuous drug use. Symptoms of opioid withdrawal are not easy to decipher, as there are differences between drug-seeking behaviors and true withdrawal effects. Symptoms associated with hydromorphone withdrawal include:

- Abdominal pain
- Anxiety
- Panic attacks
- Depression
- Piloerection (goose bumps)
- Inability to enjoy daily activities
- Muscle and joint pain
- Nausea
- Vomiting
- Runny nose and excessive secretion of tears
- Sweating

In the clinical setting, excessive secretion of tears, yawning, and dilation of pupils are helpful presentations in diagnosing opioid withdrawal. Hydromorphone is a rapid-acting painkiller; however, some formulations may last up to several hours. Patients who stop taking this drug abruptly may experience withdrawal symptoms, which may start within hours of taking the last dose of hydromorphone, and last up to several weeks. Withdrawal symptoms in people who stopped taking the opioid may be managed by using opioids or non-opioid adjuncts. Methadone is an opioid commonly used for this kind of therapy. However, the selection of therapy should be tailored to each specific person. Methadone also is used for detoxification in people who have opiate addiction, such as heroin or drugs similar to morphine. It may be given orally or intramuscularly. There is controversy regarding whether any opioid (such as methadone) should be included in the treatment of opioid withdrawal symptoms, since these agents also may cause relapse when therapy is suspended. Clonidine is a non-opioid adjunct which may be used in situations where opioid use is not desired, such as in patients with high blood pressure.

== Interactions ==
CNS depressants may enhance the depressant effects of hydromorphone, such as other opioids, anesthetics, sedatives, hypnotics, barbiturates, benzodiazepines, phenothiazines, chloral hydrate, dimenhydrinate, and glutethimide. The depressant effect of hydromorphone also may be enhanced by monoamine oxidase inhibitors (MAO inhibitors), first-generation antihistamines (e.g., brompheniramine, promethazine, diphenhydramine, chlorphenamine), beta blockers, and alcohol. When combined therapy is contemplated, the dose of one or both agents should be reduced.

== Pharmacology ==
Hydromorphone at opioid receptors
Affinities (K_{i})			Ratio
MOR	DOR	KOR	MOR:DOR:KOR
0.47 nM	18.5 nM	24.9 nM	1:39:53

Equianalgesic doses
Compound	Route	Dose
Codeine	PO	200 mg
Hydrocodone	PO	20–30 mg
Hydromorphone	PO	7.5 mg
Hydromorphone	IV	1.5 mg
Morphine	PO	30 mg
Morphine	IV	10 mg
Oxycodone	PO	20 mg
Oxycodone	IV	10 mg
Oxymorphone	PO	10 mg
Oxymorphone	IV	1 mg

Hydromorphone is a semi-synthetic μ-opioid agonist. As a hydrogenated ketone of morphine, it shares the pharmacologic properties typical of opioid analgesics. Hydromorphone and related opioids produce their major effects on the central nervous system and gastrointestinal tract. These include analgesia, drowsiness, mental clouding, changes in mood, euphoria or dysphoria, respiratory depression, cough suppression, decreased gastrointestinal motility, nausea, vomiting, increased cerebrospinal fluid pressure, increased biliary pressure, and increased pinpoint constriction of the pupils.

=== Formulations ===
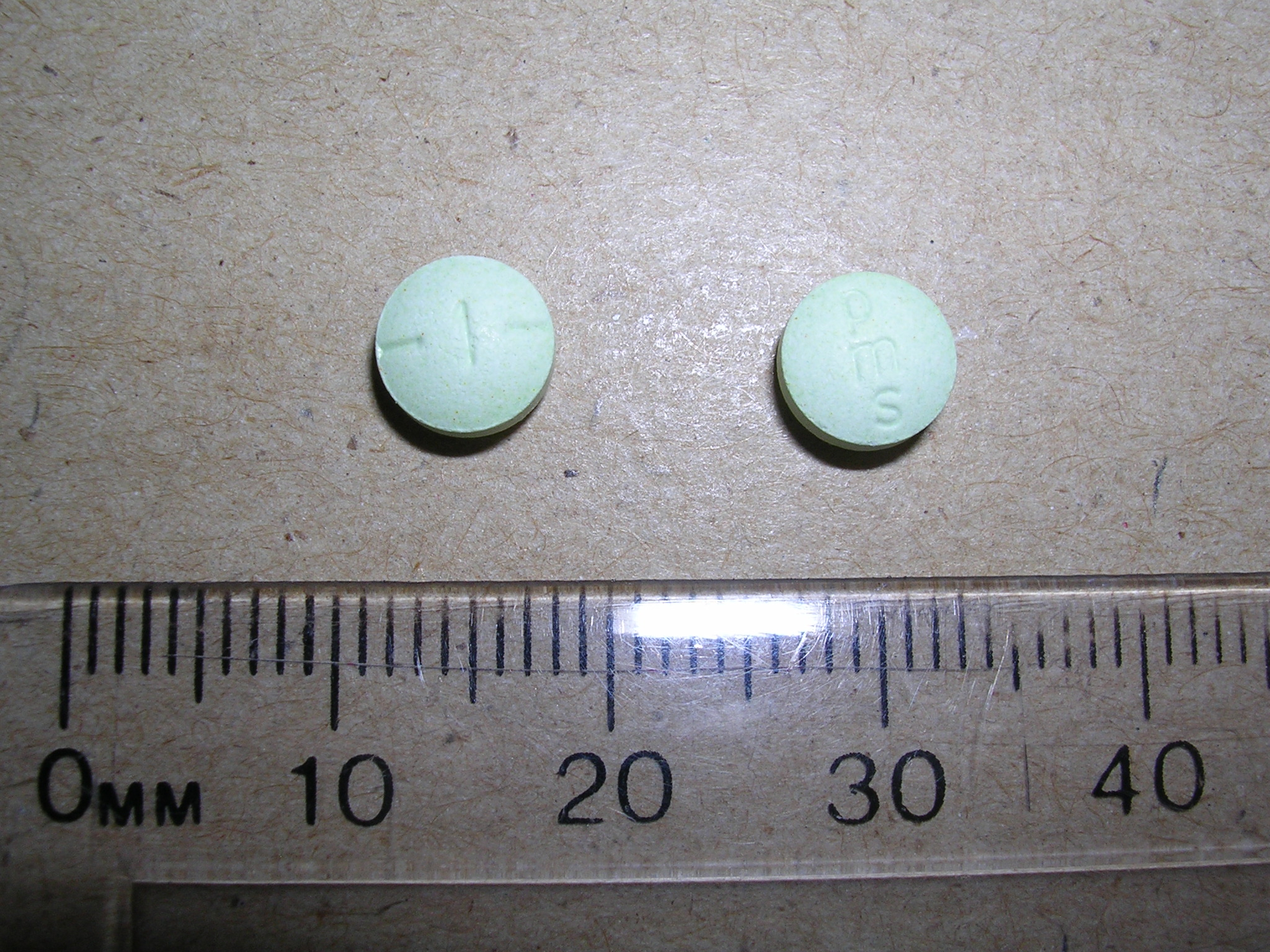

Hydromorphone is available in parenteral, rectal, subcutaneous, and oral formulations, and also can be administered via epidural or intrathecal injection. Hydromorphone also has been administered via nebulization to treat shortness of breath, but it is not used as a route for pain control due to low bioavailability. Transdermal delivery systems are also under consideration to induce local skin analgesia.

Concentrated aqueous solutions of hydromorphone hydrochloride have a visibly different refractive index from pure water, isotonic 9‰ (0·9 per cent) saline and the like, especially when stored in clear ampoules and phials may acquire a slight clear amber discolouration upon exposure to light; this reportedly has no effect on the potency of the solution, but 14-dihydromorphinones such as hydromorphone, oxymorphone, and relatives come with instructions to protect from light. Ampoules of solution which have developed a precipitate should be discarded.

Battery-powered intrathecal drug delivery systems are implanted for chronic pain when other options are ruled out, such as surgery and traditional pharmacotherapy, provided that the patient is considered a suitable fit in terms of any contraindications, both physiological and psychological.

An extended-release (once-daily) version of hydromorphone is available in the United States. Previously, an extended-release version of hydromorphone, Palladone, was available before being voluntarily withdrawn from the market after a July 2005 FDA advisory warned of a high overdose potential when taken with alcohol. As of March 2010, it is still available in the United Kingdom under the brand name Palladone SR, Nepal under the brand name Opidol, and in most other European countries, In Canada, prescription continuous release hydromorphone is available as both brand name (Hydromorph Contin) and generic formulations (Apo-Hydromorphone CR).

=== Pharmacokinetics ===
The chemical modification of the morphine molecule to hydromorphone results in higher lipid solubility and greater ability to cross the blood–brain barrier to produce more rapid and complete central nervous system penetration. On a per milligram basis, hydromorphone is considered to be five times as potent as morphine; although the conversion ratio may vary from 4–8 times, five times is in typical clinical usage.

Patients with renal abnormalities must exercise caution when dosing hydromorphone. In those with renal impairment, the half-life of hydromorphone may increase to as much as 40 hours. The typical half-life of intravenous hydromorphone is 2.3 hours. Peak plasma levels usually occur between 30 and 60 minutes after oral dosing.

The onset of action for hydromorphone administered intravenously is less than 5 minutes and within 30 minutes of oral administration (immediate release).

=== Metabolism ===
While other opioids in its class, such as codeine or oxycodone, are metabolized via CYP450 enzymes, hydromorphone is not. Hydromorphone is extensively metabolized in the liver to hydromorphone-3-glucuronide, which has no analgesic effects. As similarly seen with the morphine metabolite, morphine-3-glucuronide, a build-up in levels of hydromorphone-3-glucuronide may produce excitatory neurotoxic effects such as restlessness, myoclonus and hyperalgesia. Patients with compromised kidney function and older patients are at higher risk for metabolite accumulation.

== Chemistry ==
With a formula of C_{17}H_{19}NO_{3} and a molecular weight of 285.343, both identical to morphine, hydromorphone can be considered a structural isomer of morphine and is a hydrogenated ketone thereof.

Hydromorphone is made from morphine either by direct re-arrangement (made by reflux heating of alcoholic or acidic aqueous solution of morphine in the presence of platinum or palladium catalyst) or reduction to dihydromorphine (usually via catalytic hydrogenation), followed by oxidation with benzophenone in presence of potassium tert-butoxide or aluminium tert-butoxide (Oppenauer oxidation). The 6 ketone group may be replaced with a methylene group via the Wittig reaction to produce 6-methylenedihydrodesoxymorphine, which is 80 times stronger than morphine.

Hydromorphone is more soluble in water than morphine; therefore, hydromorphone solutions may be produced to deliver the drug in a smaller volume of water. The hydrochloride salt is soluble in three parts of water, whereas a gram of morphine hydrochloride dissolves in 16 ml of water; for all common purposes, the pure powder for hospital use can be used to produce solutions of virtually arbitrary concentration. When the powder appeared on the street, this very small volume of powder needed for a dose means that overdoses are likely for those who mistake it for heroin or other powdered narcotics, especially those that have been diluted prior to consumption.

=== Bacteria ===
Some bacteria have been shown to be able to turn morphine into closely related drugs, including hydromorphone and dihydromorphine among others. The bacterium Pseudomonas putida serotype M10 produces a naturally occurring NADH-dependent morphinone reductase that can work on unsaturated 7,8 bonds, with result that, when these bacteria are living in an aqueous solution containing morphine, significant amounts of hydromorphone form, as it is an intermediary metabolite in this process; the same goes for codeine being turned into hydrocodone.

== History ==
Hydromorphone was first synthesized in Germany in 1921 and was subsequently patented in 1923. It was introduced to the mass market in 1926 under the brand name Dilaudid, indicating its derivation and degree of similarity to morphine (by way of laudanum).

== Society and culture ==
=== Names ===
Hydromorphone is known in various countries around the world by the brand names Hydal, Dimorphone, Exalgo, Sophidone LP, Dilaudid, Hydrostat, Hydromorfan, Hydromorphan, Hymorphan, Laudicon, Opidol, Palladone, Hydromorph Contin, and others. An extended-release version of hydromorphone, called Palladone, was available for a short time in the United States before being voluntarily withdrawn from the market after a July 2005 FDA advisory warned of a high overdose potential when taken with alcohol. As of March 2010, it is still available in Nepal under the brand name Opidol, in the United Kingdom under the brand name Palladone SR, and in most other European countries.

There has also been a once-daily prolonged release version of hydromorphone available in Australia under the brand name Jurnista as of May 2009.

=== Legal status ===
In the United States, the main drug control agency, the Drug Enforcement Administration, reports an increase in annual aggregate production quotas of hydromorphone from 766 kilograms (1,689 pounds) in 1998 to 3,300 kilograms (7,300 lb) in 2006, and an increase in prescriptions in this time of 289%, from about 470,000 to 1,830,000. The 2013 production quota was 5,968 kilograms (13,157 lb).

Like all opioids used for analgesia, hydromorphone is potentially habit-forming and is listed in Schedule II of the United States Controlled Substances Act of 1970 as well as in similar levels under the drugs laws of practically all other countries and it is listed in the Single Convention On Narcotic Drugs. The DEA ACSCN for hydromorphone is 9150.

Hydromorphone is listed under the German Betäubungsmittelgesetz as a Betäubungsmittel in the most restricted schedule for medicinal drugs; it is controlled similarly in Austria (Suchtgift) under the SMG and the Swiss BetmG. The Misuse of Drugs Act 1971 (United Kingdom) and comparable French, Canadian, Australian, Italian, Czech, Croatian, Slovenian, Swedish, Polish, Spanish, Greek, Russian, and other laws similarly control it, as do regulations in virtually all other countries.

=== Use in executions ===
In 2009, Ohio approved the use of an intramuscular injection of 500 mg of hydromorphone and a supratherapeutic dose of midazolam as a backup means of carrying out executions by lethal injection when a suitable vein cannot be found for intravenous injection.

== Veterinary use ==
Hydromorphone is used as an intravenous analgesic in cats and dogs. Hydromorphone's potency is 5–10 times greater than morphine when given intravenously and the length of effect is dose dependent with times ranging 1–8 hours. Anaesthetic recovery can be prolonged from long use of hydromorphone. Hydromorphone is not useful compared to morphine when given subcutaenously in cats or epidurally in cats and dogs. Hydromorphone can provide analgesia up to 12 hours when given intravenously in horses and is also effective when given intramuscular. Hydromorphone has minimal adverse effects in horses when compared to other opioids such as morphine.
