= Noroxycodone =

Chemical compound

Clinical data
- Dependence liability: High (same oxycodone)

Identifiers
- IUPAC name: (4R,4aS,7aR,12bS)-4a-Hydroxy-9-methoxy-1,2,3,4,5,6,7a,13-octahydro-4,12-methanobenzofuro[3,2-e]isoquinoline-7-one
- CAS Number: 57664-96-7
- PubChem CID: 5489120
- ChemSpider: 4590081
- UNII: 95Q949779D
- CompTox Dashboard (EPA): DTXSID60973261
- ECHA InfoCard: 100.055.334

Chemical and physical data
- Formula: C_{17}H_{19}NO_{4}
- Molar mass: 301.342 g·mol^{−1}
- 3D model (JSmol): Interactive image
- SMILES: COC1=C2C3=C(C[C@@H]4[C@]5([C@]3(CCN4)[C@@H](O2)C(=O)CC5)O)C=C1
- InChI: InChI=1S/C17H19NO4/c1-21-11-3-2-9-8-12-17(20)5-4-10(19)15-16(17,6-7-18-12)13(9)14(11)22-15/h2-3,12,15,18,20H,4-8H2,1H3/t12-,15+,16+,17-/m1/s1; Key:RIKMCJUNPCRFMW-ISWURRPUSA-N

Noroxycodone is the major metabolite of the opioid analgesic oxycodone. It is formed from oxycodone in the liver via N-demethylation predominantly by CYP3A4. Noroxycodone binds to and activates the μ-opioid receptor (MOR) similarly to oxycodone, although with one-third of the affinity of oxycodone and 5- to 10-fold lower activational potency. However, although a potent MOR agonist, noroxycodone poorly crosses the blood-brain-barrier into the central nervous system, and for this reason, is only minimally analgesic in comparison.

== See also ==
- Norbuprenorphine
- Norbuprenorphine-3-glucuronide
- Norhydrocodone
- Normorphine
- Noroxymorphone
