= C17H21NO4 =

The formula C_{17}H_{21}NO_{4} may refer to:

- Cocaine
- Cocaine reverse ester
- Fenoterol
- Hydromorphinol
- Hyoscine (scopolamine)
- Oxymorphol
