= Norhydrocodone =

Chemical compound

Clinical data
- Other names: (5α)-3-Methoxy-4,5-epoxymorphinan-6-one
- Dependence liability: High

Identifiers
- IUPAC name: (4R,4aR,7aR,12bS)-9-Methoxy-2,3,4,4a,5,6,7a,13-octahydro-1H-4,12-methanobenzofuro[3,2-e]isoquinoline-7-one
- CAS Number: 5083-62-5
- PubChem CID: 13001738
- ChemSpider: 32698944
- UNII: 18NB5F1JT4
- CompTox Dashboard (EPA): DTXSID70198862

Chemical and physical data
- Formula: C_{17}H_{19}NO_{3}
- Molar mass: 285.343 g·mol^{−1}
- 3D model (JSmol): Interactive image
- SMILES: COC1=C2C3=C(C[C@@H]4[C@H]5[C@]3(CCN4)[C@@H](O2)C(=O)CC5)C=C1
- InChI: InChI=1S/C17H19NO3/c1-20-13-5-2-9-8-11-10-3-4-12(19)16-17(10,6-7-18-11)14(9)15(13)21-16/h2,5,10-11,16,18H,3-4,6-8H2,1H3/t10-,11+,16-,17-/m0/s1; Key:JGORUXKMRLIJSV-YNHQPCIGSA-N

Norhydrocodone is the major metabolite of the opioid analgesic hydrocodone. It is formed from hydrocodone in the liver via N-demethylation predominantly by CYP3A4. Unlike hydromorphone, a minor metabolite of hydrocodone, norhydrocodone is described as inactive. However, norhydrocodone is actually an agonist of the μ-opioid receptor with similar potency to hydrocodone, but has been found to produce only minimal analgesia when administered peripherally to animals. This is likely due to poor blood-brain-barrier and thus central nervous system penetration.

== See also ==
- Norbuprenorphine
- Norbuprenorphine-3-glucuronide
- Normorphine
- Noroxymorphone
