= C17H19NO4 =

The molecular formula C_{17}H_{19}NO_{4} may refer to:

- Fenoxycarb
- Haemanthamine
- Morphine-N-oxide (genomorphine)
- Noroxycodone
- Oxymorphone
- 14-Hydroxymorphine
- Pudafensine
