= Buprenorphine-3-glucuronide =

Chemical compound

Clinical data
- ATC code: None

Identifiers
- IUPAC name: (5α,6β,14β,18R)-17-(Cyclopropylmethyl)-18-[(2S)-2-hydroxy-3,3-dimethyl-2-butanyl]-6-methoxy-18,19-dihydro-4,5-epoxy-6,14-ethenomorphinan-2-yl β-D-glucopyranosiduronic acid
- CAS Number: 101224-22-0
- PubChem CID: 127780
- ChemSpider: 113341
- UNII: L7FYM9GI97
- CompTox Dashboard (EPA): DTXSID40906012

Chemical and physical data
- Formula: C_{35}H_{49}NO_{10}
- Molar mass: 643.774 g·mol^{−1}
- 3D model (JSmol): Interactive image
- SMILES: C[C@]([C@H]1C[C@@]23CC[C@@]1([C@H]4[C@@]25CCN([C@@H]3Cc6c5c(c(cc6)O[C@H]7[C@@H]([C@H]([C@@H]([C@H](O7)C(=O)O)O)O)O)O4)CC8CC8)OC)(C(C)(C)C)O
- InChI: InChI=1S/C35H49NO10/c1-31(2,3)32(4,42)20-15-33-10-11-35(20,43-5)30-34(33)12-13-36(16-17-6-7-17)21(33)14-18-8-9-19(26(46-30)22(18)34)44-29-25(39)23(37)24(38)27(45-29)28(40)41/h8-9,17,20-21,23-25,27,29-30,37-39,42H,6-7,10-16H2,1-5H3,(H,40,41)/t20-,21-,23+,24+,25-,27+,29-,30-,32+,33-,34+,35-/m1/s1; Key:CZULHKGIAJASAA-WWIHBJMFSA-N

Buprenorphine-3-glucuronide (B3G) is a major active metabolite of the opioid modulator buprenorphine. It has affinity for the μ-opioid receptor (K_{i} = 4.9 (± 2.7) pM), δ-opioid receptor (K_{i} = 270 nM), and nociceptin receptor (K_{i} = 36 μM), but not for the κ-opioid receptor. Whether B3G acts as an agonist or antagonist of each of the former three respective sites has yet to be determined. In rats, at the doses assayed, B3G has been found to produce a small degree of antinociception, and similarly to buprenorphine in these assays, has not been found to produce sedation, reduce locomotion, or decrease respiratory rate. Of all of the active metabolites of buprenorphine, B3G is thought to be the most similar to the parent drug. Unlike norbuprenorphine, but similarly to buprenorphine (and norbuprenorphine-3-glucuronide), B3G is not a substrate for P-glycoprotein, and hence may cross the blood-brain-barrier significantly.

== Formation ==
Glucuronosyltransferase anzymes UGT2B7 and UGT1A1 convert buprenorphine to its glucuronide by adding a sugar acid at the phenolic hydroxy group, with uridine diphosphate (UDP) as byproduct:

buprenorphine
+ UDP-glucuronate
UDP
buprenorphine-3-glucuronide

== See also ==
- Morphine-3-glucuronide
