= C25H35NO4 =

The molecular formula C_{25}H_{35}NO_{4} (molar mass: 413.54 g/mol, exact mass: 413.2566 u) may refer to:

- Dihydroetorphine, an analgesic drug
- Norbuprenorphine
