= Oxycodone =

Opioid medication

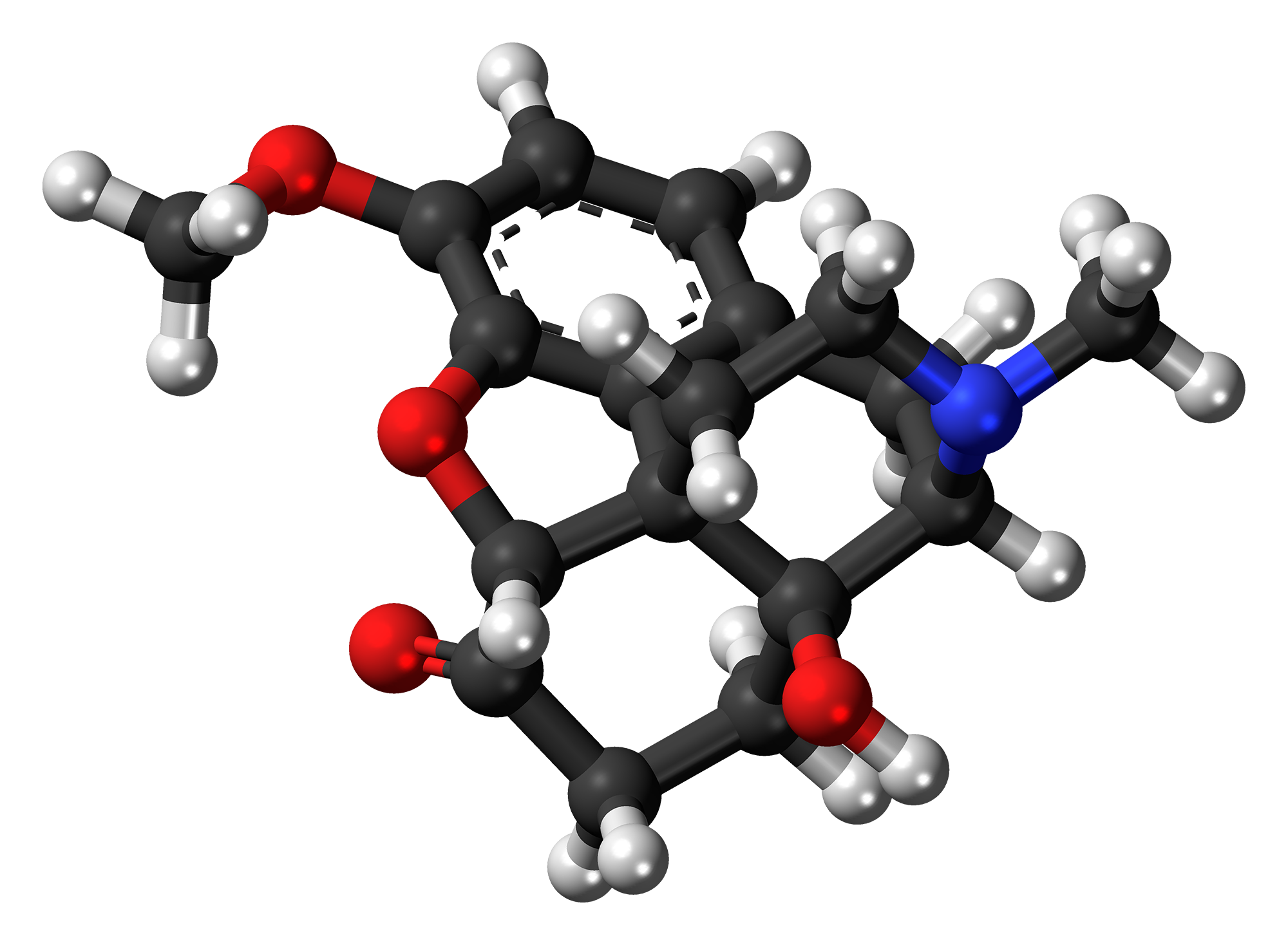

Clinical data
- Pronunciation: /ˌɒksiˈkoʊdoʊn/ OK-see-KOH-dohn
- Trade names: Roxicodone, OxyContin, Endone, others
- Other names: Eukodal, eucodal; dihydrohydroxycodeinone, 7,8-dihydro-14-hydroxycodeinone, 6-deoxy-7,8-dihydro-14-hydroxy-3-O-methyl-6-oxomorphine
- AHFS/Drugs.com: Monograph
- MedlinePlus: a682132
- License data: US DailyMed: Oxycodone
- Pregnancy category: AU: C
- Dependence liability: High
- Addiction liability: High
- Routes of administration: By mouth, sublingual, intramuscular, intravenous, intranasal, subcutaneous, transdermal, rectal, epidural
- Drug class: Opioid
- ATC code: N02AA05 (WHO) ,N02AJ17 (WHO), N02AJ18 (WHO), N02AJ19 (WHO), N02AA55 (WHO), N02AA56 (WHO)

Legal status
- Legal status: AU: S8 (Controlled drug); BR: Class A1 (Narcotic drugs); CA: Schedule I; DE: Anlage III (Special prescription form required); NZ: Class B3; UK: Class A; US: Schedule II; UN: Narcotic Schedule I; EU: Rx-only; SE: Förteckning II

Pharmacokinetic data
- Bioavailability: By mouth: 60–87%
- Protein binding: 45%
- Metabolism: Liver: mainly CYP3A, and, to a much lesser extent, CYP2D6 (~5%); 95% metabolized (i.e., 5% excreted unchanged)
- Metabolites: • Noroxycodone (25%) • Noroxymorphone (15%, free and conjugated) • Oxymorphone (11%, conjugated) • Others (e.g., minor metabolites)
- Onset of action: IR: 10–30 minutes CR: 1 hour
- Elimination half-life: IR: 2–3 hours CR: 4.5 hours
- Duration of action: IR: 3–6 hours CR: 10–12 hours
- Excretion: Urine (83%)

Identifiers
- IUPAC name: (5R,9R,13S,14S)-4,5α-Epoxy-14-hydroxy-3-methoxy-17-methylmorphinan-6-one
- CAS Number: 76-42-6
- PubChem CID: 5284603
- IUPHAR/BPS: 7093
- DrugBank: DB00497
- ChemSpider: 4447649
- UNII: CD35PMG570
- KEGG: D05312; as HCl: D00847
- ChEBI: CHEBI:7852
- ChEMBL: ChEMBL656
- CompTox Dashboard (EPA): DTXSID5023407
- ECHA InfoCard: 100.000.874

Chemical and physical data
- Formula: C_{18}H_{21}NO_{4}
- Molar mass: 315.369 g·mol^{−1}
- 3D model (JSmol): Interactive image
- Melting point: 219 °C (426 °F)
- Solubility in water: 166 (HCl)
- SMILES: O=C4[C@@H]5Oc1c2c(ccc1OC)C[C@H]3N(CC[C@]25[C@@]3(O)CC4)C
- InChI: InChI=1S/C18H21NO4/c1-19-8-7-17-14-10-3-4-12(22-2)15(14)23-16(17)11(20)5-6-18(17,21)13(19)9-10/h3-4,13,16,21H,5-9H2,1-2H3/t13-,16+,17+,18-/m1/s1; Key:BRUQQQPBMZOVGD-XFKAJCMBSA-N

Oxycodone, sold under the brand names Roxicodone and OxyContin (which is the extended-release form) among others, is a semi-synthetic opioid used medically for the treatment of moderate to severe pain. It is a highly addictive and commonly abused drug. It is usually taken orally, and is available in immediate-release and controlled-release formulations. Onset of pain relief typically begins within fifteen minutes and lasts for up to six hours with the immediate-release formulation. In the United Kingdom, it is available by injection. Combination products are also available with paracetamol (acetaminophen), ibuprofen, naloxone, naltrexone, and aspirin.

Common side effects include euphoria, constipation, nausea, vomiting, loss of appetite, drowsiness, dizziness, itching, dry mouth, and sweating. Side effects may also include addiction and dependence, substance abuse, irritability, depression or mania, delirium, hallucinations, hypoventilation, gastroparesis, bradycardia, and hypotension. Those allergic to codeine may also be allergic to oxycodone. Opioid withdrawal may occur if rapidly stopped. Oxycodone acts by activating the μ-opioid receptor. When taken by mouth, it has roughly 1.5 times the effect of the equivalent amount of morphine.

Oxycodone was originally produced from the opium poppy opiate alkaloid thebaine in 1916 in Germany. One year later, it was used medically for the first time in Germany. Oxycodone is available as a generic medication. In 2023, it was the 49th most commonly prescribed medication in the United States, with more than 13 million prescriptions. A number of abuse-deterrent formulations are available, such as in combination with naloxone or naltrexone.

== Medical uses ==
Oxycodone is used for managing moderate to severe acute or chronic pain when other treatments are not sufficient. Oxycodone improves quality of life in certain types of pain. Numerous studies have been completed, and the appropriate use of this compound does improve the quality of life of patients with long term chronic pain syndromes.

Oxycodone can be taken in an immediate-release form (4 times daily for example with the brand name Shortec) or twice daily with extended-release forms (such as with e.g. the brand name "Oxypro") and both forms are Extended-release forms of oxycodone (OxyContin) and are used for around-the-clock treatment of pain worldwide, are not to be used on an "as needed" basis, while other forms such as the immediate-release forms are indicated as to be used as rescue medications in the treatment of pain (for example for in severe cancer pain or pain after surgery). There are many forms of the drug that are recognized by the Food and Drug Administration (FDA), National Health Service (NHS) and NHS Scotland (NHS Scot) to be used for various indications.

Oxycodone is available as a controlled-release tablet. A 2006 review found that controlled-release oxycodone is comparable to immediate-release oxycodone, morphine, and hydromorphone in management of moderate to severe cancer pain, with fewer side effects than morphine. The author concluded that the controlled-release form is a valid alternative to morphine and a first-line treatment for cancer pain. In 2014, the European Association for Palliative Care recommended oxycodone by mouth as a second-line alternative to morphine by mouth for cancer pain.

In children between 11 and 16, the extended-release formulation is FDA-approved for the relief of cancer pain, trauma pain, or pain due to major surgery (for those already treated with opioids, who can tolerate at least 20 mg per day of oxycodone) – this provides an alternative to Duragesic (fentanyl), the only other extended-release opioid analgesic approved for children.

Oxycodone, in its extended-release form or in combination with naloxone, is sometimes used off-label in the treatment of severe and refractory restless legs syndrome.

=== Available forms ===
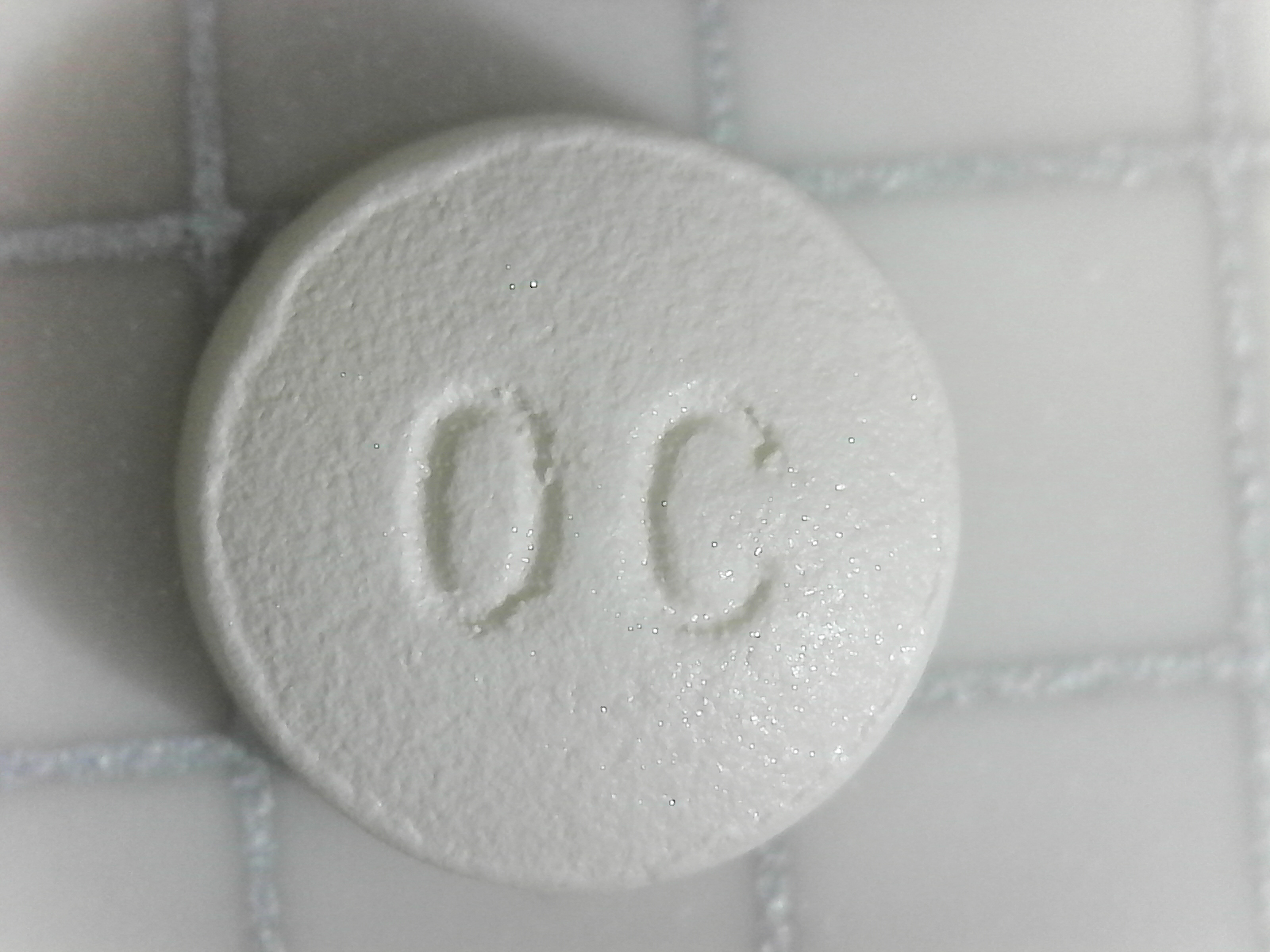
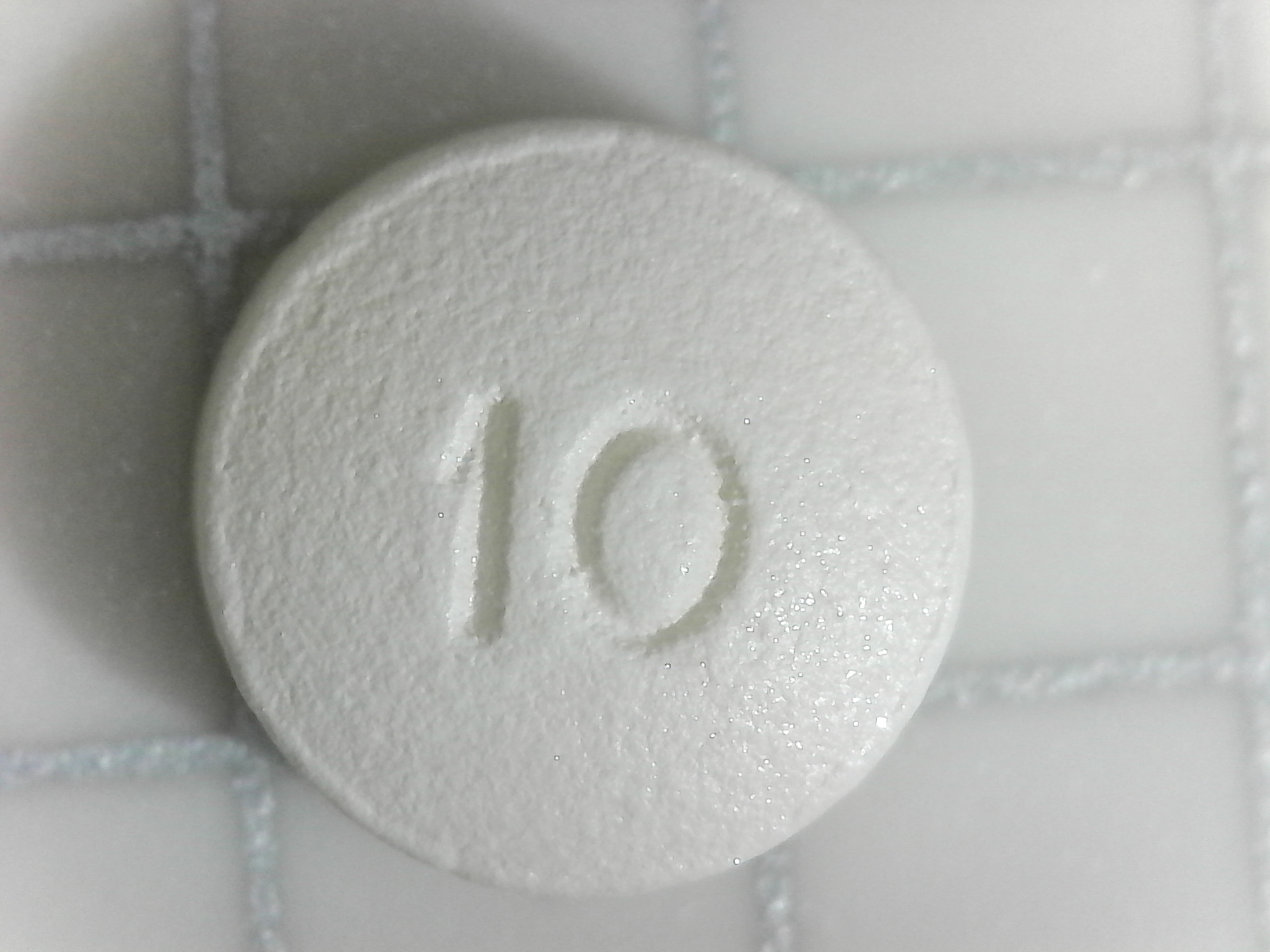
Both sides of a single 10mg OxyContin pill.

Oxycodone is available in a variety of formulations for by mouth or under the tongue:

- Immediate-release oxycodone (OxyFast, OxyIR, OxyNorm, Roxicodone, Shortec)
- Controlled-release oxycodone (OxyContin, Xtampza ER, Oxypro) – 10–12 hour duration
- Oxycodone tamper-resistant (OxyContin OTR)
- Immediate-release oxycodone with paracetamol (acetaminophen) (Percocet, Endocet, Roxicet, Tylox)
- Immediate-release oxycodone with aspirin (Endodan, Oxycodan, Percodan, Roxiprin)
- Immediate-release oxycodone with ibuprofen (Combunox)
- Controlled-release oxycodone with naloxone (Targin, Targiniq, Targinact) – 10–12 hour duration
- Controlled-release oxycodone with naltrexone (Troxyca) – 10–12 hour duration

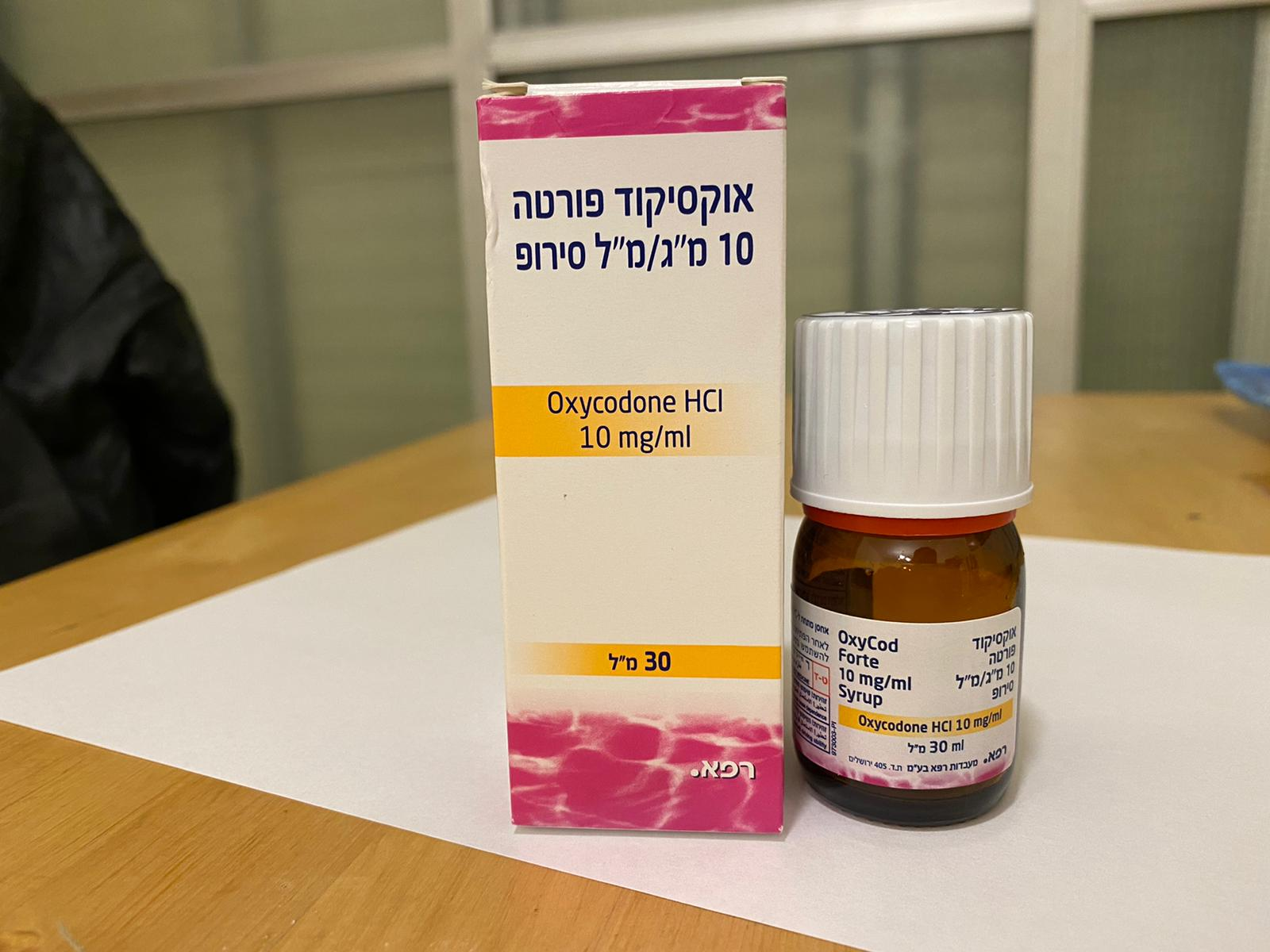
A liquid solution containing 10mg of oxycodone per 1ml

In the US, oxycodone is only approved for use by mouth, available as tablets and oral solutions. Parenteral formulations of oxycodone (brand name OxyNorm) are also available in other parts of the world, however, and are widely used in the European Union. In Spain, the Netherlands and the United Kingdom, oxycodone is approved for intravenous (IV) and intramuscular (IM) use. When first introduced in Germany during World War I, both IV and IM administrations of oxycodone were commonly used for postoperative pain management of Central Powers soldiers.

== Side effects ==
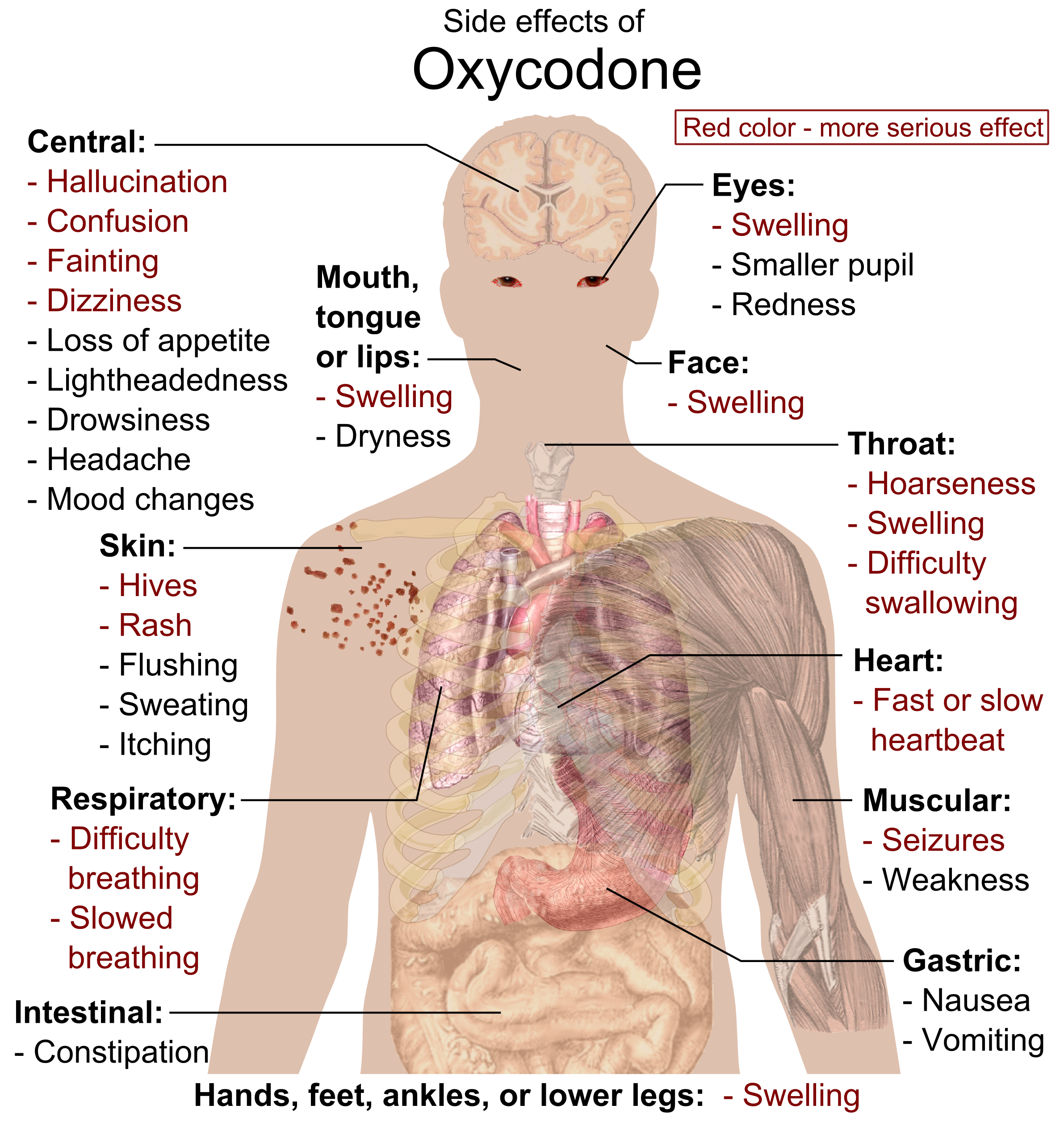
Main side effects of oxycodone

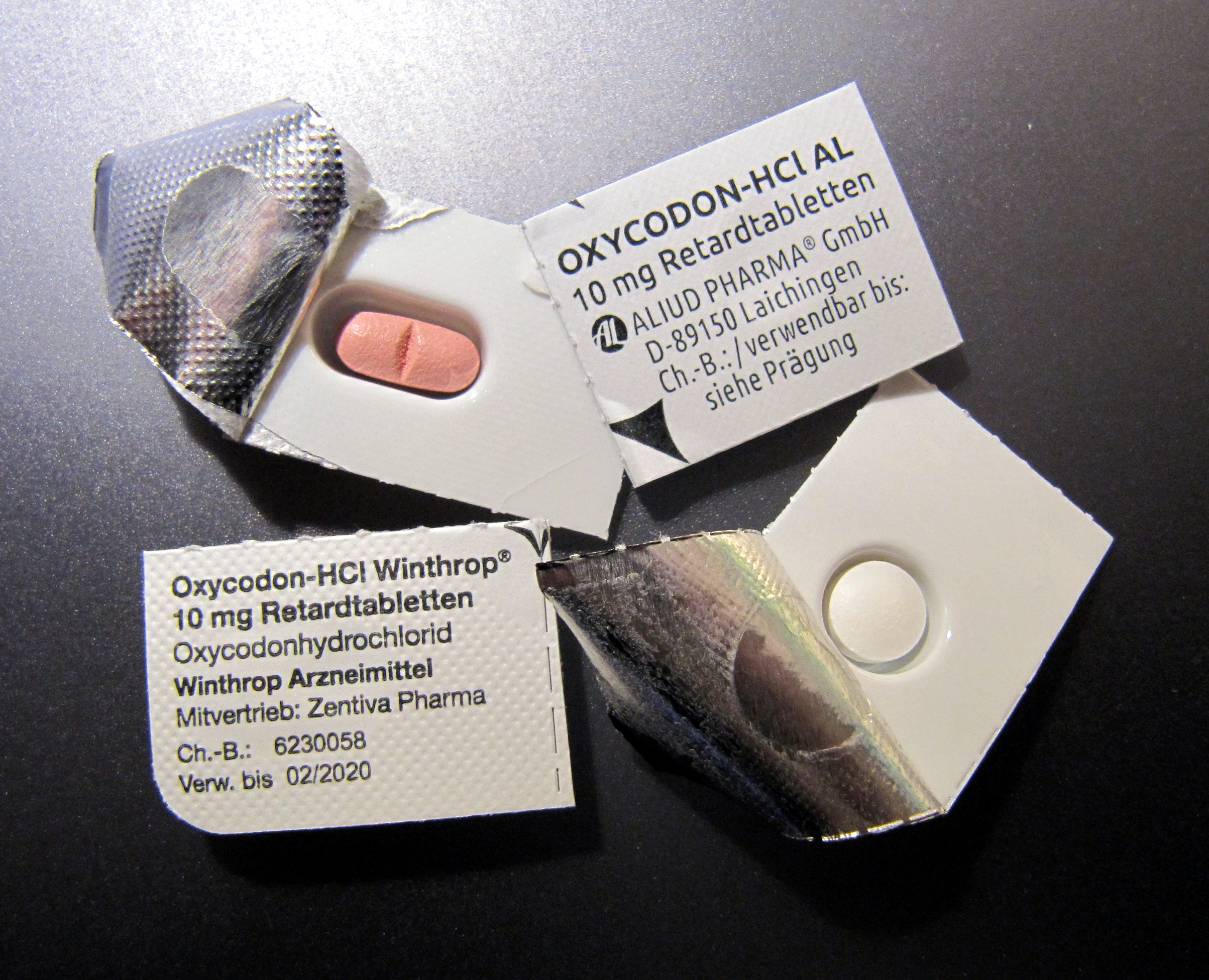
Two tablets (10 mg) of oxycodone and safety blisters

The most common side effects of oxycodone include delayed gastric emptying, euphoria, anxiolysis (a reduction in anxiety), feelings of relaxation, and respiratory depression. Common side effects of oxycodone include constipation (23%), nausea (23%), vomiting (12%), drowsiness (23%), dizziness (13%), itching (13%), dry mouth (6%), and sweating (5%). Less common side effects (experienced by less than 5% of patients) include loss of appetite, nervousness, abdominal pain, diarrhea, urinary retention, dyspnea, and hiccups.

Most side effects generally become less intense over time, although issues related to constipation are likely to continue for the duration of use. Chronic use of oxycodone and the associated constipation issues can become severe, and have been implicated in life-threatening bowel perforations. A number of specific medications including naloxegol have been developed to address opioid induced constipation.

Oxycodone in combination with naloxone in managed-release tablets has been formulated to both deter abuse and reduce opioid-induced constipation.

=== Dependence and withdrawal ===
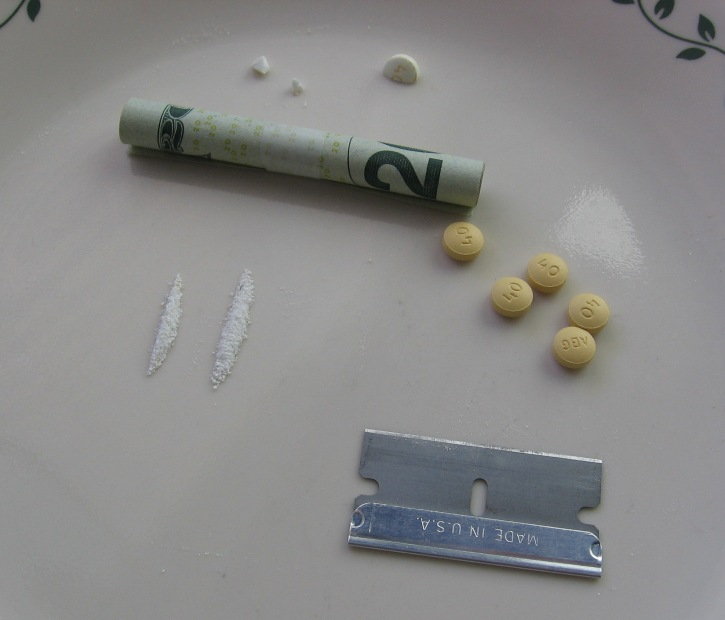
OxyContin tablets crushed into powder for insufflation (snorting). Notice the tablets at the top with the coating removed

The risk of experiencing severe withdrawal symptoms is high if a patient has become physically dependent and discontinues oxycodone abruptly. Medically, when the drug has been taken regularly over an extended period, it is withdrawn gradually rather than abruptly. People who regularly use oxycodone recreationally or at higher than prescribed doses are at even higher risk of severe withdrawal symptoms. The symptoms of oxycodone withdrawal, as with other opioids, may include "anxiety, panic attack, nausea, insomnia, muscle pain, muscle weakness, fevers, and other flu-like symptoms".

Withdrawal symptoms have also been reported in newborns whose mothers had been either injecting or orally taking oxycodone during pregnancy.

=== Hormone levels ===
As with other opioids, chronic use of oxycodone (particularly with higher doses) can often cause concurrent hypogonadism (low sex hormone levels).

== Overdose ==
In high doses, overdoses, or in some persons not tolerant to opioids, oxycodone can cause shallow breathing, slowed heart rate, cold/clammy skin, pauses in breathing, low blood pressure, constricted pupils, circulatory collapse, respiratory arrest, and death.

In 2011, it was the leading cause of drug-related deaths in the U.S. However, from 2012 onwards, heroin and fentanyl have become more common causes of drug-related deaths.

== Interactions ==
Oxycodone is metabolized by the enzymes CYP3A4 and CYP2D6. Therefore, its clearance can be altered by inhibitors and inducers of these enzymes, increasing and decreasing half-life, respectively. (For lists of CYP3A4 and CYP2D6 inhibitors and inducers, see here and here, respectively.) Natural genetic variation in these enzymes can also influence the clearance of oxycodone, which may be related to the wide inter-individual variability in its half-life and potency.

Ritonavir or lopinavir/ritonavir greatly increase plasma concentrations of oxycodone in healthy human volunteers due to inhibition of CYP3A4 and CYP2D6. Rifampicin greatly reduces plasma concentrations of oxycodone due to strong induction of CYP3A4. There is also a case report of fosphenytoin, a CYP3A4 inducer, dramatically reducing the analgesic effects of oxycodone in a chronic pain patient. Dosage or medication adjustments may be necessary in each case.

== Pharmacology ==
=== Pharmacodynamics ===
Oxycodone (and metabolite) at opioid receptors
Compound	Affinities (K_{i})			Ratio	Ref.
Compound	MOR	DOR	KOR	MOR:DOR:KOR	Ref.
Oxycodone	18 nM	958 nM	677 nM	1:53:38	
Oxymorphone	0.78 nM	50 nM	137 nM	1:64:176	

Equianalgesic doses
Compound	Route	Dose
Codeine	PO	200 mg
Hydrocodone	PO	20–30 mg
Hydromorphone	PO	7.5 mg
Hydromorphone	IV	1.5 mg
Morphine	PO	30 mg
Morphine	IV	10 mg
Oxycodone	PO	20 mg
Oxycodone	IV	10 mg
Oxymorphone	PO	10 mg
Oxymorphone	IV	1 mg

Oxycodone, a semi-synthetic opioid, is a highly selective full agonist of the μ-opioid receptor (MOR). This is the main biological target of the endogenous opioid neuropeptide β-endorphin. Oxycodone has low affinity for the δ-opioid receptor (DOR) and the κ-opioid receptor (KOR), where it is an agonist similarly. After oxycodone binds to the MOR, a G protein-complex is released, which inhibits the release of neurotransmitters by the cell by decreasing the amount of cAMP produced, closing calcium channels, and opening potassium channels. Opioids like oxycodone are thought to produce their analgesic effects via activation of the MOR in the midbrain periaqueductal gray (PAG) and rostral ventromedial medulla (RVM). Conversely, they are thought to produce reward and addiction via activation of the MOR in the mesolimbic reward pathway, including in the ventral tegmental area, nucleus accumbens, and ventral pallidum. Tolerance to the analgesic and rewarding effects of opioids is complex and occurs due to receptor-level tolerance (e.g., MOR downregulation), cellular-level tolerance (e.g., cAMP upregulation), and system-level tolerance (e.g., neural adaptation due to induction of ΔFosB expression).

Taken orally, 20 mg of immediate-release oxycodone is considered to be equivalent in analgesic effect to 30 mg of morphine, while extended release oxycodone is considered to be twice as potent as oral morphine.

Similarly to most other opioids, oxycodone increases prolactin secretion, but its influence on testosterone levels is unknown. Unlike morphine, oxycodone lacks immunosuppressive activity (measured by natural killer cell activity and interleukin 2 production in vitro); the clinical relevance of this has not been clarified.

==== Active metabolites ====
A few of the metabolites of oxycodone have also been found to be active as MOR agonists, some of which notably have much higher affinity for (as well as higher efficacy at) the MOR in comparison. Oxymorphone possesses 3- to 5-fold higher affinity for the MOR than does oxycodone, while noroxycodone and noroxymorphone possess one-third of and 3-fold higher affinity for the MOR, respectively, and MOR activation is 5- to 10-fold less with noroxycodone but 2-fold higher with noroxymorphone relative to oxycodone. Noroxycodone, noroxymorphone, and oxymorphone also have longer biological half-lives than oxycodone.

Pharmacology of oxycodone and metabolites
Compound	K_{i}	EC_{50}	C_{max}	AUC
Oxycodone	16.0 nM	343 nM	23.2 ± 8.6 ng/mL	236 ± 102 ng/h/mL
Oxymorphone	0.36 nM	42.8 nM	0.82 ± 0.85 ng/mL	12.3 ± 12 ng/h/mL
Noroxycodone	57.1 nM	1930 nM	15.2 ± 4.5 ng/mL	233 ± 102 ng/h/mL
Noroxymorphone	5.69 nM	167 nM	ND	ND
K_{i} is for [^{3}H]diprenorphine displacement. (Note that diprenorphine is a non-selective opioid receptor ligand, so this is not MOR-specific.) EC_{50} is for hMOR1 GTPyS binding. C_{max} and AUC levels are for 20 mg CR oxycodone.

However, despite the greater in vitro activity of some of its metabolites, it has been determined that oxycodone itself is responsible for 83.0% and 94.8% of its analgesic effect following oral and intravenous administration, respectively. Oxymorphone plays only a minor role, being responsible for 15.8% and 4.5% of the analgesic effect of oxycodone after oral and intravenous administration, respectively. Although the CYP2D6 genotype and the route of administration result in differential rates of oxymorphone formation, the unchanged parent compound remains the major contributor to the overall analgesic effect of oxycodone. In contrast to oxycodone and oxymorphone, noroxycodone and noroxymorphone, while also potent MOR agonists, poorly cross the blood–brain barrier into the central nervous system, and for this reason are only minimally analgesic in comparison.

==== κ-opioid receptor ====
In 1997, a group of Australian researchers proposed (based on a study in rats) that oxycodone acts on KORs, unlike morphine, which acts upon MORs. Further research by this group indicated the drug appears to be a high-affinity κ_{2b}-opioid receptor agonist. However, this conclusion has been disputed, primarily on the basis that oxycodone produces effects that are typical of MOR agonists. In 2006, research by a Japanese group suggested the effect of oxycodone is mediated by different receptors in different situations. Specifically in diabetic mice, the KOR appears to be involved in the antinociceptive effects of oxycodone, while in nondiabetic mice, the μ_{1}-opioid receptor seems to be primarily responsible for these effects.

=== Pharmacokinetics ===
==== Instant-release absorption profiles and Tmax ====
Oxycodone can be administered orally, intravenously, via intravenous, intramuscular, or subcutaneous injection. Along with rectal, sublingual, buccal or intranasal drug delivery. The bioavailability of oral administration of oxycodone averages within a range of 60 to 87%, with rectal administration yielding the same results; Intranasal administration of oxycodone has a bioavailability of ~77%, the same half life as oral oxycodone, along with faster Tmax previously reported as 47% for nasal spray administration due to the solution in the study exceeding the 0.3- to 0.4-mL nasal mucosa limit. Buccal bioavailability ~55%, Tmax ~60 min. Sublingual bioavailability 20% (non alkalized) ~55% (alkalized) Tmax ~60 minutes.

After a dose of conventional (immediate-release) oral oxycodone, the onset of action is 10 to 30 minutes, and peak plasma levels of the drug are attained within roughly 30 to 60 minutes; in contrast, after a dose of OxyContin (an oral controlled-release formulation), peak plasma levels of oxycodone occur in about three hours. Mean serum concentration of controlled-release oxycodone peaks at 78 ng/ml at 1 hour and drops to 20 ng/ml at 8 hours and under 10 ng/ml at 12 hours. The duration of instant-release oxycodone is 3 to 6 hours, although this can be variable depending on the individual.

==== Distribution ====
Oxycodone has a volume of distribution of 2.6L/kg, in the blood it is distributed to skeletal muscle, liver, intestinal tract, lungs, spleen, and brain. At equilibrium the unbound concentration in the brain is threefold higher than the unbound concentration in blood. Conventional oral preparations start to reduce pain within 10 to 15 minutes on an empty stomach; in contrast, OxyContin starts to reduce pain within one hour.

==== Metabolism ====
The metabolism of oxycodone in humans occurs in the liver mainly via the cytochrome P450 system and is extensive (about 95%) and complex, with many minor pathways and resulting metabolites. Around 10% (range 8–14%) of a dose of oxycodone is excreted essentially unchanged (unconjugated or conjugated) in the urine. The major metabolites of oxycodone are noroxycodone (70%), noroxymorphone ("relatively high concentrations"), and oxymorphone (5%). The immediate metabolism of oxycodone in humans is as follows:

- N-Demethylation to noroxycodone predominantly via CYP3A4
- O-Demethylation to oxymorphone predominantly via CYP2D6
- 6-Ketoreduction to 6α- and 6β-oxycodol
- N-Oxidation to oxycodone-N-oxide

In humans, N-demethylation of oxycodone to noroxycodone by CYP3A4 is the major metabolic pathway, accounting for 45% ± 21% of a dose of oxycodone, while O-demethylation of oxycodone into oxymorphone by CYP2D6 and 6-ketoreduction of oxycodone into 6-oxycodols represent relatively minor metabolic pathways, accounting for 11% ± 6% and 8% ± 6% of a dose of oxycodone, respectively.

Several of the immediate metabolites of oxycodone are subsequently conjugated with glucuronic acid and excreted in the urine. 6α-Oxycodol and 6β-oxycodol are further metabolized by N-demethylation to nor-6α-oxycodol and nor-6β-oxycodol, respectively, and by N-oxidation to 6α-oxycodol-N-oxide and 6β-oxycodol-N-oxide (which can subsequently be glucuronidated as well). Oxymorphone is also further metabolized, as follows:

- 3-Glucuronidation to oxymorphone-3-glucuronide predominantly via UGT2B7
- 6-Ketoreduction to 6α-oxymorphol and 6β-oxymorphol
- N-Demethylation to noroxymorphone

The first pathway of the above three accounts for 40% of the metabolism of oxymorphone, making oxymorphone-3-glucuronide the main metabolite of oxymorphone, while the latter two pathways account for less than 10% of the metabolism of oxymorphone. After N-demethylation of oxymorphone, noroxymorphone is further glucuronidated to noroxymorphone-3-glucuronide.

Because oxycodone is metabolized by the cytochrome P450 system in the liver, its pharmacokinetics can be influenced by genetic polymorphisms and drug interactions concerning this system, as well as by liver function. Some people are fast metabolizers of oxycodone, while others are slow metabolizers, resulting in polymorphism-dependent alterations in relative analgesia and toxicity. While higher CYP2D6 activity increases the effects of oxycodone (owing to increased conversion into oxymorphone), higher CYP3A4 activity has the opposite effect and decreases the effects of oxycodone (owing to increased metabolism into noroxycodone and noroxymorphone). The dose of oxycodone must be reduced in patients with reduced liver function.

==== Elimination ====
The clearance of oxycodone is 0.8 L/min. Oxycodone and its metabolites are mainly excreted in urine. Therefore, oxycodone accumulates in patients with kidney impairment. Oxycodone is eliminated in the urine 10% as unchanged oxycodone, 45% ± 21% as N-demethylated metabolites (noroxycodone, noroxymorphone, noroxycodols), 11 ± 6% as O-demethylated metabolites (oxymorphone, oxymorphols), and 8% ± 6% as 6-keto-reduced metabolites (oxycodols).

==== Duration of action ====
Oral oxycodone has a half-life of 4.5 hours. The manufacturer of OxyContin (a controlled-release preparation of oxycodone), Purdue Pharma, claimed in its 1992 patent application that the duration of action of OxyContin is 12 hours in "90% of patients". Purdue has never performed any clinical studies in which OxyContin was given at more frequent intervals. In a separate filing, Purdue claimed that controlled-release oxycodone "provides pain relief in said patient for at least 12 hours after administration". However, in 2016, an investigation by the Los Angeles Times found that "the drug wears off hours early in many people", inducing symptoms of opiate withdrawal and intense cravings for OxyContin. One doctor, Lawrence Robbins, told journalists that over 70% of his patients would report that OxyContin would only provide 4–7 hours of relief. Doctors in the 1990s often would switch their patients to a dosing schedule of once every eight hours when patients complained that the duration of action for OxyContin was too short to be taken only twice a day.

Purdue strongly discouraged the practice: Purdue's medical director Robert Reder wrote to one doctor in 1995 that "OxyContin has been developed for [12-hour] dosing...I request that you not use a [8-hourly] dosing regimen." Purdue repeatedly released memos to its sales representatives ordering them to remind doctors not to deviate from a 12-hour dosing schedule. One such memo read, "There is no Q8 dosing with OxyContin... [8-hour dosing] needs to be nipped in the bud. NOW!!" The journalists who covered the investigation argued that Purdue Pharma has insisted on a 12-hour duration of action for nearly all patients, despite evidence to the contrary, to protect the reputation of OxyContin as a 12-hour drug and the willingness of health insurance and managed care companies to cover OxyContin despite its high cost relative to generic opiates such as morphine.

Purdue sales representatives were instructed to encourage doctors to write prescriptions for larger 12-hour doses instead of more frequent dosing. An August 1996 memo to Purdue sales representatives in Tennessee entitled "$$$$$$$$$$$$$ It's Bonus Time in the Neighborhood!" reminded the representatives that their commissions would dramatically increase if they were successful in convincing doctors to prescribe larger doses. Los Angeles Times journalists argue using interviews from opioid addiction experts that such high doses of OxyContin spaced 12 hours apart create a combination of agony during opiate withdrawal (lower lows) and a schedule of reinforcement that relieves this agony fostering addiction.

As of 2026, the prescribing information for OxyContin still specifies a controversial 12-hour dosing schedule - which experts say promotes addiction - as the only option; it also still states, "there are no well-controlled clinical studies evaluating the safety and efficacy with dosing more frequently than every 12 hours."

== Chemistry ==
Oxycodone's chemical name is derived from codeine. The chemical structures are similar, differing only in that

- Oxycodone has a hydroxy group at carbon-14 (codeine has just a hydrogen in its place)
- Oxycodone has a 7,8-dihydro feature. Codeine has a double bond between those two carbons; and
- Oxycodone has a carbonyl group (as in ketones) in place of the hydroxyl group of codeine.

It is also similar to hydrocodone, differing only in that it has a hydroxyl group at carbon-14.

=== Biosynthesis ===
In terms of biosynthesis, oxycodone has been found naturally in nectar extracts from the orchid family Epipactis helleborine; together along with other chemicals: 3-{2-{3-{3-benzyloxypropyl}-3-indol and 7,8-didehydro-4,5-epoxy-3,6-d-morphinan.

Thodey et al., 2014 introduce a microbial compound manufacturing system for compounds including oxycodone. The Thodey platform produces both natural and semisynthetic opioids including this one. This system uses Saccharomyces cerevisiae with transgenes from Papaver somniferum (the opium poppy) and Pseudomonas putida to turn a thebaine input into other opiates and opioids.

=== Detection in biological fluids ===
Oxycodone or its major metabolites may be measured in blood or urine to monitor for clearance, non-medical use, confirm a diagnosis of poisoning, or assist in a medicolegal death investigation. Many commercial opiate screening tests cross-react appreciably with oxycodone and its metabolites, but chromatographic techniques can easily distinguish oxycodone from other opiates.

== History ==
Martin Freund and (Jakob) Edmund Speyer of the University of Frankfurt in Germany published the first synthesis of oxycodone from thebaine in 1916. When Freund died, in 1920, Speyer wrote his obituary for the German Chemical Society. Speyer, born to a Jewish family in Frankfurt am Main in 1878, became a victim of the Holocaust. He died on 5 May 1942, the second day of deportations from the Lodz Ghetto; his death was noted in the ghetto's chronicle.

The first clinical use of the drug was documented in 1917, the year after it was first developed. It was first introduced to the U.S. market in May 1939. In early 1928, Merck introduced a combination product containing scopolamine, oxycodone, and ephedrine under the German initials for the ingredients SEE, which was later renamed Scophedal (SCOpolamine, ePHEDrine, and eukodAL) in 1942. It was last manufactured in 1987 but can be compounded. This combination is essentially an oxycodone analogue of the morphine-based "twilight sleep", with ephedrine added to reduce circulatory and respiratory effects. The drug became known as the "Miracle Drug of the 1930s" in Continental Europe and elsewhere and it was the Wehrmacht's choice for a battlefield analgesic for a time. The drug was expressly designed to provide what the patent application and package insert referred to as "very deep analgesia and profound and intense euphoria" as well as tranquillisation and anterograde amnesia useful for surgery and battlefield wounding cases. Oxycodone was allegedly chosen over other common opiates for this product because it had been shown to produce less sedation at equianalgesic doses compared to morphine, hydromorphone (Dilaudid), and hydrocodone (Dicodid).

During Operation Himmler, Skophedal was also reportedly injected in massive overdose into the prisoners dressed in Polish Army uniforms in the staged incident on 1 September 1939 which opened the Second World War.

The personal notes of Adolf Hitler's physician, Theodor Morell, indicate Hitler received repeated injections of "Eukodal" (oxycodone; produced by Merck) and Scophedal, as well as Dolantin (pethidine), codeine, and morphine less frequently; oxycodone could not be obtained after late January 1945.

In the United States, the Controlled Substances Act (CSA) was passed by the United States Congress and signed into law by President Richard Nixon on 27 October 1970. The passing of the CSA resulted in all products containing oxycodone being classified as a Schedule II controlled substance.

In the early 1990s, Purdue Pharma, a privately held company based in Stamford, Connecticut, developed a controlled-release version of oxycodone: the prescription painkiller OxyContin ("contin" being short for "continuous", reflecting a longer duration of pain relief). It was approved by the FDA in 1995 after no long-term studies and no assessment of its addictive capabilities. David Kessler, the FDA commissioner at the time, later said of the approval of OxyContin: "No doubt it was a mistake. It was certainly one of the worst medical mistakes, a major mistake." Upon its release in 1995, OxyContin was hailed as a medical breakthrough, a long-lasting narcotic that could help patients with moderate to severe pain. The drug became a blockbuster and has reportedly generated some US$35 billion in revenue for Purdue.

== Society and culture ==
=== Opioid epidemic ===
Oxycodone, like other opioid analgesics, tends to induce feelings of euphoria, relaxation, and reduced anxiety in those who are occasional users. The abuse of oxycodone, as well as related opioids more broadly, is not unique to the United States and it is a common drug of abuse globally.

==== United States ====
Oxycodone is the most widely recreationally used opioid in America. In the United States, more than 12 million people use opioid drugs recreationally. The U.S. Department of Health and Human Services estimates that about 11 million people in the U.S. consume oxycodone in a non-medical way annually.

Opioids were responsible for 49,000 of the 72,000 drug overdose deaths in the U.S. in 2017. In 2007, about 42,800 emergency room visits occurred due to "episodes" involving oxycodone. In 2008, recreational use of oxycodone and hydrocodone was involved in 14,800 deaths. Some of the cases were due to overdoses of the acetaminophen component, resulting in fatal liver damage.

In September 2013, the US Food and Drug Administration (FDA) released updated labeling guidelines for long-acting and extended-release opioids requiring manufacturers to remove moderate pain as an indication for use, instead stating the drug is for "pain severe enough to require daily, around-the-clock, long term opioid treatment". The updated labeling does not restrict physicians from prescribing opioids for moderate pain, as needed.

After OxyContin was changed to deter abuse, some recreational users switched to heroin, which is cheaper and easier to obtain.

===== Lawsuits =====
In October 2017, The New Yorker published a story on Mortimer Sackler and Purdue Pharma regarding their ties to the production and manipulation of the oxycodone markets. The article links Raymond and Arthur Sackler's business practices with the rise of direct pharmaceutical marketing and eventually to the rise of addiction to oxycodone in the United States. The article implies that the Sackler family bears some responsibility for the opioid epidemic in the United States. In 2019, The New York Times ran a piece confirming that Richard Sackler, the son of Raymond Sackler, told company officials in 2008 to "measure our performance by Rx's by strength, giving higher measures to higher strengths". This was verified with documents tied to a lawsuit – which was filed by the Massachusetts attorney general, Maura Healey – claiming that Purdue Pharma and members of the Sackler family knew that high doses of OxyContin over long periods would increase the risk of serious side effects, including addiction. Despite Purdue Pharma's proposal for a US$12 billion settlement of the lawsuit, the attorneys general of 23 states, including Massachusetts, rejected the settlement offer in September 2019.

==== Australia ====
The non-medical use of oxycodone existed since the early 1970s, but by 2015, 91% of a national sample of injecting drug users in Australia had reported using oxycodone, and 27% had injected it in the last six months.

==== Canada ====
Opioid-related deaths in Ontario had increased by 242% from 1969 to 2014. By 2009 in Ontario there were more deaths from oxycodone overdoses than from cocaine overdoses. Deaths from opioid pain relievers had increased from 13.7 deaths per million residents in 1991 to 27.2 deaths per million residents in 2004. The non-medical use of oxycodone in Canada became a problem. Areas where oxycodone is most problematic are Atlantic Canada and Ontario, where its non-medical use is prevalent in rural towns and in many smaller to medium-sized cities. Oxycodone is also widely available across Western Canada, but methamphetamine and heroin are more serious problems in larger cities, while oxycodone is more common in rural towns. Oxycodone is diverted through doctor shopping, prescription forgery, pharmacy theft, and overprescription.

The recent formulations of oxycodone, particularly Purdue Pharma's crush-, chew-, injection- and dissolve-resistant OxyNEO which replaced the banned OxyContin product in Canada in early 2012, have led to a decline in the recreational use of this opiate but have increased the recreational use of the more potent drug fentanyl. According to a Canadian Centre on Substance Abuse study quoted in Maclean's magazine, there were at least 655 fentanyl-related deaths in Canada in five years.

In Alberta, the Blood Tribe police claimed that from the fall of 2014 through January 2015, oxycodone pills or a lethal fake variation referred to as Oxy 80s containing fentanyl made in illegal labs by members of organized crime were responsible for ten deaths on the Blood Reserve, which is located southwest of Lethbridge, Alberta. Province-wide, approximately 120 Albertans died from fentanyl-related overdoses in 2014.

==== United Kingdom ====
Prescriptions of Oxycodone rose in Scotland by 430% between 2002 and 2008, prompting fears of usage problems that would mirror those of the United States. The first known death due to overdose in the UK occurred in 2002.

==== Preventive measures ====
In August 2010, Purdue Pharma reformulated their long-acting oxycodone line, marketed as OxyContin, using a polymer, Intac, to make the pills more difficult to crush or dissolve in water to reduce non-medical use of OxyContin. Inactive ingredients/excipients are butylated hydroxytoluene (BHT), hypromellose, polyethylene glycol 400, polyethylene oxide, magnesium stearate, and titanium dioxide. The FDA approved relabeling the reformulated version as abuse-resistant in April 2013.

Pfizer manufactures a preparation of short-acting oxycodone, marketed as Oxecta, which contains inactive ingredients, referred to as tamper-resistant Aversion Technology. Approved by the FDA in the U.S. in June 2011, the new formulation, while not being able to deter oral recreational use, makes crushing, chewing, snorting, or injecting the opioid impractical because of a change in its chemical properties.

=== Legal status ===
Oxycodone is subject to international conventions on narcotic drugs. In addition, oxycodone is subject to national laws that differ by country. The 1931 Convention for Limiting the Manufacture and Regulating the Distribution of Narcotic Drugs of the League of Nations included oxycodone. The 1961 Single Convention on Narcotic Drugs of the United Nations, which replaced the 1931 convention, categorized oxycodone in Schedule I. Global restrictions on Schedule I drugs include "limit[ing] exclusively to medical and scientific purposes the production, manufacture, export, import, distribution of, trade in, use and possession of" these drugs; "requir[ing] medical prescriptions for the supply or dispensation of [these] drugs to individuals"; and "prevent[ing] the accumulation" of quantities of these drugs "in excess of those required for the normal conduct of business".

==== Australia ====
Oxycodone is in Schedule I (derived from the Single Convention on Narcotic Drugs) of the Commonwealth's Narcotic Drugs Act 1967. In addition, it is in Schedule 8 of the Australian Standard for the Uniform Scheduling of Drugs and Poisons ("Poisons Standard"), meaning it is a "controlled drug... which should be available for use but require[s] restriction of manufacture, supply, distribution, possession and use to reduce abuse, misuse and physical or psychological dependence".

==== Canada ====
Oxycodone is a controlled substance under Schedule I of the Controlled Drugs and Substances Act (CDSA).

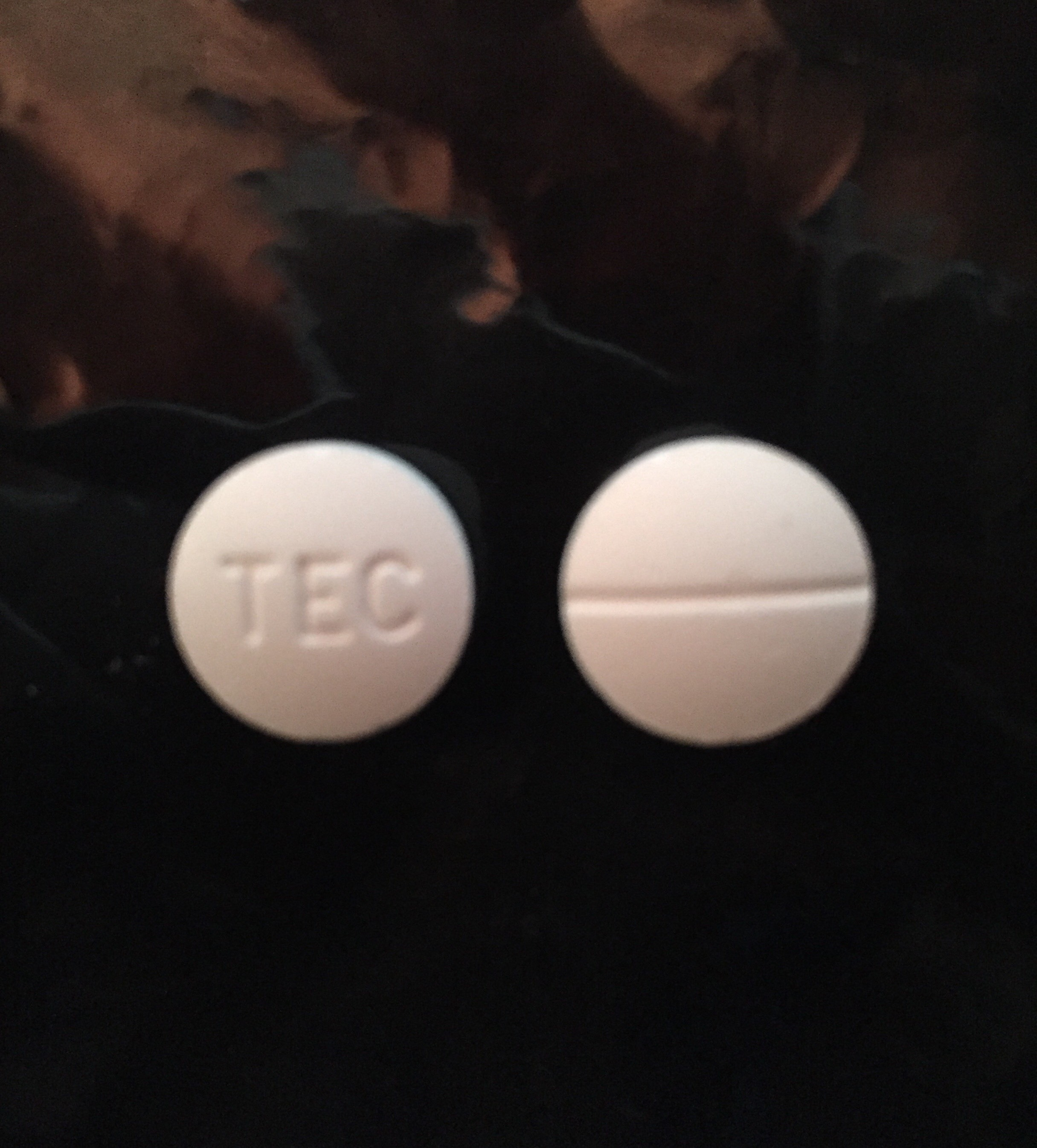
Canadian oxycodone HCL/acetaminophen 5/325 mg tablet

In February 2012, Ontario passed legislation to allow the expansion of an already existing drug-tracking system for publicly funded drugs to include those that are privately insured. This database will function to identify and monitor patient's attempts to seek prescriptions from multiple doctors or retrieve them from multiple pharmacies. Other provinces have proposed similar legislation, while some, such as Nova Scotia, have legislation already in effect for monitoring prescription drug use. These changes have coincided with other changes in Ontario's legislation to target the misuse of painkillers and high addiction rates to drugs such as oxycodone. As of 29 February 2012, Ontario passed legislation delisting oxycodone from the province's public drug benefit program. This was a first for any province to delist a drug based on addictive properties. The new law prohibits prescriptions for OxyNeo except to certain patients under the Exceptional Access Program including palliative care and in other extenuating circumstances. Patients already prescribed oxycodone will receive coverage for an additional year for OxyNeo, and after that, it will be disallowed unless designated under the exceptional access program.

Much of the legislative activity has stemmed from Purdue Pharma's decision in 2011 to begin a modification of OxyContin's composition to make it more difficult to crush for snorting or injecting. The new formulation, OxyNeo, is intended to be preventive in this regard and retain its effectiveness as a painkiller. Since introducing its Narcotics Safety and Awareness Act, Ontario has committed to focusing on drug addiction, particularly in the monitoring and identification of problem opioid prescriptions, as well as the education of patients, doctors, and pharmacists. This Act, introduced in 2010, commits to the establishment of a unified database to fulfil this intention. Both the public and medical community have received the legislation positively, though concerns about the ramifications of legal changes have been expressed. Because laws are largely provincially regulated, many speculate a national strategy is needed to prevent smuggling across provincial borders from jurisdictions with looser restrictions.

In 2015, Purdue Pharma's abuse-resistant OxyNEO and six generic versions of OxyContin had been on the Canada-wide approved list for prescriptions since 2012. In June 2015, then-federal Minister of Health Rona Ambrose announced that within three years, all oxycodone products sold in Canada would need to be tamper-resistant. Some experts warned that the generic product manufacturers may not have the technology to achieve that goal, possibly giving Purdue Pharma a monopoly on this opiate.

Several class-action suits across Canada have been launched against the Purdue group of companies and affiliates. Claimants argue the pharmaceutical manufacturers did not meet a standard of care and were negligent in doing so. These lawsuits reference earlier judgments in the United States, which held that Purdue was liable for wrongful marketing practices and misbranding. Since 2007, the Purdue companies have paid over CAN$650 million in settling litigation or facing criminal fines.

==== Germany ====
The drug is in Appendix III of the Narcotics Act (Betäubungsmittelgesetz or BtMG). The law allows only physicians, dentists, and veterinarians to prescribe oxycodone and the federal government to regulate the prescriptions (e.g., by requiring reporting).

==== Hong Kong ====
Oxycodone is regulated under Part I of Schedule 1 of Hong Kong's Chapter 134 Dangerous Drugs Ordinance.

==== Japan ====
Oxycodone is a restricted drug in Japan. Its import and export are strictly restricted to specially designated organizations having a prior permit to import it. In a high-profile case an American who was a top Toyota executive living in Tokyo, who claimed to be unaware of the law, was arrested for importing oxycodone into Japan.

==== Singapore ====
Oxycodone is listed as a Class A drug in the Misuse of Drugs Act of Singapore, which means offences concerning the drug attract the most severe level of punishment. A conviction for unauthorized manufacture of the drug attracts a minimum sentence of 10 years of imprisonment and corporal punishment of 5 strokes of the cane, and a maximum sentence of life imprisonment or 30 years of imprisonment and 15 strokes of the cane. The minimum and maximum penalties for unauthorized trafficking in the drug are respectively 5 years of imprisonment and 5 strokes of the cane, and 20 years of imprisonment and 15 strokes of the cane.

==== United Kingdom ====
Oxycodone is a Class A drug under the Misuse of Drugs Act 1971. For Class A drugs, which are "considered to be the most likely to cause harm", possession without a prescription is punishable by up to seven years in prison, an unlimited fine, or both. Dealing of the drug illegally is punishable by up to life imprisonment, an unlimited fine, or both. Oxycodone is a Schedule 2 drug under the Misuse of Drugs Regulations 2001 which "provide certain exemptions from the provisions of the Misuse of Drugs Act 1971".

==== United States ====
Under the Controlled Substances Act, oxycodone is a Schedule II controlled substance whether by itself or part of a multi-ingredient medication. The Drug Enforcement Administration (DEA) lists oxycodone both for sale and for use in manufacturing other opioids as ACSCN 9143 and in 2013 approved the following annual aggregate manufacturing quotas: 131.5 metric tons for sale, down from 153.75 in 2012, and 10.25 metric tons for conversion, unchanged from the previous year. In 2020, oxycodone possession was decriminalized in the U.S. state of Oregon.

=== Economics ===
The International Narcotics Control Board estimated 11.5 short tons (10.4 t) of oxycodone were manufactured worldwide in 1998; by 2007 this figure had grown to 75.2 short tons (68.2 t). United States accounted for 82% of consumption in 2007 at 51.6 short tons (46.8 t). Canada, Germany, Australia, and France combined accounted for 13% of consumption in 2007. In 2010, 1.3 short tons (1.2 t) of oxycodone were illegally manufactured using a fake pill imprint. This accounted for 0.8% of consumption. These illicit tablets were later seized by the U.S. Drug Enforcement Administration, according to the International Narcotics Control Board. The board also reported 122.5 short tons (111.1 t) manufactured in 2010. This number had decreased from a record high of 135.9 short tons (123.3 t) in 2009.

=== Names ===
Expanded expressions for the compound oxycodone in the academic literature include "dihydrohydroxycodeinone", "Eucodal", "Eukodal", "14-hydroxydihydrocodeinone", and "Nucodan". In a UNESCO convention, the translations of "oxycodone" are oxycodon (Dutch), oxycodone (French), oxicodona (Spanish), الأوكسيكودون (Arabic), 羟考酮 (Chinese), and оксикодон (Russian).

The word "oxycodone" should not be confused with "oxandrolone", "oxazepam", "oxybutynin", "oxytocin", or "Roxanol".

Other brand names include Oxeltra, Longtec and Shortec.
