= Martin Freund =

German chemist

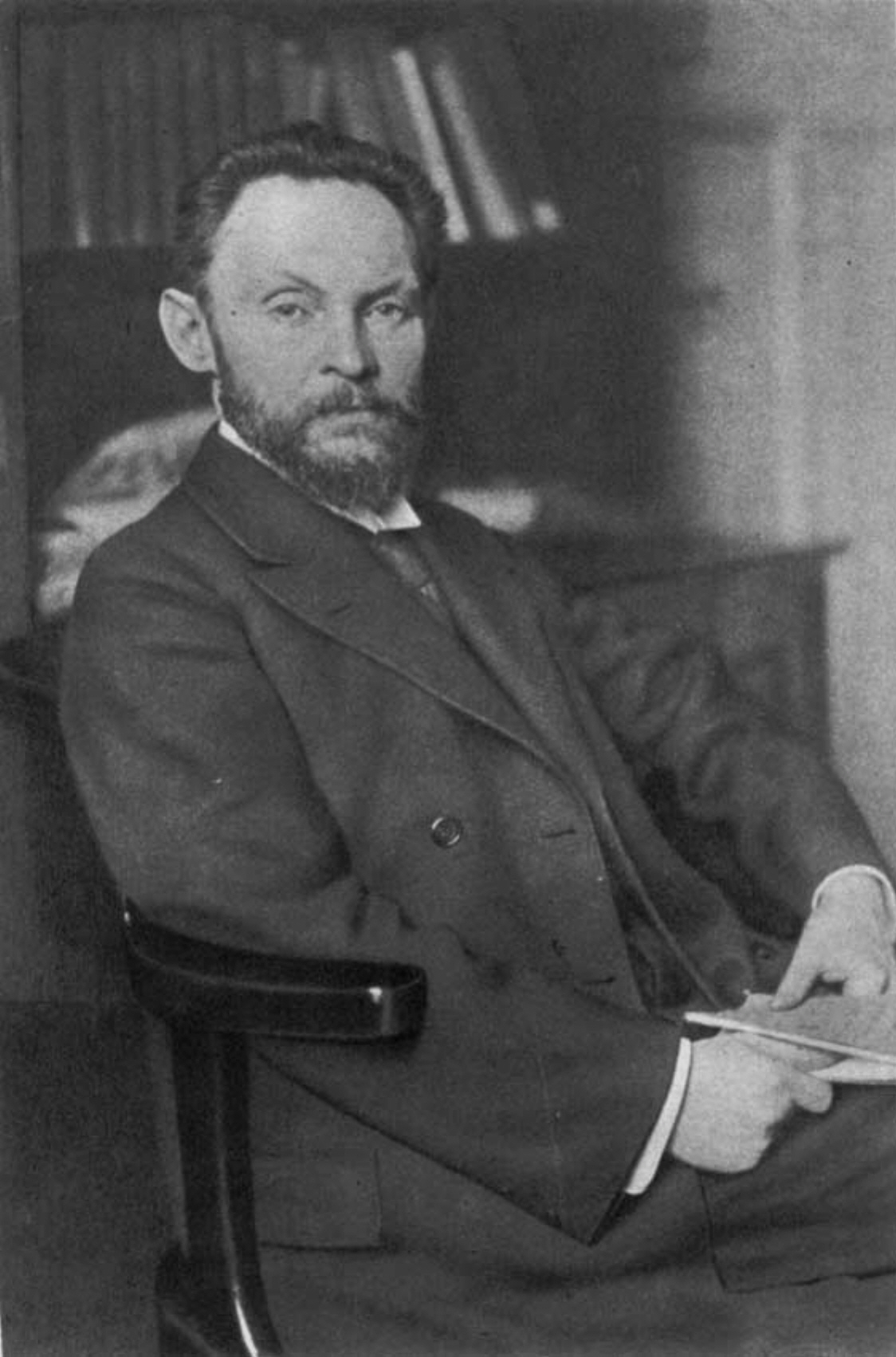
Martin Freund,1900

Martin Freund (August 13, 1863 in Neisse, Kingdom of Prussia – March 13, 1920 in Frankfurt am Main) was a German chemist and professor at the Goethe-Universität Frankfurt am Main.

== Life ==
Freund was born the son of a Jewish merchant. After graduating from the Realgymnasium at the Zwinger in Breslau, he started to study chemistry at the University of Breslau and the Humboldt University of Berlin in 1881. He received his doctorate in 1884. (contribution to the knowledge of malonic acid). During his studies he became a member of the Akademischer Naturwissenschaftlicher Verein zu Breslau in 1881. He was assistant to Hermann Wichelhaus and lecture assistant to August Wilhelm von Hofmann. In 1888 he habilitated in Berlin and in 1895 joined the Physikalischer Verein in Frankfurt am Main as a lecturer, where he headed its chemical laboratory. From 1905 he was a lecturer at the Akademie für Sozial- und Handelswissenschaften (Academy for Social and Commercial Sciences). In 1914 he became full professor of chemistry at the faculty of natural sciences of the newly founded University of Frankfurt and director of the chemical institute. Freund was a confidant of Fritz Haber, to whose wife he was related.

At the chemical institute he maintained close ties with industry (e.g. the companies Cassella, Degussa, Hoechst, Metallgesellschaft).

== Work ==
Freund dealt with alkaloids and clarified the composition of, for example, narcotine and contributed to the clarification of the composition of codeine and morphine. In 1910, he found a method of synthesising polycarboxylic acids via a Friedel-Crafts reaction of malonic acid derivatives with aromatic Hydrocarbons. With Edmund Speyer, he first synthesised the opioid oxycodone, which was subsequently marketed as the analgesic Eukodal by Merck.

== Miscellaneous ==
The Letter acids (1-naphtylamine-3,5-disulfonic acid), a coupling component of dye chemistry, is incorrectly assigned to Martin Freund in the literature. However, the name goes back to a patent of Louis Freund (St. Ludwig, Upper Alsace) of 1883, it was transferred to BASF after registration.

== Literature ==
- Entry in Winfried Pötsch, Annelore Fischer, Wolfgang Müller: Lexikon bedeutender Chemiker, Harri Deutsch 1989
