= Edmund Speyer =

German chemist

Jakob Edmund Speyer (11 November 1878 – 5 May 1942) was a high-ranking German university lecturer and chemist of Jewish descent. He was persecuted during the Nazi era, losing his profession and his livelihood. He was deported to the Lodz ghetto, where he died in 1942.

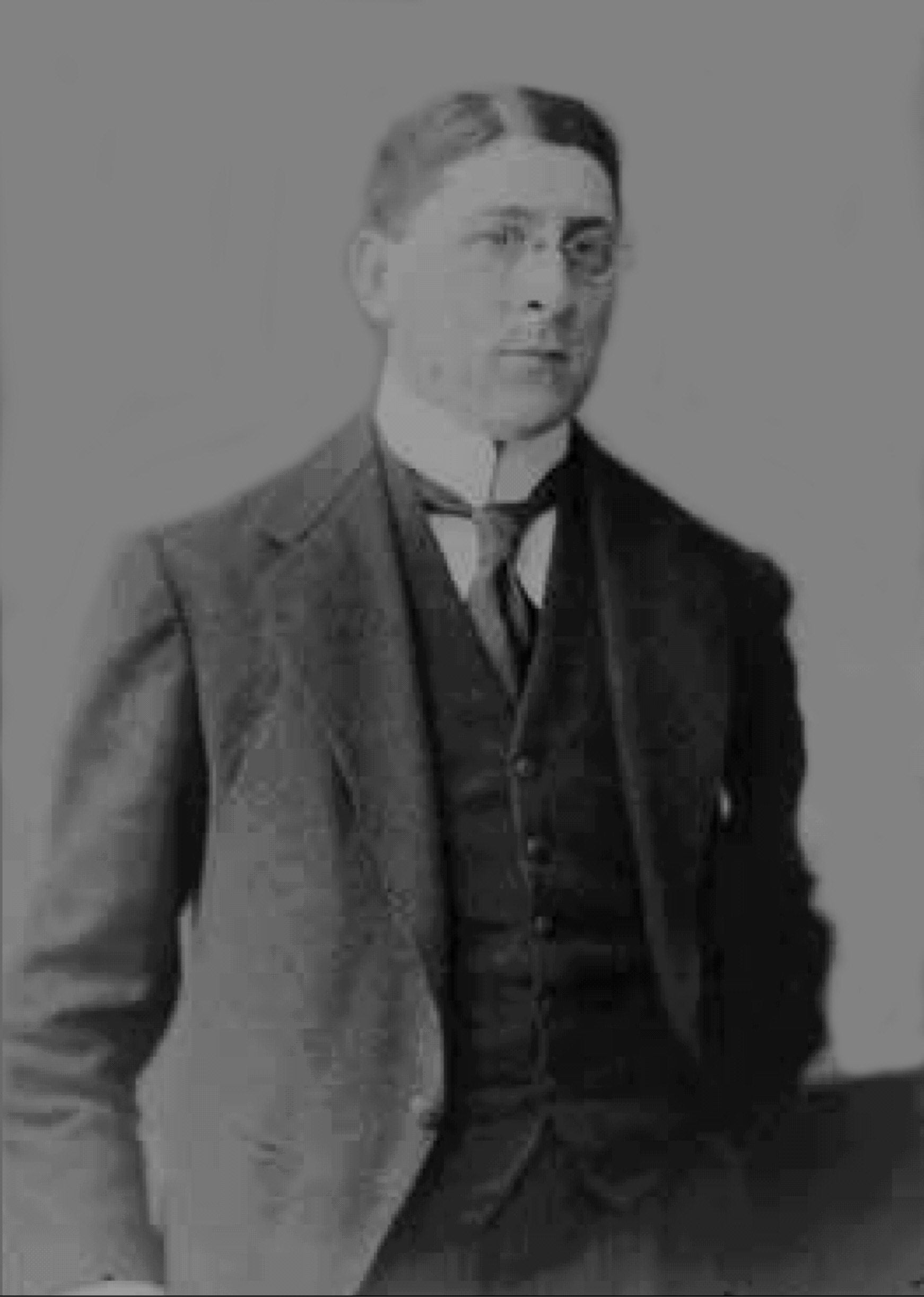
Jakob Edmund Speyer

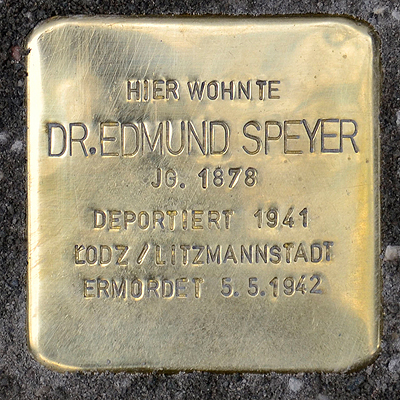

== Life ==
Speyer was born in Frankfurt am Main as the son of the Frankfurt merchant M. Speyer. After graduating from high school in Frankfurt in 1896, he began to study chemistry at Ruprecht-Karls-Universität Heidelberg. Here he was awarded a doctorate by Emil Knoevenagel in July 1901 with a thesis Zur Kenntnis der Additionsfähigkeit ungesättigter Verbindungen.

Speyer then went back to Frankfurt, where he first worked as a research assistant at the University of Frankfurt. In 1915 he received his habilitation with Contributions to the Knowledge of Thebaine and its Derivatives. With Martin Freund, who was head of the Chemical Institute at the Physikalischer Verein, he first synthesised the opioid oxycodone in 1916. Oxycodone was marketed in 1917 by Merck in Darmstadt under the brand name Eukodal as a painkiller and cough suppressant. Numerous patents and publications bear witness to the successful collaboration between Freund and Speyer between 1902 and 1920. He wrote the obituary for Martin Freund.

He then worked as an honorary lecturer and, from 1932, as extraordinary professor on research into alkaloids. A year later, after the Machtergreifung, his teaching licence was revoked because of his Jewish faith.

During the Second World War, Speyer was deported to the Łódź Ghetto. Situated 50 kilometres (31 mi) north of Łódź in the village of Chełmno, the Chełmno extermination camp began gassing operations on 8 December 1941. On 4 May 1942, the first transport with 1,000 of the "resettled" from Berlin, Cologne, Frankfurt, Prague, Paris, etc., who had previously had their rucksacks, bread bags and wedding rings taken from them in the police prison, left from the Radegast train station just outside the ghetto: This news had a depressing effect throughout the ghetto. Speyer died in Łódź from "heart failure" and "exhaustion" on 5 May 1942.

On the occasion of the 100th birthday of Goethe University, a Stolperstein was laid for him at Unterweg 22 on 17 October 2014.

== Selected publications ==
- Speyer, Edmund; Wieters, Hermann (1921). "Beitrag zur Kenntnis der Kodeinoxyd-sulfonsäuren und ihrer Derivate". Berichte der Deutschen Chemischen Gesellschaft (A and B Series) (in German). 54 (11): 2976–2987. doi:10.1002/cber.19210541106.
- Speyer, Edmund; Becker, Alfred Gustav (1922). "Über die Einwirkung von Wasserstoffsuperoxyd auf China-Alkaloide". Berichte der Deutschen Chemischen Gesellschaft (A and B Series) (in German). 55 (5): 1321–1329. doi:10.1002/cber.19220550523.
- Speyer, Edmund; Becker, Günther (1922). "Zur Kenntnis des Morphins". Berichte der Deutschen Chemischen Gesellschaft (A and B Series) (in German). 55 (5): 1329–1339. doi:10.1002/cber.19220550524.
- Speyer, Edmund; Koulen, Karl (1931). "Über die Einwirkung von Ozon auf des - N -Methyl-dihydro-kodein (I. Mitteil.)". Berichte der Deutschen Chemischen Gesellschaft (A and B Series) (in German). 64 (11): 2815–2819. doi:10.1002/cber.19310641110.
