= Hydromorphinol =

Opioid analgesic drug

Clinical data
- Trade names: Numorphan
- Other names: Hydromorphinol, 14-hydroxy-7,8-dihydromorphine, RAM-320
- ATC code: none

Legal status
- Legal status: AU: S8 (Controlled drug); BR: Class A1 (Narcotic drugs); CA: Schedule I; DE: Anlage I (Authorized scientific use only); US: Schedule I

Identifiers
- IUPAC name: (5α,6α)-3,6,14-Trihydroxy-4,5-epoxy-17-methylmorphinan
- CAS Number: 2183-56-4 2190-27-4
- PubChem CID: 5463858
- DrugBank: DB01512
- ChemSpider: 4576407
- UNII: 1O00P9X5C1
- KEGG: D12686
- ChEMBL: ChEMBL1951706
- CompTox Dashboard (EPA): DTXSID30176242
- ECHA InfoCard: 100.016.878

Chemical and physical data
- Formula: C_{17}H_{21}NO_{4}
- Molar mass: 303.358 g·mol^{−1}
- 3D model (JSmol): Interactive image
- SMILES: CN1CC[C@]23[C@@H]4[C@H](CC[C@]2([C@H]1CC5=C3C(=C(C=C5)O)O4)O)O
- InChI: InChI=1S/C17H21NO4/c1-18-7-6-16-13-9-2-3-10(19)14(13)22-15(16)11(20)4-5-17(16,21)12(18)8-9/h2-3,11-12,15,19-21H,4-8H2,1H3/t11-,12+,15-,16-,17+/m0/s1; Key:AABLHGPVOULICI-BRJGLHKUSA-N

Hydromorphinol (RAM-320, 14-hydroxydihydromorphine), is an opiate analogue that is a derivative of morphine, where the 14-position has been hydroxylated and the 7,8- double bond saturated. It has similar effects to morphine such as sedation, analgesia and respiratory depression, but is twice as potent as morphine and has a steeper dose-response curve and longer half-life. It is used in medicine as the bitartrate salt (free base conversion ratio 0.643, molecular weight 471.5) and hydrochloride (free base conversion ratio 0.770, molecular weight 393.9)

Hydromorphinol has also been discovered to occur naturally in trace amounts within opium, although this is a very rare occurrence.

It is also called α-oxymorphol, and oxymorphol is itself a mixture of hydromorphinol and 4,5α-epoxy-17-methylmorphinan-3,6β,14-triol (β-oxymorphol) which is different at position 6 on the morphine carbon skeleton.

Hydromorphinol was developed in Austria in 1932. In the United States, it was never available and is classified as a Schedule I drug with a DEA ACSCN of 9301. The salts in use are the bitartrate (free base conversion ratio 0.643) and hydrochloride (0.770). The 2014, national aggregate manufacturing quota was 2 grams, unchanged from prior years.

Hydromorphinol is metabolized mainly in the liver in the same fashion as many other opioids and is itself a minor active metabolite of 14-hydroxydihydrocodeine, an uncommonly used opiate (but is therefore also an active metabolite of a first-order active metabolite of oxycodone).

It is distributed under the trade name Numorphan in some countries. It is controlled under the Single Convention On Narcotic Drugs.

== See also ==
- Oxymorphol
- N-Phenethylhydromorphinol (RAM-378)
