= Hydrocodone =

Opioid drug used in pain relief

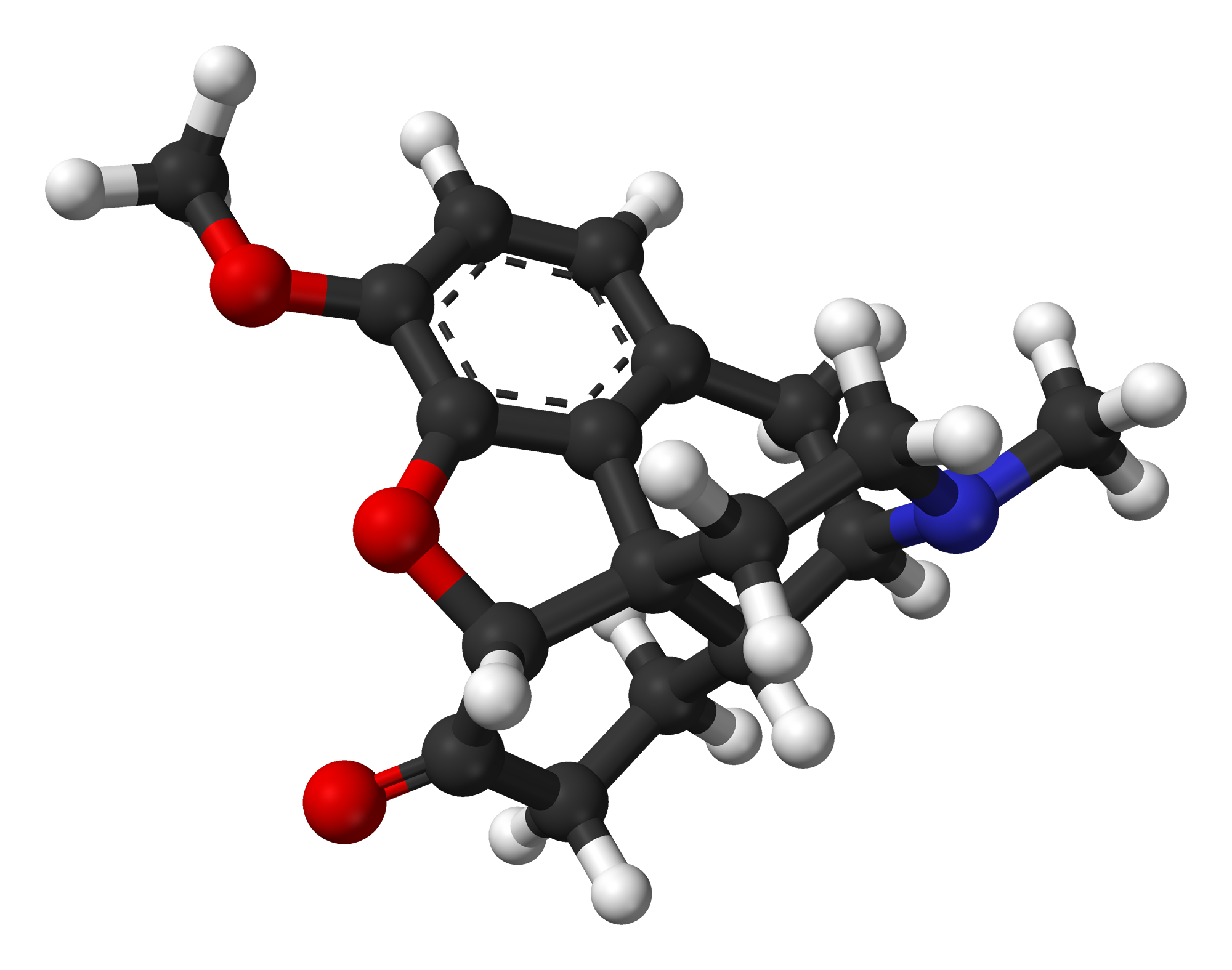

Clinical data
- Trade names: Hysingla ER, Zohydro ER
- Other names: Dihydrocodeinone, hydrocodone bitartrate
- AHFS/Drugs.com: Monograph
- MedlinePlus: a601006
- License data: US DailyMed: Hydrocodone
- Dependence liability: High
- Addiction liability: High
- Routes of administration: Clinical: By mouth Others: Intranasal, rectal
- Drug class: Opioid
- ATC code: R05DA03 (WHO)

Legal status
- Legal status: AU: S8 (Controlled drug); BR: Class A1 (Narcotic drugs); CA: Schedule I; DE: Anlage III (Special prescription form required); NZ: Class B; UK: Class A; US: Schedule II; SE: Förteckning I

Pharmacokinetic data
- Bioavailability: Oral: 70%
- Protein binding: Low
- Metabolism: Liver: CYP3A4 (major), CYP2D6 (minor)
- Metabolites: Norhydrocodone; Hydromorphone; Others
- Onset of action: 10–20 minutes
- Elimination half-life: Average: 3.8 hours Range: 3.3–4.4 hours
- Duration of action: 4–8 hours
- Excretion: Urine

Identifiers
- IUPAC name: 4,5α-epoxy-3-methoxy-17-methylmorphinan-6-one
- CAS Number: 125-29-1
- PubChem CID: 5284569
- IUPHAR/BPS: 7081
- DrugBank: DB00956
- ChemSpider: 4447623
- UNII: 6YKS4Y3WQ7
- KEGG: D08045
- ChEBI: CHEBI:5779
- ChEMBL: ChEMBL1457
- CompTox Dashboard (EPA): DTXSID8023131
- ECHA InfoCard: 100.004.304

Chemical and physical data
- Formula: C_{18}H_{21}NO_{3}
- Molar mass: 299.370 g·mol^{−1}
- 3D model (JSmol): Interactive image
- SMILES: O=C4[C@@H]5Oc1c2c(ccc1OC)C[C@H]3N(CC[C@]25[C@H]3CC4)C
- InChI: InChI=1S/C18H21NO3/c1-19-8-7-18-11-4-5-13(20)17(18)22-16-14(21-2)6-3-10(15(16)18)9-12(11)19/h3,6,11-12,17H,4-5,7-9H2,1-2H3/t11-,12+,17-,18-/m0/s1; Key:LLPOLZWFYMWNKH-CMKMFDCUSA-N

Hydrocodone, also known as dihydrocodeinone, is a semi-synthetic opioid used to treat pain and as a cough suppressant. It is taken by mouth. Typically, it is dispensed as the combination acetaminophen/hydrocodone or ibuprofen/hydrocodone for pain severe enough to require an opioid and in combination with homatropine methylbromide to relieve cough. It is also available by itself in a long-acting form sold under the brand name Zohydro ER, among others, to treat severe pain of a prolonged duration. Hydrocodone is a controlled drug: in the United States, it is classified as a Schedule II Controlled Substance.

Common side effects include dizziness, sleepiness, nausea, and constipation. Serious side effects may include low blood pressure, seizures, QT prolongation, respiratory depression, and serotonin syndrome. Rapidly decreasing the dose may result in opioid withdrawal. Use during pregnancy or breastfeeding is generally not recommended. Hydrocodone is believed to work by activating opioid receptors, mainly in the brain and spinal cord. Hydrocodone 10 mg is equivalent to about 10 mg of morphine by mouth.

Hydrocodone was patented in 1923, while the long-acting formulation was approved for medical use in the United States in 2013. It is most commonly prescribed in the United States, which consumed 99% of the worldwide supply as of 2010. In 2018, it was the 402nd most commonly prescribed medication in the United States, with more than 400,000 prescriptions. Hydrocodone is a semi-synthetic opioid, converted from codeine or less often from thebaine. Production using genetically engineered yeasts has been developed but is not used commercially.

== Medical uses ==
Hydrocodone is used to treat moderate to severe pain. In liquid formulations, it is used to treat coughing. In one study comparing the potency of hydrocodone to that of oxycodone, it was found that it took 50% more hydrocodone to achieve the same degree of miosis (pupillary contraction). The investigators interpreted this to mean that oxycodone is about 50% more potent than hydrocodone.

However, in a study of emergency department patients with fractures, it was found that an equal amount of either drug provided about the same degree of pain relief, indicating that there is little practical difference between them when used for that purpose. Some references state that the analgesic action of hydrocodone begins in 20–30 minutes and lasts about 4–8 hours. The manufacturer's information says onset of action is about 10–30 minutes and duration is about 4–6 hours. Recommended dosing interval is 4–6 hours. Hydrocodone reaches peak serum levels after 1.3 hours.

=== Available forms ===
Hydrocodone is available in a variety of formulations for oral administration:

- The original oral form of hydrocodone alone, Dicodid, as immediate-release 5- and 10-mg tablets is available for prescription in Continental Europe per national drug control and prescription laws and Title 76 of the Schengen Treaty, but dihydrocodeine has been more widely used for the same indications since the beginning in the early 1920s, with hydrocodone being regulated the same way as morphine in the German Betäubungsmittelgesetz, the similarly named law in Switzerland and the Austrian Suchtmittelgesetz, whereas dihydrocodeine is regulated like codeine. For a number of decades, the liquid hydrocodone products available have been cough medicines.
- Hydrocodone plus homatropine (Hycodan) in the form of small tablets for coughing and especially neuropathic moderate pain (the homatropine, an anticholinergic, is useful in both of those cases and is a deterrent to intentional overdose) was more widely used than Dicodid and was labelled as a cough medicine in the United States whilst Vicodin and similar drugs were the choices for analgesia.
- Extended-release hydrocodone in a time-release syrup also containing chlorphenamine/chlorpheniramine is a cough medicine called Tussionex in North America. In Europe, similar time-release syrups containing codeine (numerous), dihydrocodeine (Paracodin Retard Hustensaft), nicocodeine (Tusscodin), thebacon, acetyldihydrocodeine, dionine, and nicodicodeine are used instead.
- Immediate-release hydrocodone with paracetamol (acetaminophen) (Vicodin, Lortab, Lorcet, Maxidone, Norco, Zydone)
- Immediate-release hydrocodone with ibuprofen (Vicoprofen, Ibudone, Reprexain)
- Immediate-release hydrocodone with aspirin (Alor 5/500, Azdone, Damason-P, Lortab ASA, Panasal 5/500)
- Controlled-release hydrocodone (Hysingla ER by Purdue Pharma, Zohydro ER)

Hydrocodone is not available in parenteral or any other non-oral forms.

== Side effects ==
Main symptoms of Hydrocodone overdose

Common side effects of hydrocodone are nausea, vomiting, constipation, drowsiness, dizziness, lightheadedness, anxiety, abnormally happy or sad mood, dry throat, difficulty urinating, rash, itching, and contraction of the pupils. Serious side effects include slowed or irregular breathing and chest tightness.

Several cases of progressive bilateral hearing loss unresponsive to steroid therapy have been described as an infrequent adverse reaction to hydrocodone/paracetamol misuse. This adverse effect has been considered by some to be due to the ototoxicity of hydrocodone. Other researchers have suggested that paracetamol is the primary agent responsible for the ototoxicity.

The U.S. Food and Drug Administration (FDA) assigns the drug to pregnancy category C, meaning that no adequate and well-controlled studies in humans have been conducted. A newborn of a mother taking opioid medications regularly prior to the birth will be physically dependent. The baby may also exhibit respiratory depression if the opioid dose was high. An epidemiological study indicated that opioid treatment during early pregnancy results in increased risk of various birth defects.

Symptoms of hydrocodone overdose include narrowed or widened pupils; slow, shallow, or stopped breathing; slowed or stopped heartbeat; cold, clammy, or blue skin; excessive sleepiness; loss of consciousness; seizures; or death.

Hydrocodone can be habit forming, causing physical and psychological dependence. Its abuse liability is similar to morphine and less than oxycodone.

== Interactions ==
Hydrocodone is metabolized by the cytochrome P450 enzymes CYP2D6 and CYP3A4, and inhibitors and inducers of these enzymes can modify hydrocodone exposure. One study found that combination of paroxetine, a selective serotonin reuptake inhibitor (SSRI) and strong CYP2D6 inhibitor, with once-daily extended-release hydrocodone, did not modify exposure to hydrocodone or the incidence of adverse effects. These findings suggest that hydrocodone can be coadministered with CYP2D6 inhibitors without dosage modification. Conversely, combination of hydrocodone/acetaminophen with the antiviral regimen of ombitasvir, paritaprevir, ritonavir, and dasabuvir for treatment of hepatitis C increased peak concentrations of hydrocodone by 27%, total exposure by 90%, and elimination half-life from 5.1 hours to 8.0 hours. Ritonavir is a strong CYP3A4 inhibitor as well as inducer of CYP3A and other enzymes, and the other antivirals are known to inhibit drug transporters like organic anion transporting polypeptide (OATP) 1B1 and 1B3, P-glycoprotein, and breast cancer resistance protein (BCRP). The changes in hydrocodone levels are consistent with CYP3A4 inhibition by ritonavir. Based on these findings, a 50% lower dose of hydrocodone and closer clinical monitoring was recommended when hydrocodone is used in combination with this antiviral regimen.

People consuming alcohol, other opioids, anticholinergic antihistamines, antipsychotics, anxiolytics, or other central nervous system (CNS) depressants together with hydrocodone may exhibit an additive CNS depression. Hydrocodone taken concomitantly with serotonergic medications like SSRI antidepressants may increase the risk of serotonin syndrome.

== Pharmacology ==
=== Pharmacodynamics ===
Hydrocodone (and metabolite) at opioid receptors
Compound	Affinities (K_{i})			Ratio	Ref
Compound	MOR	DOR	KOR	MOR:DOR:KOR	Ref
Hydrocodone	11.1 nM	962 nM	501 nM	1:87:45	
Hydromorphone	0.47 nM	18.5 nM	24.9 nM	1:39:53	

Equivalent analgesia doses
Compound	Route	Dose
Codeine	PO	200 mg
Hydrocodone	PO	30 mg
Hydromorphone	PO	7.5 mg
Hydromorphone	IV	1.5 mg
Morphine	PO	30 mg
Morphine	IV	10 mg
Oxycodone	PO	20 mg
Oxycodone	IV	10 mg
Oxymorphone	PO	10 mg
Oxymorphone	IV	1 mg

Hydrocodone is a highly selective full agonist of the μ-opioid receptor (MOR). This is the main biological target of the endogenous opioid neuropeptide β-endorphin. Hydrocodone has low affinity for the δ-opioid receptor (DOR) and the κ-opioid receptor (KOR), where it is an agonist similarly.

Studies have shown hydrocodone is stronger than codeine but only one-tenth as potent as morphine at binding to receptors and reported to be only 59% as potent as morphine in analgesic properties. However, in tests conducted on rhesus monkeys, the analgesic potency of hydrocodone was actually higher than morphine. Oral hydrocodone has a mean equivalent daily dosage (MEDD) factor of 0.4, meaning that 1 mg of hydrocodone is equivalent to 0.4 mg of intravenous morphine. However, because of morphine's low oral bioavailability, there is a 1:1 correspondence between orally administered morphine and orally administered hydrocodone.

=== Pharmacokinetics ===
==== Absorption ====
Hydrocodone is only pharmaceutically available as an oral medication. It is well-absorbed, but the oral bioavailability of hydrocodone is only approximately 25%. The onset of action of hydrocodone via this route is 10 to 20 minutes, with a peak effect (T_{max}) occurring at 30 to 60 minutes, and it has a duration of 4 to 8 hours. The FDA label for immediate-release hydrocodone with acetaminophen does not include any information on the influence of food on its absorption or other pharmacokinetics. Conversely, coadministration with a high-fat meal increases peak concentrations of different formulations of extended-release hydrocodone by 14 to 54%, whereas area-under-the-curve levels are not notably affected.

==== Distribution ====
The volume of distribution of hydrocodone is 3.3 to 4.7 L/kg. The plasma protein binding of hydrocodone is 20 to 50%.

==== Metabolism ====
In the liver, hydrocodone is transformed into several metabolites, including norhydrocodone, hydromorphone, 6α-hydrocodol (dihydrocodeine), and 6β-hydrocodol. 6α- and 6β-hydromorphol are also formed, and the metabolites of hydrocodone are conjugated (via glucuronidation). Hydrocodone has a terminal half-life that averages 3.8 hours (range 3.3–4.4 hours). The hepatic cytochrome P450 enzyme CYP2D6 converts hydrocodone into hydromorphone, a more potent opioid (5-fold higher binding affinity to the MOR). However, extensive and poor cytochrome 450 CYP2D6 metabolizers had similar physiological and subjective responses to hydrocodone, and CYP2D6 inhibitor quinidine did not change the responses of extensive metabolizers, suggesting that inhibition of CYP2D6 metabolism of hydrocodone has no practical importance. Ultra-rapid CYP2D6 metabolizers (1–2% of the population) may have an increased response to hydrocodone; however, hydrocodone metabolism in this population has not been studied.

Norhydrocodone, the major metabolite of hydrocodone, is predominantly formed by CYP3A4-catalyzed oxidation. In contrast to hydromorphone, it is described as inactive. However, norhydrocodone is actually a MOR agonist with similar potency to hydrocodone, but has been found to produce only minimal analgesia when administered peripherally to animals (likely due to poor blood–brain barrier and thus central nervous system penetration). Inhibition of CYP3A4 in a child who was, in addition, a poor CYP2D6 metabolizer, resulted in a fatal overdose of hydrocodone. Approximately 40% of hydrocodone metabolism is attributed to non-cytochrome P450-catalyzed reactions.

==== Elimination ====
Hydrocodone is excreted in urine, mainly in the form of conjugates.

== Chemistry ==
=== Detection in body fluids ===
Hydrocodone concentrations are measured in blood, plasma, and urine to seek evidence of misuse, to confirm diagnoses of poisoning, and to assist in investigations into deaths. Many commercial opiate screening tests react indiscriminately with hydrocodone, other opiates, and their metabolites, but chromatographic techniques can easily distinguish hydrocodone uniquely. Blood and plasma hydrocodone concentrations typically fall into the 5–30 μg/L range among people taking the drug therapeutically, 100–200 μg/L among recreational users, and 100–1,600 μg/L in cases of acute, fatal overdosage. Co-administration of the drug with food or alcohol can very significantly increase the resulting plasma hydrocodone concentrations that are subsequently achieved.

=== Synthesis ===
Hydrocodone is most commonly synthesized from thebaine, a constituent of opium latex from the dried poppy plant. Once thebaine is obtained, the reaction undergoes hydrogenation using a palladium catalyst.

=== Structure ===
There are three important structures in hydrocodone: the amine group, which binds to the tertiary nitrogen binding site in the central nervous system's opioid receptor, the hydroxy group that binds to the anionic binding site, and the phenyl group which binds to the phenolic binding site. This triggers a G protein activation and subsequent release of dopamine.

== History ==
Hydrocodone was first synthesized in Germany in 1920 by Carl Mannich and Helene Löwenheim. It was approved by the Food and Drug Administration on 23 March 1943 for sale in the United States and approved by Health Canada for sale in Canada under the brand name Hycodan.

Hydrocodone was first marketed by Knoll as Dicodid, starting in February 1924 in Germany. This name is analogous to other products the company introduced or otherwise marketed: Dilaudid (hydromorphone, 1926), Dinarkon (oxycodone, 1917), Dihydrin (dihydrocodeine, 1911), and Dimorphan (dihydromorphine). Paramorfan is the trade name of dihydromorphine from another manufacturer, as is Paracodin, for dihydrocodeine.

Hydrocodone was patented in 1923, while the long-acting formulation was approved for medical use in the United States in 2013. It is most commonly prescribed in the United States, which consumed 99% of the worldwide supply as of 2010. In 2018, it was the 402nd most commonly prescribed medication in the United States, with more than 400,000 prescriptions.

== Society and culture ==
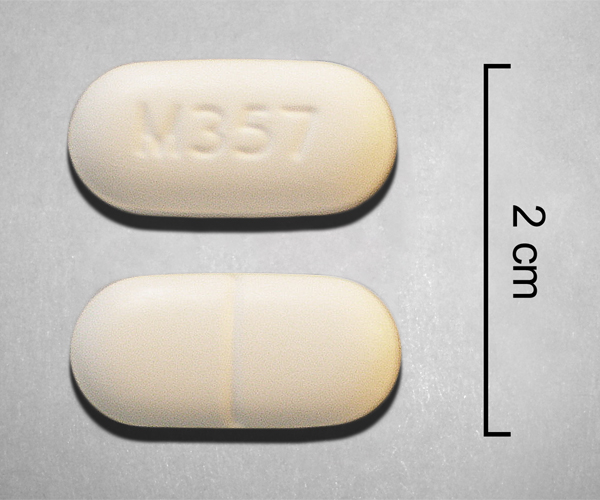
Hydrocodone and paracetamol (acetaminophen) 10-325 tablets (Mallinckrodt)

=== Formulations ===
Several common imprints for hydrocodone are M365, M366, M367.

==== Combination products ====
Most hydrocodone formulations include a second analgesic, such as paracetamol (acetaminophen) or ibuprofen. Examples of hydrocodone combinations include Norco, Vicodin, Vicoprofen and Riboxen.

=== Legal status in the United States ===
The US government imposed tougher prescribing rules for hydrocodone in 2014, changing the drug from Schedule III to Schedule II. In 2011, hydrocodone products were involved in around 100,000 abuse-related emergency department visits in the United States, more than double the number in 2004.

== Veterinary use ==
Hydrocodone is predominantly used as an antitussive in dogs. Hydrocodone has low oral bioavailability and provide poor analgesia in cats and dogs. One study in dogs found hydrocodone to be less effective than firocoxib for dogs undergoing a tibial-plateau-levelling osteotomy.
