= Oxymorphone =

Opioid analgesic drug

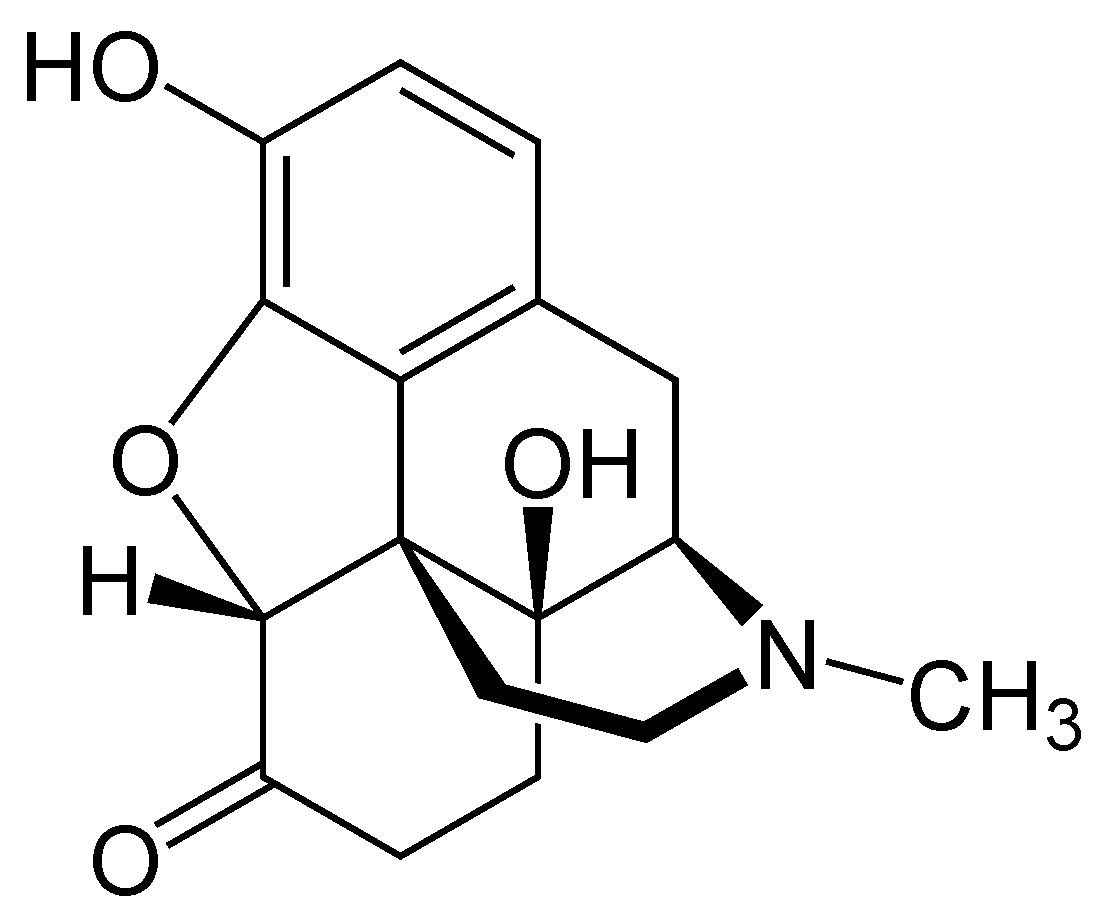
- Molecular structure of oxymorphone

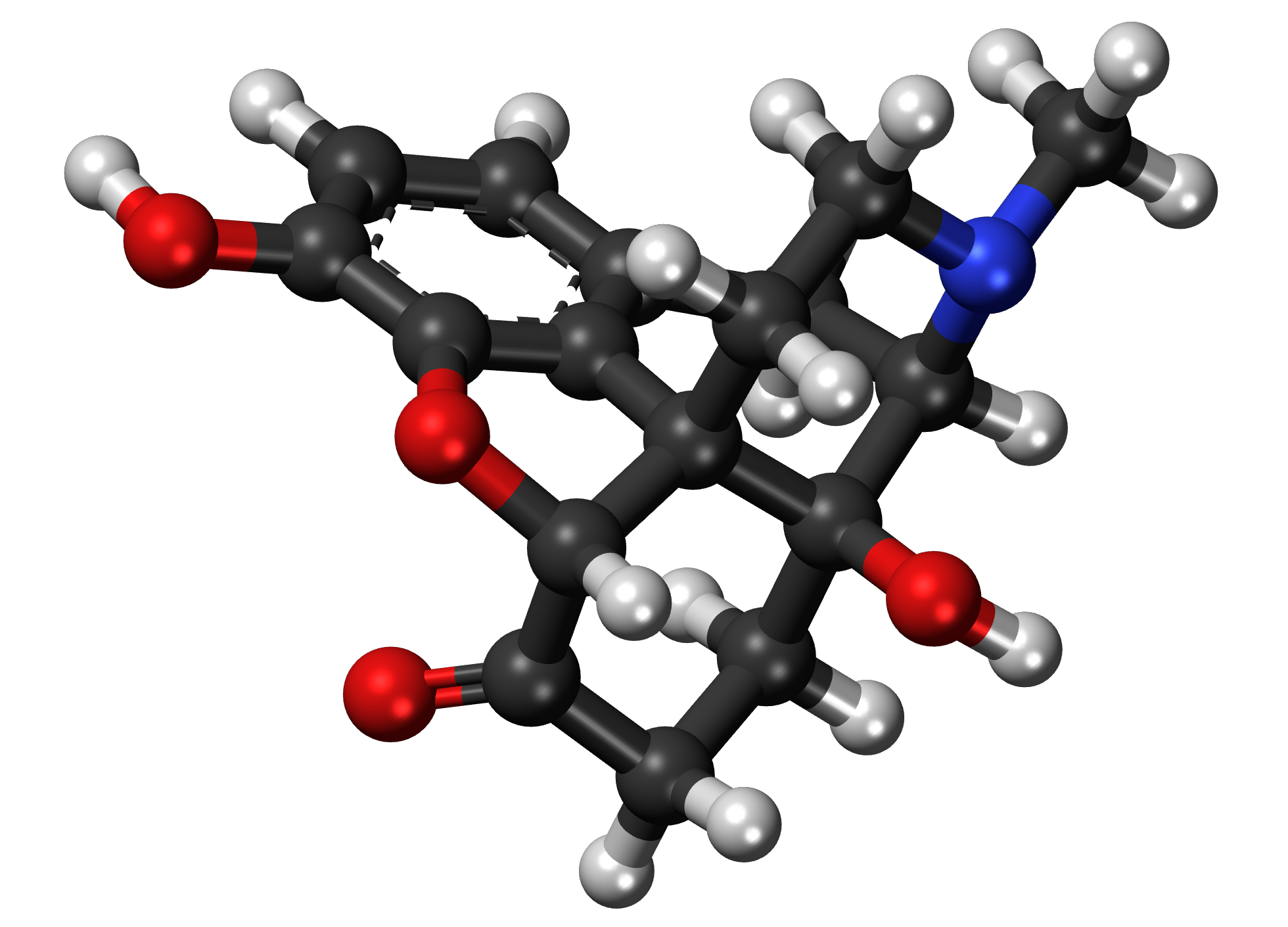
- 3D representation of an oxymorphone molecule

Clinical data
- Trade names: Numorphan, Numorphone, Opana, others
- Other names: 14-Hydroxydihydromorphinone
- AHFS/Drugs.com: Monograph
- MedlinePlus: a610022
- License data: US DailyMed: Oxymorphone
- Dependence liability: High
- Addiction liability: High
- Routes of administration: By mouth, buccal, sublingual, intranasal, intravenous, epidural, subcutaneous, intramuscular
- Drug class: Opioid
- ATC code: N02AA11 (WHO)

Legal status
- Legal status: AU: S8 (Controlled drug); BR: Class A1 (Narcotic drugs); CA: Schedule I; DE: Anlage II (Authorized trade only, not prescriptible); UK: Class A; US: Schedule II; SE: Förteckning II In general: ℞ (Prescription only)

Pharmacokinetic data
- Bioavailability: By mouth: 10% Buccal: 28% Sublingual: 37.5% Intranasal: 43% IV/IM/IT: 100%
- Protein binding: 10%
- Metabolism: Liver (CYP3A4, glucuronidation)
- Metabolites: • Noroxymorphone • glucuronide
- Elimination half-life: 10–12 hours
- Duration of action: By mouth: 6–8 hours Parenteral: 4–6 hours
- Excretion: Urine, feces

Identifiers
- IUPAC name: 4,5α-Epoxy-3,14-dihydroxy-17-methylmorphinan-6-one
- CAS Number: 76-41-5
- PubChem CID: 5284604
- IUPHAR/BPS: 7094
- DrugBank: DB01192
- ChemSpider: 4447650
- UNII: 9VXA968E0C
- KEGG: D08323
- ChEMBL: ChEMBL963
- CompTox Dashboard (EPA): DTXSID5023409
- ECHA InfoCard: 100.000.873

Chemical and physical data
- Formula: C_{17}H_{19}NO_{4}
- Molar mass: 301.342 g·mol^{−1}
- 3D model (JSmol): Interactive image
- SMILES: CN1CC[C@]23c4c5ccc(O)c4O[C@H]2C(=O)CC[C@@]3(O)[C@H]1C5
- InChI: InChI=1S/C17H19NO4/c1-18-7-6-16-13-9-2-3-10(19)14(13)22-15(16)11(20)4-5-17(16,21)12(18)8-9/h2-3,12,15,19,21H,4-8H2,1H3/t12-,15+,16+,17-/m1/s1; Key:UQCNKQCJZOAFTQ-ISWURRPUSA-N

Oxymorphone, sold under the brand names Numorphan and Opana among others, is a highly potent opioid analgesic indicated for treatment of severe pain. Pain relief after injection begins after about 5–10 minutes; after oral administration it begins after about 30 minutes and lasts about 3–4 hours for immediate-release tablets and 12 hours for extended-release tablets. The elimination half-life of oxymorphone is much faster intravenously, and as such, the drug is most commonly used orally. Like oxycodone, which metabolizes to oxymorphone, oxymorphone has a high abuse potential.

Oxymorphone was developed in Germany in 1914. It was patented in 1955 and approved for medical use in 1959. In June 2017 the FDA asked Endo Pharmaceuticals to remove its product from the US market. This was in part due to the opioid epidemic in the US, and the fact that a 2012 reformulation failed to stop illicit injection of the drug. Endo responded by voluntarily removing Opana ER from the market a month later. Generic versions of extended-release oxymorphone, such as those manufactured by Amneal Pharmaceuticals, are still available in the US.

== Medical uses ==
Oxymorphone is indicated for the relief of moderate to severe pain, such as treatment of acute post-surgical pain. For any chronic treatment of pain, clinicians should only consider long term use if there is significant clinical benefit to the patient's therapy that outweigh any potential risk. The first line treatment choices for chronic pain are non-pharmacological and non-opioid agents.

Oxymorphone extended-release tablets are indicated for the management of chronic pain and only for people already on a regular schedule of strong opioids for a prolonged period. Immediate-release oxymorphone tablets are recommended for breakthrough pain for people on the extended-release version. Compared to other opioids, oxymorphone has similar pain relieving efficacy.

In the United States it is a Schedule II controlled substance with an ACSCN of 9652.

=== Availability ===
==== Brands and forms ====
Oxymorphone was marketed by Endo Pharmaceuticals, under the brand name(s) Opana and Opana ER. Opana ER was withdrawn by the manufacturer in 2017 due to an FDA request, making it unavailable in the US. However, both IR (immediate release) and ER (extended release) formulations are still available under the generic names Oxymorphone and Oxymorphone ER and available from a multitude of manufacturers.

Oxymorphone is also available as an injectable for inpatient use, available for IV (intravenous), IM (intramuscular), and SC (subcutaneous) injection.

An extended release (ER) modified-release dosage form is commonly used, which modifies the pharmacokinetics of the drug.

==== Oral dosage forms ====
Oxymorphone comes in a variety of doses.

IR Tablet	ER 12 Hour Tablet
5 mg	5 mg
10 mg	7.5 mg
	10 mg
	15 mg
	20 mg
	30 mg
	40 mg

=== Special populations ===
Patients already suffering from debilitation are at a much higher risk of respiratory depression. Non-opioid analgesics should be considered in this population.

Elderly patients are much more sensitive to adverse effects such as falls, cognitive impairment and constipation, and should be monitored for such. Decreased renal function associated with aging leads to decreased clearance of the drug, resulting in narrow therapeutic windows and increasing the danger of overdose. If oxymorphone is absolutely indicated, smaller initial doses should be started for this population.

There is a risk of neonatal withdrawal symptom in the newborn if pregnant women take oxymorphone for a prolonged period. Oxymorphone crosses the placenta and holds risk of birth defects, poor fetal growth, stillbirth, and preterm delivery. The children of mothers who are physically dependent on oxymorphone have a higher risk of similar dependence. Due to these severe risks, oxymorphone is highly discouraged among this population. The amount of transfer of oxymorphone into the breast milk is not known and women are cautioned to weigh the risks and benefits before breastfeeding while on this medication.

== Side effects ==
The principal adverse effects of oxymorphone are similar to other opioids with constipation, nausea, vomiting, dizziness, dry mouth and drowsiness being the most common adverse effects. This drug is highly addictive as with other opioids and can lead to chemical dependence and withdrawal.

== Overdose ==
In common with other opioids, oxymorphone overdosage is characterized by respiratory depression, sleepiness progressing to stupor or coma, skeletal muscle weakness, cold and clammy skin, and sometimes slow heart rate and low blood pressure. In a severe case of overdose, apnea, circulatory collapse, cardiac arrest and death can occur.

== Pharmacology ==
=== Pharmacodynamics ===
Oxymorphone elicits its effects by binding to and activating the μ-opioid receptor (MOR) and, to a much lesser extent, the δ-opioid receptor (DOR) and κ-opioid receptor (KOR). Its activity at the DOR may augment its action at the MOR. Oxymorphone is 10 times more potent than morphine.

1.02 mg of oxymorphone hydrochloride produces analgesia roughly equivalent to 10 mg of morphine sulfate, with similar peak and duration of effect but potentially slightly fewer side effects at equipotent doses.

Oxymorphone at opioid receptors
Affinities (K_{i})			Ratio
MOR	DOR	KOR	MOR:DOR:KOR
0.78 nM	50 nM	137 nM	1:64:176

Equianalgesic doses
Compound	Route	Dose
Codeine	PO	200 mg
Hydrocodone	PO	20–30 mg
Hydromorphone	PO	7.5 mg
Hydromorphone	IV	1.5 mg
Morphine	PO	30 mg
Oxycodone	IV	20 mg
Morphine	IV	10 mg
Oxycodone	PO	20 mg
Oxymorphone	PO	7–10 mg
Oxymorphone	IV	1 mg

== Chemistry ==
Oxymorphone is commercially produced from thebaine, which is a minor constituent of the opium poppy (Papaver somniferum) but thebaine is found in greater abundance (3%) in the roots of the oriental poppy (Papaver orientale). German patents from the mid-1930s indicate that oxymorphone as well as hydromorphone, hydrocodone, oxycodone, and acetylmorphone can be prepared—without the need for hydrogen gas—from solutions of codeine, morphine, and dionine by refluxing an acidic aqueous solution, or the precursor drug dissolved in ethanol, in the presence of certain metals, namely palladium and platinum in fine powder or colloidal form or platinum black.

Oxymorphone hydrochloride occurs as odourless white crystals or white to off-white powder. It darkens in colour with prolonged exposure to light. One gram of oxymorphone hydrochloride is soluble in 4 ml of water and it is sparingly soluble in alcohol and ether. It degrades upon contact with light.

Oxymorphone can be acetylated like morphine, hydromorphone, and some other opioids. Mono-, di-, tri-, and tetra- esters of oxymorphone were developed in the 1930s but are not used in medicine at this time. Presumably other esters such as nicotinyl, benzoyl, formyl, or cinnamyl can be produced.

The 2013 US DEA annual manufacturing quotas were 18 375 kilogrammes for conversion (a number of drugs can be made from oxymorphone, both painkillers and opioid antagonists like naloxone) and 6875 kg for direct manufacture of end-products. Oxymorphone is also a minor metabolite of oxycodone, which is formed by CYP2D6-mediated O-demethylation.

== History ==
Oxymorphone was first developed in Germany in 1914, and patented in the US by Endo Pharmaceuticals in 1955. It was introduced in the United States in January 1959 and other countries around the same time.

== Society and culture ==
=== Brand names ===
- Numorphan (suppository and injectable solution)
- Opana ER (extended-release tablet): June 2017 FDA removal request due to rates of IV abuse.
- Opana IR (immediate-release tablet)
- O-Morphon in Bangladesh by Ziska pharmaceutical ltd.

The brand name Numorphan is derived by analogy to the Nucodan name for an oxycodone product (or vice versa) as well as Paramorphan/Paramorfan for dihydromorphine and Paracodin (dihydrocodeine). The only commercially available salt of oxymorphone in most of the world at this time is the hydrochloride, which has a free base conversion ratio of 0.891, and oxymorphone hydrochloride monohydrate has a factor of 0.85.

Generic pill markings are ATV10/APO; HK10 (10 mgs) oblong white and ATV20/APO; HK20 (20 mgs) oblong white.

=== Abuse ===
In 1924, the United States banned the sale and importation of opium for the manufacture of heroin, an opioid pain medication which was being abused. See Anti-Heroin Act of 1924.

Beginning in the 1990s, prescription opioid drug abuse has been a prevalent public health issue of concern. Since 2013, with greatly increasing morbidity and deaths from overdoses of synthetic opioids, such as oxycodone, tramadol, and fentanyl, this issue has developed into a full-fledged epidemic. This has led to several other public health issues, including the spread of diseases like hepatitis C and human immunodeficiency virus (HIV).

In the United States, as of 2013 more than 12 million people abused opioid drugs at least once a year. In 2010, 16,652 deaths were related to opiate overdose, in 2015 this number increased to 33,091. In September 2013, new FDA labeling guidelines for long-acting and extended-release opioids required manufacturers to remove moderate pain as use indication, reserving the drug for "pain severe enough to require daily, around-the-clock, long-term opioid treatment" however it did not restrict physicians from prescribing opioids for moderate, "as needed" usage.

In January 2013, the Centers for Disease Control and Prevention (CDC) reported an illness associated with intravenous (IV) abuse of oral Opana ER (oxymorphone) in Tennessee. The syndrome resembled that of thrombotic thrombocytopenic purpura (TTP). Initial therapy included therapeutic plasma exchange, as for TTP. Unlike TTP, no deficient ADAMTS13 activity nor anti-ADAMTS13 antibody was found indicating a thrombotic microangiopathy of different underlying cause. If IV Opana abuse is acknowledged, supportive care, instead of therapeutic plasma exchange could be considered.

In January 2015, the first HIV outbreak linked to abuse of prescription opioid drugs was identified by the Indiana State Department of Health (ISDH), in the small, rural community of Scott County in southeastern Indiana. ISDH launched an investigation into this HIV outbreak when 11 individuals were confirmed positive for HIV with ties tracing back to the same community. Three months into this investigation, ISDH diagnosed a total of 135 people with HIV, with the numbers still increasing. The cause of this outbreak has been linked to the sharing of needles between opioid abusers, which in some cases, involves sharing needles with up to nine different partners.

In late March 2015, reports indicated Austin, Indiana, was the center of an outbreak of HIV caused by oxymorphone use as an injectable recreational drug. The outbreak required emergency action by state officials. The NPR podcast "embedded" episode of 31 March 2016 was an in-depth account of a visit to oxymorphone abusers in Austin, Indiana. In 2016, the street price of oxymorphone was reported to be US$140.

The common opioid of abuse in this outbreak has been identified as Opana ER, a time-released oxymorphone pain killer formulated to be resistant to crushing, manufactured by Endo Pharmaceuticals. This harder to crush formulation was put into production in 2012 in an effort to reduce the risk of abuse from snorting the crushed up pill. However, opioid abusers circumvented this issue by finding a way to dissolve and inject the drug.

The extent of this outbreak has garnered the attention of both the CDC and FDA. The CDC opened a larger investigation into all disease outbreaks involving Opana ER, focusing on the incidence of thrombotic thrombocytopenic purpura (TTP)-like illness in the 2012 Tennessee outbreak, as well as the 2015 HIV outbreak in Indiana. The FDA launched a post-marketing safety study regarding the reformulation of Opana ER in 2012 and the Indiana state government helped fund another study exploring the link between HIV infection and injection use of oxymorphone in Indiana from 2014 to 2015.

The results of these studies found that the reformulation of Opana to a hard to crush tablet unintentionally increased the risk of transmission of acquired blood borne infections because opioid abusers switched from using the drug through the nasal route to injection. This epidemic caused the risk of acquiring a blood borne infection with the use of injectable opioids to increase in comparison to the risk of acquiring an infection when using injectable heroin or cocaine.

In June 2017, faced with the public health crisis, the opioid epidemic, the FDA asked Endo Pharmaceuticals to "remove its opioid pain medication, reformulated Opana ER (oxymorphone hydrochloride), from the market". In their 8 June 2017 press release they also noted that, this was the first time the FDA had taken steps to "remove a currently marketed opioid pain medication from sale due to public health consequences of abuse." By 6 July 2017, Endo International voluntarily complied with the FDA removal request.

== Veterinary use ==
Oxymorphone provides up to 5–6 hours of clinical analgesia in dogs and cats following intravenous administration. Intramuscular administration in dogs produces approximately 90 minutes of antinociception. Oxymorphone is ineffective when administered via the oral-transmucosal route in cats, likely due to low bioavailability. Only few reports exist on its use in large animal species due to the cost of oxymorphone.

== See also ==
- Oxymorphazone
- Oxymorphol
