= Norbuprenorphine-3-glucuronide =

Chemical compound

Clinical data
- ATC code: None

Identifiers
- IUPAC name: (5β,7β)-7-[(2R)-2-Hydroxy-3,3-dimethyl-2-butanyl]-6-methoxy-18,19-dihydro-4,5-epoxy-6,14-ethenomorphinan-3-yl (5ξ)-β-D-lyxo-hexopyranosiduronic acid
- CAS Number: 469887-29-4
- PubChem CID: 46782577
- ChemSpider: 35517741
- UNII: YPZ2R0PR50
- ECHA InfoCard: 100.230.712

Chemical and physical data
- Formula: C_{31}H_{43}NO_{10}
- Molar mass: 589.682 g·mol^{−1}
- 3D model (JSmol): Interactive image
- SMILES: C[C@]([C@H]1C[C@@]23CC[C@@]1([C@H]4[C@@]25CCN[C@@H]3Cc6c5c(c(cc6)O[C@H]7[C@@H]([C@H]([C@@H]([C@H](O7)C(=O)O)O)O)O)O4)OC)(C(C)(C)C)O
- InChI: InChI=1S/C31H43NO10/c1-27(2,3)28(4,38)16-13-29-8-9-31(16,39-5)26-30(29)10-11-32-17(29)12-14-6-7-15(22(42-26)18(14)30)40-25-21(35)19(33)20(34)23(41-25)24(36)37/h6-7,16-17,19-21,23,25-26,32-35,38H,8-13H2,1-5H3,(H,36,37)/t16-,17-,19+,20+,21-,23+,25-,26-,28+,29-,30+,31-/m1/s1; Key:OOLGGESLZHGXGC-TXYLTYGDSA-N

Norbuprenorphine-3-glucuronide (N3G) is a major active metabolite of the opioid modulator buprenorphine. It has affinity for the κ-opioid receptor (K_{i} = 300 nM) and the nociceptin receptor (K_{i} = 18 μM), but not for the μ- or δ-opioid receptors. Whether N3G acts as an agonist or antagonist of each of the former two respective sites has yet to be determined. In animals, N3G has been found to produce sedation, decreased locomotion, and a small amount of antinociception, properties which are consistent with the effects of κ-opioid receptor agonists. In addition, N3G has been found to reduce tidal volume but not respiratory rate. Unlike norbuprenorphine, but similarly to buprenorphine and buprenorphine-3-glucuronide, N3G is not a substrate for P-glycoprotein. However, due to its highly hydrophilic nature, N3G nonetheless passes the blood-brain-barrier in only very small amounts.

== Formation ==
The enzyme UDP-glucuronosyl transferase converts norbuprenorphine to its glucuronide by adding a sugar acid at the phenolic hydroxy group:

norbuprenorphine
+ UDP-glucuronate
UDP
norbuprenorphine-3-glucuronide

== See also ==
- Morphine-3-glucuronide
