= Noroxymorphone =

Chemical compound

Clinical data
- Dependence liability: High
- Routes of administration: Intravenous, intramuscular, subcutaneous, oral, rectal, intranasal
- Drug class: Opioid

Legal status
- Legal status: US: Schedule II

Identifiers
- IUPAC name: 7,8-Dihydro-14-hydroxynormorphinone
- CAS Number: 33522-95-1
- PubChem CID: 5497189
- DrugBank: DBMET00424
- ChemSpider: 4593755
- UNII: 9NZ7111A9O
- CompTox Dashboard (EPA): DTXSID80955145
- ECHA InfoCard: 100.046.859

Chemical and physical data
- Formula: C_{16}H_{17}NO_{4}
- Molar mass: 287.315 g·mol^{−1}
- 3D model (JSmol): Interactive image
- SMILES: Oc1ccc2C[C@H]3NCC[C@@]45[C@@H](Oc1c24)C(=O)CC[C@@]35O
- InChI: InChI=1S/C16H17NO4/c18-9-2-1-8-7-11-16(20)4-3-10(19)14-15(16,5-6-17-11)12(8)13(9)21-14/h1-2,11,14,17-18,20H,3-7H2/t11-,14+,15+,16-/m1/s1; Key:HLMSIZPQBSYUNL-IPOQPSJVSA-N

Noroxymorphone is an opioid which is both a metabolite of oxymorphone and oxycodone and is manufactured specifically as an intermediate in the production of opioid antagonists such as naltrexone and others. It is a potent agonist of the μ-opioid receptor, but is poorly able to cross the blood–brain barrier into the central nervous system, and for this reason, has only minimal analgesic activity.

In the United States, noroxymorphone is controlled as a Schedule II Narcotic controlled substance with an ACSCN of 9637. In 2014, the DEA set annual aggregate manufacturing quotas of 17,500 kg for conversion and 1,262.5 kg for sale.

== See also ==
- Oxymorphone hydrazone
- Oxymorphol – a metabolite of oxymorphone and an intermediate in the creation of hydromorphone
- Hydromorphone
- Norbuprenorphine
- Norbinaltorphimine
