= Norbuprenorphine =

Active metabolite of buprenorphine

Clinical data
- ATC code: None

Identifiers
- IUPAC name: (5α,6β,14β,18R)-18-[(1S)-1-hydroxy-1,2,2-trimethylpropyl]-6-methoxy-18,19-dihydro-4,5-epoxy-6,14-ethenomorphinan-3-ol
- CAS Number: 78715-23-8
- PubChem CID: 114976
- ChemSpider: 102911
- UNII: 7E53B4O073
- CompTox Dashboard (EPA): DTXSID60891436
- ECHA InfoCard: 100.208.387

Chemical and physical data
- Formula: C_{25}H_{35}NO_{4}
- Molar mass: 413.558 g·mol^{−1}
- 3D model (JSmol): Interactive image
- SMILES: C[C@]([C@H]1C[C@@]23CC[C@@]1([C@H]4[C@@]25CCN[C@@H]3Cc6c5c(c(cc6)O)O4)OC)(C(C)(C)C)O
- InChI: InChI=1S/C25H35NO4/c1-21(2,3)22(4,28)16-13-23-8-9-25(16,29-5)20-24(23)10-11-26-17(23)12-14-6-7-15(27)19(30-20)18(14)24/h6-7,16-17,20,26-28H,8-13H2,1-5H3/t16-,17-,20-,22+,23-,24+,25-/m1/s1; Key:YOYLLRBMGQRFTN-IOMBULRVSA-N

Norbuprenorphine is a major active metabolite of the opioid modulator buprenorphine. It is a μ-opioid, δ-opioid, and nociceptin receptor full agonist, and a κ-opioid receptor partial agonist. In rats, unlike buprenorphine, norbuprenorphine produces marked respiratory depression but with very little antinociceptive effect. In explanation of these properties, norbuprenorphine has been found to be a high affinity P-glycoprotein substrate, and in accordance, shows very limited blood-brain-barrier penetration.

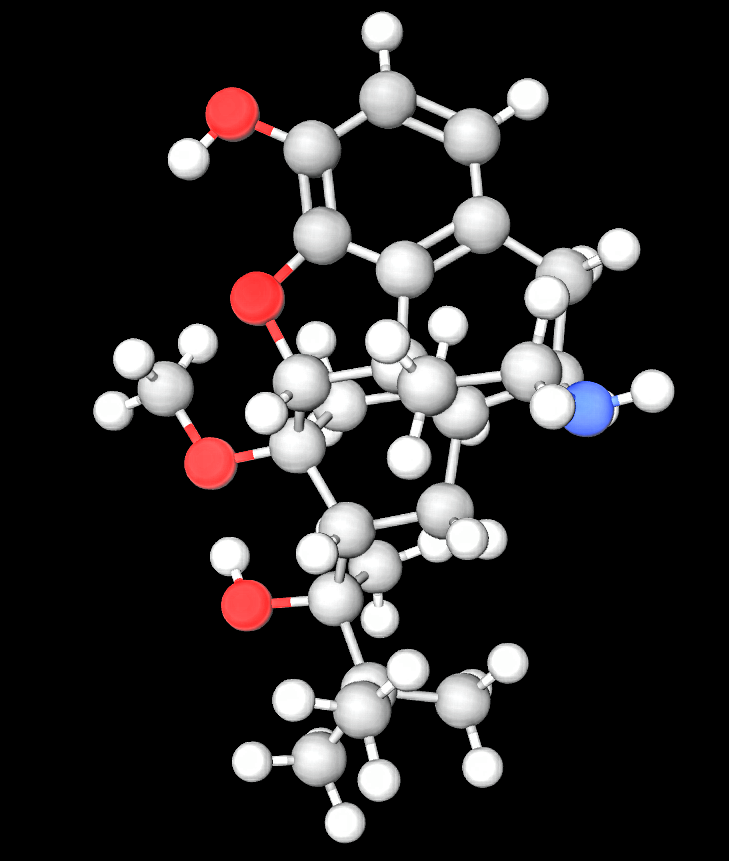
Norbuprenorphine

== See also ==
- Norbuprenorphine-3-glucuronide
- Buprenorphine-3-glucuronide
- Loperamide
- Noroxymorphone
