= Oxymorphol =

Chemical compound

Clinical data
- Other names: 4,5α-Epoxy-17-methylmorphinan-3,6,14-triol
- ATC code: N02A (WHO)

Pharmacokinetic data
- Metabolism: hepatic

Identifiers
- IUPAC name: (5α)-17-Methyl-4,5-epoxymorphinan-3,6,14-triol
- CAS Number: 54934-75-7
- PubChem CID: 6712731
- ChemSpider: 5144767
- UNII: 67P6D5Q6YK
- ChEMBL: ChEMBL1968360
- CompTox Dashboard (EPA): DTXSID301018770

Chemical and physical data
- Formula: C_{17}H_{21}NO_{4}
- Molar mass: 303.358 g·mol^{−1}
- 3D model (JSmol): Interactive image
- SMILES: CN1CC[C@]23c4c5ccc(c4O[C@H]2C(CC[C@]3([C@H]1C5)O)O)O
- InChI: InChI=1S/C17H21NO4/c1-18-7-6-16-13-9-2-3-10(19)14(13)22-15(16)11(20)4-5-17(16,21)12(18)8-9/h2-3,11-12,15,19-21H,4-8H2,1H3/t11?,12-,15+,16+,17-/m1/s1; Key:AABLHGPVOULICI-ZOFKVTQNSA-N

Oxymorphol is oxymorphone which has been hydrogenated at the 6-position and consists of a mixture of 4,5α-epoxy-17-methylmorphinan-3,6β,14-triol and 4,5α-epoxy-17-methylmorphinan-3,6α,14-triol (hydromorphinol). It is produced by the human body as an active metabolite of oxymorphone and some bacteria as an intermediate in turning morphine into hydromorphone. It can also be manufactured and is the subject of patents by drug companies looking for new semi-synthetic analgesics and cough suppressants.

A derivative of oxymorphol, 8-hydroxy-6-α-oxymorphol, was discovered in the first decade of the 21st century and the subject of a patent application by Endo Pharmaceuticals for an analgesic and antitussive.
