= Opioid modulator =

Drug

An opioid modulator (or opioid receptor modulator) is a drug which has mixed agonist and antagonist actions at different opioid receptors and thus cannot clearly be described as either an opioid agonist or antagonist. An example of an opioid modulator is buprenorphine, which is a partial agonist of the μ-opioid receptor and an antagonist of the κ-opioid receptor.

== See also ==
- Opioid
- Opioid antagonist
