= Phenol UDP-glucuronosyltransferase =

Phenol UDP-glucuronosyltransferase may refer to:

- UGT1A3, a human gene
- UGT1A4, a human gene
- UGT1A5, a human gene
- UGT1A6, a human gene
- UGT1A7 (gene), a human gene
- UGT1A8, a human gene
- UGT1A9, a human gene
- UGT1A10, a human gene
- UGT1A@, a human gene
