= Valproate =

Medication used for epilepsy, bipolar disorder and migraine

Valproate INN: Valproic acid

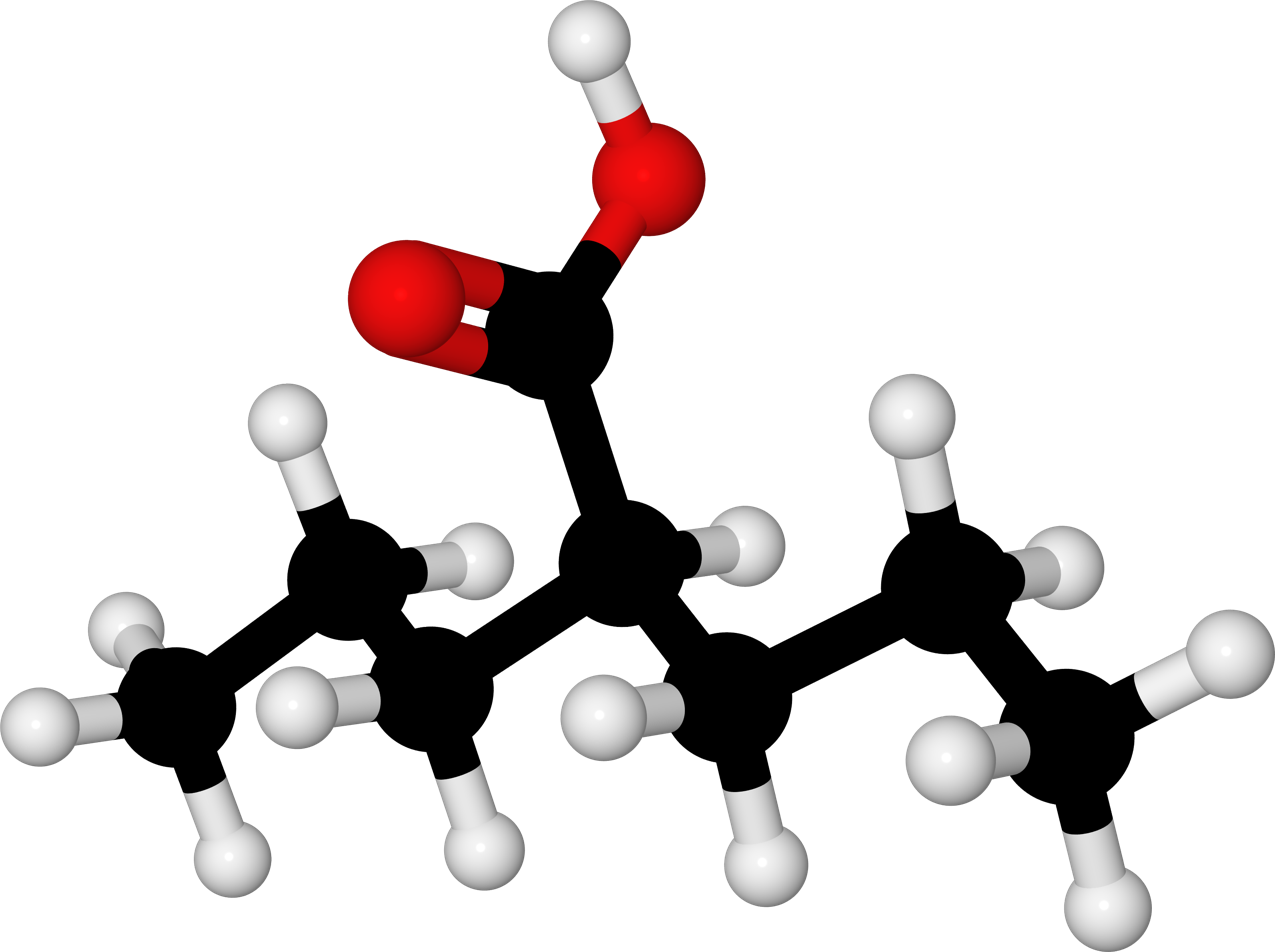

Clinical data
- Trade names: Depakene, Epilim, Convulex, others
- Other names: VPA; valproic acid; sodium valproate (sodium); valproate semisodium (semisodium); 2-propylvaleric acid
- AHFS/Drugs.com: Monograph
- MedlinePlus: a682412
- License data: US DailyMed: Valproic acid
- Pregnancy category: AU: D
- Routes of administration: Oral, intravenous
- Drug class: Anticonvulsant; Mood stabilizer; Sodium channel blocker; GABA-T inhibitor; Histone deacetylase inhibitor
- ATC code: N03AG01 (WHO)

Legal status
- Legal status: AU: S4 (Prescription only); BR: Class C1 (Other controlled substances); CA: ℞-only; UK: POM (Prescription only); US: ℞-only

Pharmacokinetic data
- Bioavailability: ~90%
- Protein binding: 80–90%
- Metabolism: Liver—glucuronide conjugation 30–50%; mitochondrial β-oxidation over 40%; oxidation, hydroxylation, and dehydrogenation 15–20%
- Elimination half-life: 9–16 hours
- Excretion: Mostly via hepatic metabolism, <3% in urine

Identifiers
- IUPAC name: 2-propylpentanoic acid
- CAS Number: 99-66-1
- PubChem CID: 3121
- IUPHAR/BPS: 7009
- DrugBank: DB00313
- ChemSpider: 3009
- UNII: 614OI1Z5WI
- KEGG: D00399
- ChEBI: CHEBI:39867
- ChEMBL: ChEMBL109
- NIAID ChemDB: 057177
- CompTox Dashboard (EPA): DTXSID6023733
- ECHA InfoCard: 100.002.525

Chemical and physical data
- Formula: C_{8}H_{16}O_{2}
- Molar mass: 144.214 g·mol^{−1}
- 3D model (JSmol): Interactive image
- SMILES: O=C(O)C(CCC)CCC
- InChI: InChI=1S/C8H16O2/c1-3-5-7(6-4-2)8(9)10/h7H,3-6H2,1-2H3,(H,9,10); Key:NIJJYAXOARWZEE-UHFFFAOYSA-N

Valproate (valproic acid, VPA, sodium valproate, or valproate semisodium) is a medication primarily used to treat epilepsy and as a mood stabilizer in the treatment of bipolar disorder. It is useful for the prevention of seizures in those with absence seizures, partial seizures, and generalized seizures. It can be given intravenously or by mouth, and the tablet forms exist in both long- and short-acting formulations.

Common side effects of valproate include nausea, vomiting, somnolence, and dry mouth. Serious side effects can include liver failure, and regular monitoring of liver function tests is therefore recommended. Other serious risks include pancreatitis and an increased suicide risk.

Valproate is known to cause serious abnormalities or birth defects in the fetus if taken during pregnancy, and is contra-indicated for women of childbearing age unless the drug is essential to their medical condition and the person is also prescribed a contraceptive. Reproductive warnings have also been issued for men using the drug.

Valproate is restricted in the United Kingdom for both women and men under age 55 due to teratogenicity in pregnant women and fertility problems in men. It is also restricted in the European Union. The United States Food and Drug Administration has indicated a black box warning given the frequency and severity of the side effects and teratogenicity. Additionally, there is also a black box warning due to risk of hepatotoxicity and pancreatitis.

Valproate has been in use in Japan for the prophylaxis of migraine since 2011. It is approved as an antimanic and antiseizure in Japan as well. In UK, valproate is approved for bipolar mania and epilepsy, and both valproate and divalproex are approved, although divalproex sodium is known as valproate semisodium.

Valproate's precise mechanism of action is unclear. Proposed mechanisms include affecting GABA levels, blocking voltage-gated sodium channels, inhibiting histone deacetylases, and increasing LEF1. Valproic acid is a branched short-chain fatty acid (SCFA), a derivative of valeric acid.

Valproate was originally synthesized in 1881 and came into medical use in 1962. It is on the World Health Organization's List of Essential Medicines. It is available as a generic medication. In 2023, it was the 160th most commonly prescribed medication in the United States, with more than 3 million prescriptions.

== Medical uses ==
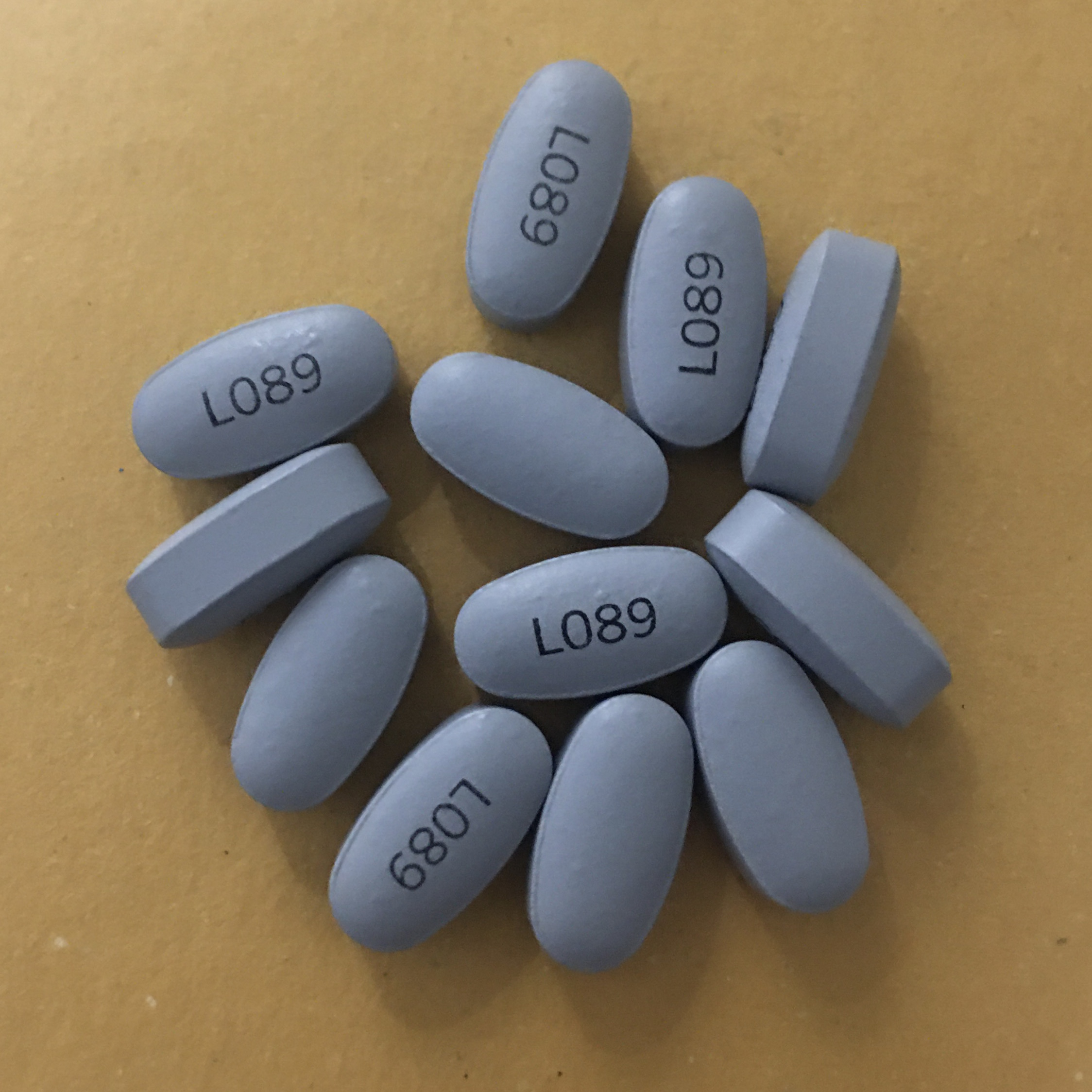
500 mg tablets of Depakote extended-release

Valproate or valproic acid is used primarily to treat epilepsy and bipolar disorder.

=== Epilepsy ===
Valproate has a broad spectrum of anticonvulsant activity, although it is primarily used as a first-line treatment for tonic–clonic seizures, absence seizures and myoclonic seizures and as a second-line treatment for partial seizures and infantile spasms. It has also been successfully given intravenously to treat status epilepticus.

In the US, valproic acid is also prescribed as an anti-epileptic drug indicated for the treatment of manic episodes associated with bipolar disorder; monotherapy and adjunctive therapy of complex partial seizures and simple and complex absence seizures; adjunctive therapy in people with multiple seizure types that include absence seizures.

=== Psychiatric disorders ===
Valproate products are used to treat manic or mixed episodes of bipolar disorder.

A 2016 systematic review compared the efficacy of valproate as an add-on for people with schizophrenia:

There is limited evidence that adding valproate to antipsychotics may be effective for overall response and also for specific symptoms, especially in terms of excitement and aggression. Valproate was associated with a number of adverse events among which sedation and dizziness appeared more frequently than in the control groups.

Outcome	Findings in words	Findings in numbers	Quality of evidence
Global outcome
Clinically significant response	When added to antipsychotic drugs valproate probably increases the chance of improvement. Data are based on moderate quality evidence.	RR 1.31 (1.16 to 1.47)	Moderate
Leaving the study early for any reason	Valproate in combination with antipsychotics may slightly reduce the chance of leaving the study early, but the difference between the two treatments is not clear. Data supporting this finding are based on moderate quality evidence.	RR 0.76 (0.47 to 1.24)	Moderate
Use of additional medication for sedation	The combination of valproate and antipsychotic drugs may increase the chance of being given additional sedating medication, but, at present it is not possible to be confident about the difference between the two treatments and data supporting this finding are very limited.	RR 3.65 (0.11 to 122.31)	Very low
Mental state
Average score (PANSS total, high = poor)	On average, people receiving the valproate combination scored lower (better) than people treated with antipsychotics in combination with placebo or antipsychotic drugs alone. There was a clear difference between the groups, but the meaning of this in day-to-day care is unclear.	MD 5.85 lower (7.8 lower to 3.91 lower)	Moderate
Adverse events
Abnormal liver function (blood test changes)*	Adding valproate to antipsychotic drug treatment does not clearly cause liver problems. Data supporting this finding are based on moderate quality evidence.	RR 1.26 (0.72 to 2.22)	Moderate
Nausea	Adding valproate to antipsychotic drugs probably causes little or no increase to the chance of feeling sick, but the difference between the two treatments is not clear. Data supporting this finding are based on moderate quality evidence.	RR 1.22 (0.80 to 1.86)	Moderate
Missing outcomes and notes
	Quality of life outcomes were not reported in the included studies. *Increase in alanine transaminase/gamma-glutamyl transpeptidase		

=== Other uses ===
Based upon five case reports, valproic acid may have efficacy in controlling the symptoms of the dopamine dysregulation syndrome that arise from the treatment of Parkinson's disease with levodopa.

Valproate is not commonly used to prevent or treat migraine headaches, but it may be prescribed if other medications are not effective.

The medication has been tested in the treatment of AIDS and cancer, owing to its histone-deacetylase-inhibiting effects. It has cardioprotective, kidney protective, antiinflammatory, and antimicrobial effects.

== Contraindications ==
Contraindications include:

- Pre-existing acute or chronic liver dysfunction or family history of severe liver inflammation (hepatitis), particularly medicine related.
- Pregnancy 11% risk of birth defects and 30-40% risk of neuro-developmental disabilities which can be permanent
- Known hypersensitivity to valproate or any of the ingredients used in the preparation
- Urea cycle disorders
- Hepatic porphyria
- Hepatotoxicity
- Mitochondrial disease
- Pancreatitis

== Adverse effects ==
Most common adverse effects include:

- Nausea (22%)
- Drowsiness (19%)
- Dizziness (12%)
- Vomiting (12%)
- Weakness (10%)

Serious adverse effects include:

- Bleeding
- Low blood platelets
- Encephalopathy
- Suicidal behavior and thoughts
- Manic behavior, such as pyromania or kleptomania
- Delusional fantasies accompanied by hallucinations (in children).
- Low body temperature

Valproic acid has a black box warning for hepatotoxicity, pancreatitis, and fetal abnormalities.

There is evidence that valproic acid may cause premature growth plate ossification in children and adolescents, resulting in decreased height. Valproic acid can also cause mydriasis, a dilation of the pupils. There is evidence that shows valproic acid may increase the chance of Polyendocrine metabolic ovarian syndrome (PMOS) in women with epilepsy or bipolar disorder. Studies have shown this risk of PMOS is higher in women with epilepsy compared to those with bipolar disorder. Weight gain is also possible. Valproic acid may decrease platelets in proportion to its dosage, particularly in women and the elderly.

=== Pregnancy ===
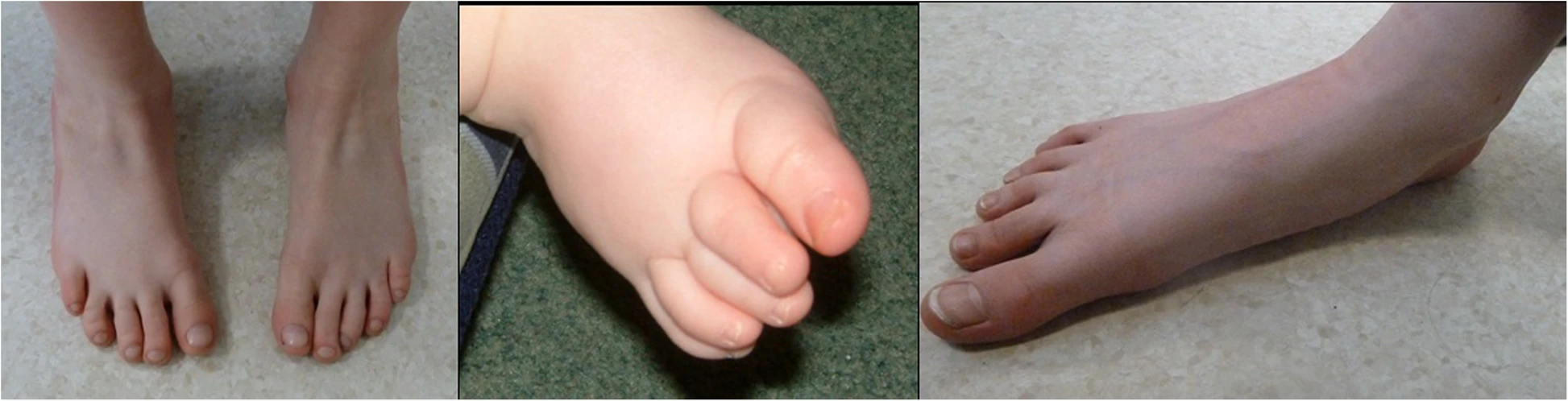
Minor limb malformations seen after valproate exposure

Fetal valproate spectrum disorder (FVSD), previously known as fetal valproate syndrome (FVS), is a rare disease caused by prenatal exposure to valproic acid (VPA), a medication commonly used to treat epilepsy, bipolar disorder, and migraines. This exposure can lead to a range of neurodevelopmental and physical symptoms, including cognitive impairments, developmental delays, autism spectrum disorder (ASD), attention deficit hyperactivity disorder (ADHD), and congenital malformations.

Valproate is a teratogen. Teratogens can cause birth defects. Valproate is restricted for all women under age 55 in the United Kingdom and European Union. It has a black box warning for pregnancy in the United States.

There are also restrictions for men. Children fathered by men taking valproate have a higher risk of neurodevelopmental disorders. Valproate is restricted for men under age 55 in the United Kingdom and European Union. The restrictions require two specialists to agree that there is no other effective or tolerated treatment for the patient.

=== Elderly ===
Valproate may cause increased somnolence in the elderly. In a trial of valproate in elderly patients with dementia, a significantly higher portion of valproate patients had somnolence compared to placebo. In approximately one-half of such patients, there was associated reduced nutritional intake and weight loss.

== Overdose ==
Therapeutic range of valproic acid
Form	Lower limit	Upper limit	Unit
Total (including protein bound)	50	125	μg/mL or mg/L
Total (including protein bound)	350	700	μmol/L
Free	6	22	μg/mL or mg/L
Free	35	70	μmol/L

Excessive amounts of valproic acid can result in somnolence, tremor, stupor, respiratory depression, coma, metabolic acidosis, and death. In general, serum or plasma valproic acid concentrations are in a range of 20–100 mg/L during controlled therapy, but may reach 150–1500 mg/L following acute poisoning. Monitoring of the serum level is often accomplished using commercial immunoassay techniques, although some laboratories employ gas or liquid chromatography. In contrast to other antiepileptic drugs, at present there is little favorable evidence for salivary therapeutic drug monitoring. Salivary levels of valproic acid correlate poorly with serum levels, partly due to valproate's weak acid property (pKa of 4.9).

In severe intoxication, hemoperfusion or hemofiltration can be an effective means of hastening elimination of the drug from the body. Supportive therapy should be given to all patients experiencing an overdose and urine output should be monitored. Supplemental L-carnitine is indicated in patients having an acute overdose and also prophylactically in high risk patients. Acetyl-L-carnitine lowers hyperammonemia less markedly than L-carnitine.

== Interactions ==
Valproate inhibits CYP2C9, glucuronyl transferase, and epoxide hydrolase and is highly protein bound and hence may interact with drugs that are substrates for any of these enzymes or are highly protein bound themselves. It may also potentiate the CNS depressant effects of alcohol. It should not be given in conjunction with other antiepileptics due to the potential for reduced clearance of other antiepileptics (including carbamazepine, lamotrigine, phenytoin and phenobarbital) and itself. It may also interact with:

- Aspirin: may increase valproate concentrations. May also interfere with valproate's metabolism.
- Benzodiazepines: may cause CNS depression and there are possible pharmacokinetic interactions.
- Carbapenem antibiotics: reduce valproate levels, potentially leading to seizures.
- Cimetidine: inhibits valproate's metabolism in the liver, leading to increased valproate concentrations.
- Erythromycin: inhibits valproate's metabolism in the liver, leading to increased valproate concentrations.
- Ethosuximide: valproate may increase ethosuximide concentrations and lead to toxicity.
- Felbamate: may increase plasma concentrations of valproate.
- Mefloquine: may increase valproate metabolism combined with the direct epileptogenic effects of mefloquine.
- Oral contraceptives: may reduce plasma concentrations of valproate.
- Primidone: may accelerate metabolism of valproate, leading to a decline of serum levels and potential breakthrough seizure.
- Rifampicin: increases the clearance of valproate, leading to decreased valproate concentrations.
- Warfarin: valproate may increase free warfarin concentration and prolong bleeding time.
- Zidovudine: valproate may increase zidovudine serum concentration and lead to toxicity.

== Pharmacology ==
=== Pharmacodynamics ===
Although the mechanism of action of valproate is not fully understood, traditionally, its anticonvulsant effect has been attributed to the blockade of voltage-gated sodium channels and increased brain levels of the inhibitory synaptic neurotransmitter gamma-aminobutyric acid (GABA). The GABAergic effect is also believed to contribute towards the anti-manic properties of valproate. In animals, sodium valproate raises cerebral and cerebellar levels of GABA, possibly by inhibiting GABA degradative enzymes, such as GABA transaminase, succinate-semialdehyde dehydrogenase and by inhibiting the re-uptake of GABA by neuronal cells. Prevention of neurotransmitter-induced hyperexcitability of nerve cells via Kv7.2 channel and AKAP5 may also contribute to its mechanism. Valproate has been shown to protect against a seizure-induced reduction in phosphatidylinositol (3,4,5)-trisphosphate (PIP3) as a potential therapeutic mechanism.

Valproate activities
Enzyme	IC_{50} (μM)
HDAC1	3.94–35.5
HDAC2	59.3
HDAC3	218.5
HDAC4	>15,000
HDAC5	>15,000
HDAC6	>20,000
HDAC7	>15,000
HDAC8	1.59–97.1
HDAC9	>15,000
HDAC10	ND
HDAC11	ND
Refs:

Valproate is a weak or low-potency histone deacetylase inhibitor, specifically of the class I HDAC1, HDAC2, HDAC3, and HDAC8, but not of other HDACs. Earlier studies found a wide range of inhibitory potencies of valproate against HDACs, ranging from low micromolar to millimolar concentrations, but subsequent work with improved methodology has supported greater inhibitory potencies, with IC_{50} values in the range of 36 to 219 μM for the class I HDACs. For comparison, valproate was found to be 4- to 46-fold less potent in inhibiting the class I HDACs relative to butyric acid (butyrate). By inhibiting HDACs, valproate promotes more transcriptionally active chromatin structures, that is it exerts an epigenetic effect. This has been proven in mice: Valproic acid induced histone hyperacetylation had brain function effects on the next generation of mice through changes in sperm DNA methylation. Intermediate molecules include VEGF, BDNF, and GDNF.

==== Endocrine actions ====
Valproic acid has been found to be an antagonist of the androgen and progesterone receptors, and hence as a nonsteroidal antiandrogen and antiprogestogen, at concentrations much lower than therapeutic serum levels. In addition, the drug has been identified as a potent aromatase inhibitor, and suppresses estrogen concentrations. These actions are likely to be involved in the reproductive endocrine disturbances seen with valproic acid treatment.

Valproic acid has been found to directly stimulate androgen biosynthesis in the gonads via inhibition of histone deacetylases and has been associated with hyperandrogenism in women and increased 4-androstenedione levels in men. High rates of polyendocrine metabolic ovarian syndrome (PMOS) and menstrual disorders have also been observed in women treated with valproic acid.

=== Pharmacokinetics ===
Some metabolites of valproic acid. Glucuronidation and β-oxidation are the main metabolic pathways; ω-oxidation metabolites are considered hepatotoxic.

Taken by mouth, valproate is rapidly and virtually completely absorbed from the gut. When in the bloodstream, 80–90% of the substance are bound to plasma proteins, mainly albumin. Protein binding is saturable: it decreases with increasing valproate concentration, low albumin concentrations, the patient's age, additional use of other drugs such as aspirin, as well as liver and kidney impairment. Concentrations in the cerebrospinal fluid and in breast milk are 1 to 10% of blood plasma concentrations.

The vast majority of valproate metabolism occurs in the liver. Valproate is known to be metabolized by the cytochrome P450 enzymes CYP2A6, CYP2B6, CYP2C9, and CYP3A5. It is also known to be metabolized by the UDP-glucuronosyltransferase enzymes UGT1A3, UGT1A4, UGT1A6, UGT1A8, UGT1A9, UGT1A10, UGT2B7, and UGT2B15. Some of the known metabolites of valproate by these enzymes and uncharacterized enzymes include (see image):

- via glucuronidation (30–50%): valproic acid β-O-glucuronide
- via beta oxidation (>40%): 2E-ene-valproic acid, 2Z-ene-valproic acid, 3-hydroxyvalproic acid, 3-oxovalproic acid
- via omega oxidation: 5-hydroxyvalproic acid, 2-propyl-glutaric acid
- some others: 3E-ene-valproic acid, 3Z-ene-valproic acid, 4-ene-valproic acid, 4-hydroxyvalproic acid

All in all, over 20 metabolites are known.

In adult patients taking valproate alone, 30–50% of an administered dose is excreted in urine as the glucuronide conjugate. The other major pathway in the metabolism of valproate is mitochondrial beta oxidation, which typically accounts for over 40% of an administered dose. Typically, less than 20% of an administered dose is eliminated by other oxidative mechanisms. Less than 3% of an administered dose of valproate is excreted unchanged (i.e., as valproate) in urine. Only a small amount is excreted via the faeces. Elimination half-life is 16±3 hours and can decrease to 4–9 hours when combined with enzyme inducers.

== Chemistry ==
Valproic acid is a branched short-chain fatty acid (SCFA) and the 2-n-propyl derivative of valeric acid (valerate; pentanoic acid; pentanoate). It is also a GABA analogue, or analogue of the inhibitory neurotransmitter γ-aminobutyric acid (GABA). Other analogues of valproic acid include valproate pivoxil, valpromide, and valnoctamide.

== History ==
Valproic acid was first synthesized in 1882 by Beverly S. Burton as an analogue of valeric acid, found naturally in valerian. Valproic acid is a carboxylic acid, a clear liquid at room temperature. For many decades, its only use was in laboratories as a "metabolically inert" solvent for organic compounds. In 1962, the French researcher Pierre Eymard serendipitously discovered the anticonvulsant properties of valproic acid while using it as a vehicle for a number of other compounds that were being screened for antiseizure activity. He found it prevented pentylenetetrazol-induced convulsions in laboratory rats. It was approved as an antiepileptic drug in 1967 in France and has become the most widely prescribed antiepileptic drug worldwide. Valproic acid has also been used for migraine prophylaxis and bipolar disorder.

== Society and culture ==
Valproate is available as a generic medication.

=== Restrictions ===
In 2024, for those under age 55, additional restrictions for valproate prescription have been imposed in the United Kingdom. Patients under 55 can still receive valproate, but need to obtain the permission of two specialists. The restrictions are, in women, due to the potential for birth defects in children born of women of childbearing age. In men, the restrictions are due to the potential for reversible male infertility, testicular problems, and the risks of neurodevelopmental conditions in children born to men taking valproate in the 3 months before conception. Similar restrictions have been imposed in the European Union for both women and men. In February 2026, a French man, Jean-Marc Laurent, filed what has been described as the first legal complaint related to paternal exposure to valproate, alleging that his child developed neurodevelopmental disorders after he had been treated with the drug prior to conception.

=== Approval status ===
Indications	(United States) FDA-labelled indication?	(Australia) TGA-labelled indication?	(United Kingdom) MHRA-labelled indication?	Literature support
Epilepsy	Yes	Yes	Yes	Limited (depends on the seizure type; it can help with certain kinds of seizures: drug-resistant epilepsy, partial and absence seizures, can be used against glioblastoma and other tumors both to improve survival and treat seizures, and against tonic–clonic seizures and status epilepticus).
Bipolar mania	Yes	Yes	Yes	Limited.
Bipolar depression	No	No	No	Moderate.
Bipolar maintenance	No	No	No	Limited.
Migraine prophylaxis	Yes	Yes (accepted)	No	Limited.
Acute migraine management	No	No	No	Only negative results.
Schizophrenia	No	No	No	Weak evidence.
Agitation in dementia	No	No	No	Weak evidence. Not recommended for agitation in people with dementia. Increased rate of adverse effects, including a risk of serious adverse effects.
Fragile X syndrome	Yes (orphan)	No	No	Limited.
Familial adenomatous polyposis	Yes (orphan)	No	No	Limited.
Chronic pain & fibromyalgia	No	No	No	Limited.
Alcohol hallucinosis	No	No	No	One randomised double-blind placebo-controlled trial.
Intractable hiccups	No	No	No	Limited, five case reports support its efficacy, however.
Non-epileptic myoclonus	No	No	No	Limited, three case reports support its efficacy, however.
Cluster headaches	No	No	No	Limited, two case reports support its efficacy.
West syndrome	No	No	No	A prospective clinical trial supported its efficacy in treating infantile spasms.
HIV infection eradication	No	No	No	Double-blind placebo-controlled trials have been negative.
Myelodysplastic syndrome	No	No	No	Several clinical trials have confirmed its efficacy as a monotherapy, as an adjunct to tretinoin and as an adjunct to hydralazine.
Acute myeloid leukaemia	No	No	No	Two clinical trials have confirmed its efficacy in this indication as both a monotherapy and as an adjunct to tretinoin.
Cervical cancer	No	No	No	One clinical trial supports its use here.
Melanoma	No	No	No	One phase II study has seemed to discount its efficacy.
Breast cancer	No	No	No	A phase II study has supported its efficacy.
Impulse control disorder	No	No	No	Limited.

=== Off-label uses ===
In 2012, pharmaceutical company Abbott paid $1.6 billion in fines to US federal and state governments for illegal promotion of off-label uses for Depakote, including the sedation of elderly nursing home residents.

Some studies have suggested that valproate may reopen the critical period for learning absolute pitch and possibly other skills such as language.

=== Formulations ===
Sodium valproate
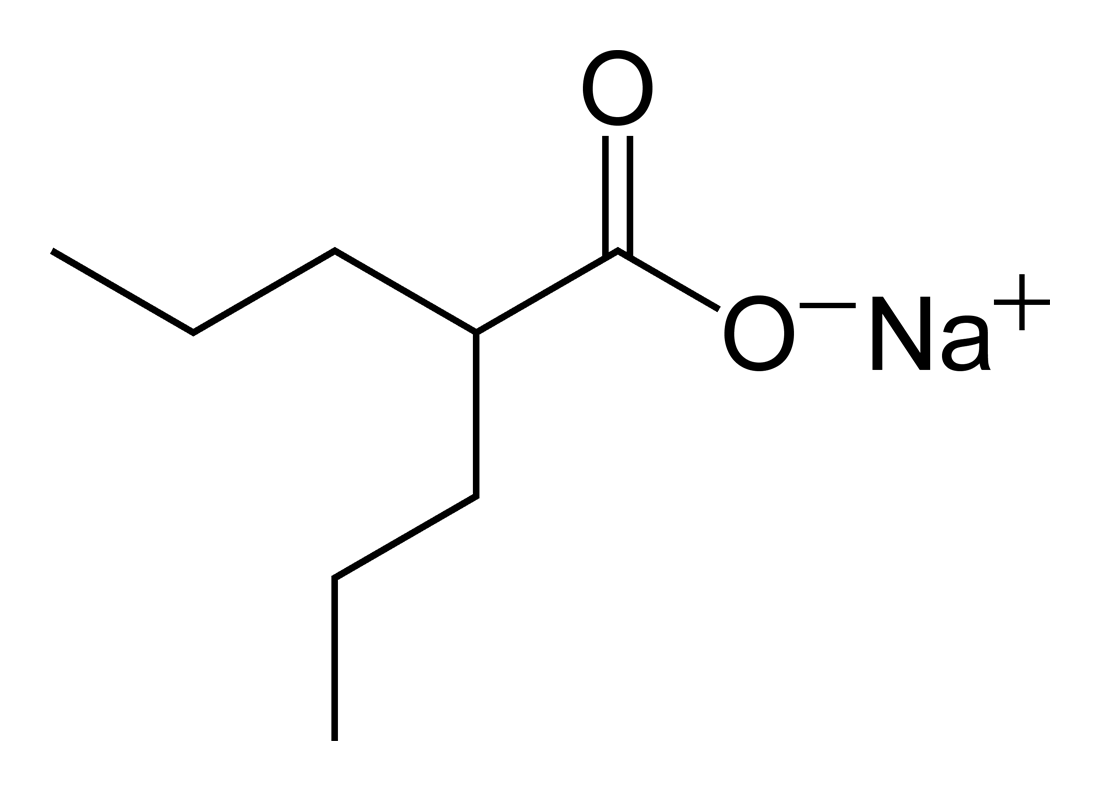

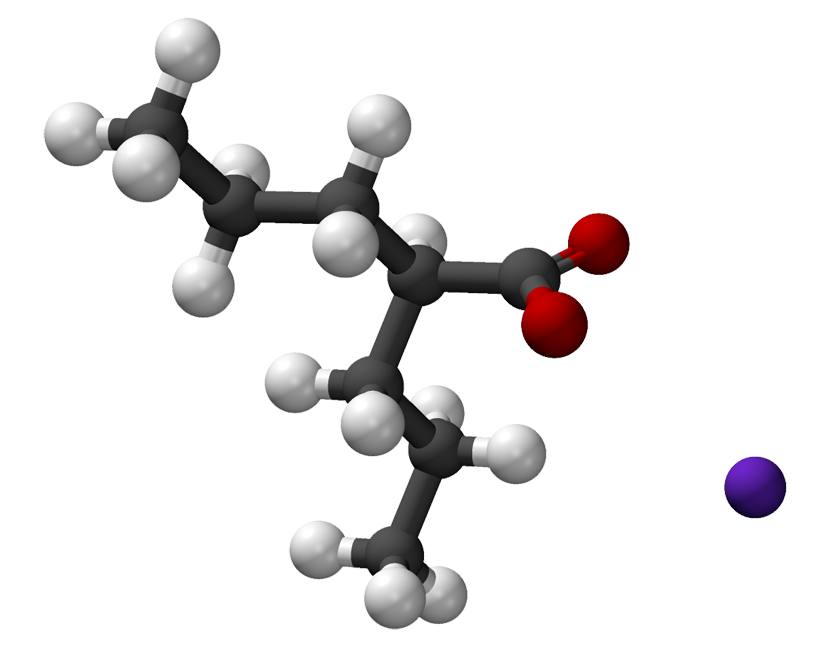

Clinical data
- Other names: valproate sodium (USAN US)
- License data: US DailyMed: Valproate sodium

Legal status
- Legal status: US: ℞-only

Identifiers
- IUPAC name: sodium 2-propylpentanoate
- CAS Number: 1069-66-5
- PubChem CID: 16760703
- DrugBank: DBSALT001257
- ChemSpider: 13428
- UNII: 5VOM6GYJ0D
- KEGG: D00710
- ChEBI: CHEBI:9925
- ChEMBL: ChEMBL433
- CompTox Dashboard (EPA): DTXSID6023733
- ECHA InfoCard: 100.002.525

Chemical and physical data
- Formula: C_{8}H_{15}NaO_{2}
- Molar mass: 166.196 g·mol^{−1}
- 3D model (JSmol): Interactive image
- SMILES: CCCC(CCC)C(=O)[O-].[Na+]
- InChI: InChI=1S/C8H16O2.Na/c1-3-5-7(6-4-2)8(9)10;/h7H,3-6H2,1-2H3,(H,9,10);/q;+1/p-1; Key:AEQFSUDEHCCHBT-UHFFFAOYSA-M

Valproate semisodium

Clinical data
- Trade names: Depakote, others
- Other names: semisodium valproate, divalproex sodium (USAN US)
- License data: US DailyMed: Divalproex sodium

Legal status
- Legal status: US: ℞-only

Identifiers
- IUPAC name: sodium 2-propylpentanoate;2-propylpentanoic acid
- CAS Number: 76584-70-8
- PubChem CID: 23663956
- DrugBank: DBSALT000185
- ChemSpider: 48337
- UNII: 644VL95AO6
- KEGG: D00304
- ChEBI: CHEBI:4667
- ChEMBL: ChEMBL2105613
- CompTox Dashboard (EPA): DTXSID6023733
- ECHA InfoCard: 100.002.525

Chemical and physical data
- Formula: C_{16}H_{31}NaO_{4}
- Molar mass: 310.410 g·mol^{−1}
- 3D model (JSmol): Interactive image
- SMILES: CCCC(CCC)C(=O)O.CCCC(CCC)C(=O)[O-].[Na+]
- InChI: InChI=1S/2C8H16O2.Na/c2*1-3-5-7(6-4-2)8(9)10;/h2*7H,3-6H2,1-2H3,(H,9,10);/q;;+1/p-1; Key:MSRILKIQRXUYCT-UHFFFAOYSA-M

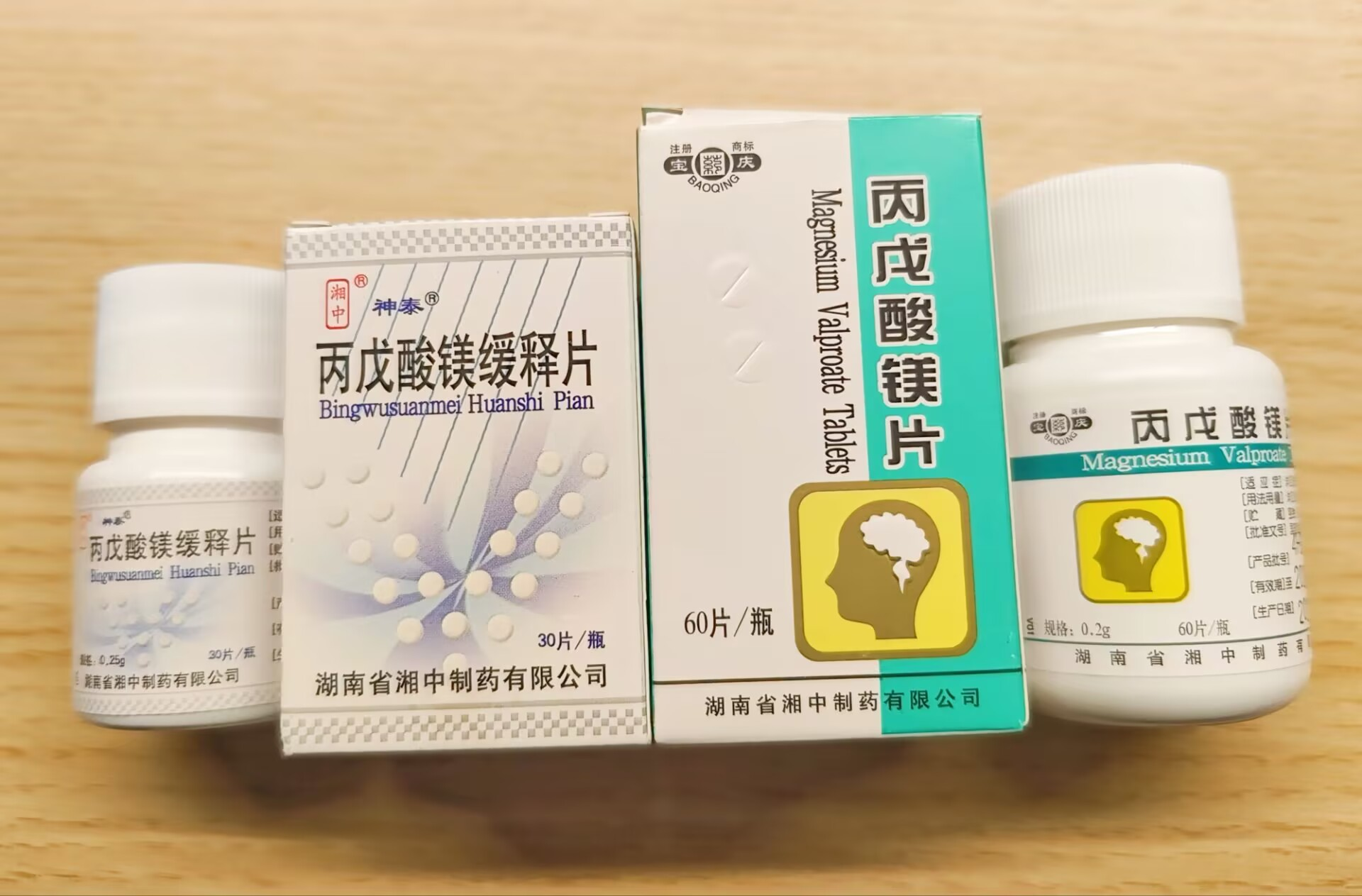
Magnesium valproate extended-release and instant-release tablets manufactured in China.

Valproate exists in two main molecular variants: sodium valproate and valproic acid without sodium (often implied by simply valproate). A mixture between these two is termed semisodium valproate. It is unclear whether there is any difference in efficacy between these variants, except from the fact that about 10% more mass of sodium valproate is needed than valproic acid without sodium to compensate for the sodium itself. In Europe, the US, and many other countries three variants of valproate are sold: valproic acid, sodium valproate and valproate semisodium also known as divalproex sodium, the latter is believed to have fewer gastrointestinal side-effects. Divalproex sodium tablets are a formulation comprising valproate sodium and valproic acid in a 1:1 molar relationship.

Magnesium valproate is also available in China.

=== Terminology ===
Valproate is a negative ion. The conjugate acid of valproate is valproic acid (VPA). Valproic acid is fully ionized into valproate at the physiologic pH of the human body, and valproate is the active form of the drug. Sodium valproate is the sodium salt of valproic acid. Divalproex sodium is a coordination complex composed of equal parts of valproic acid and sodium valproate.

==== Brand names of valproic acid ====
Branded products include:

- Absenor (Orion Corporation Finland)
- Convulex (G.L. Pharma GmbH Austria)
- Depakene (Abbott Laboratories in US and Canada)
- Depakin (Sanofi S.R.L. Italy)
- Depakine (Sanofi Aventis France)
- Depakine (Sanofi Synthelabo Romania)
- Depalept (Sanofi Aventis Israel)
- Deprakine (Sanofi Aventis Finland)
- Encorate (Sun Pharmaceuticals India)
- Epilim (Sanofi Synthelabo Australia and South Africa)
- Stavzor (Noven Pharmaceuticals Inc.)
- Valcote (Abbott Laboratories Argentina)
- Valpakine (Sanofi Aventis Brazil)
- Orfiril (Desitin Arzneimittel GmbH Norway)

==== Brand names of sodium valproate ====
===== Portugal =====
- Tablets – Diplexil-R by Bial.

===== United States =====
- Intravenous injection – Depacon by Abbott Laboratories.
- Syrup – Depakene by Abbott Laboratories. (Note: Depakene capsules are valproic acid).
- Depakote tablets are a mixture of sodium valproate and valproic acid.
- Tablets – Eliaxim by Bial.

===== Australia =====
- Epilim Crushable Tablets Sanofi
- Epilim Sugar Free Liquid Sanofi
- Epilim Syrup Sanofi
- Epilim Tablets Sanofi
- Sodium Valproate Sandoz Tablets Sanofi
- Valpro Tablets Alphapharm
- Valproate Winthrop Tablets Sanofi
- Valprease tablets Sigma

===== New Zealand =====
- Epilim by Sanofi-Aventis

All the above formulations are Pharmac-subsidised.

===== UK =====
- Depakote Tablets (as in USA)
- Tablets – Orlept by Wockhardt and Epilim by Sanofi
- Oral solution – Orlept Sugar Free by Wockhardt and Epilim by Sanofi
- Syrup – Epilim by Sanofi-Aventis
- Intravenous injection – Epilim Intravenous by Sanofi
- Extended release tablets – Epilim Chrono by Sanofi is a combination of sodium valproate and valproic acid in a 2.3:1 ratio.
- Enteric-coated tablets – Epilim EC200 by Sanofi is a 200 mg sodium valproate enteric-coated tablet.

====== UK only ======
- Capsules – Episenta prolonged release by Beacon
- Sachets – Episenta prolonged release by Beacon
- Intravenous solution for injection – Episenta solution for injection by Beacon

===== Germany, Switzerland, Norway, Finland, Sweden =====
- Tablets – Orfiril by Desitin Pharmaceuticals
- Intravenous injection – Orfiril IV by Desitin Pharmaceuticals

===== South Africa =====
- Syrup – Convulex by Byk Madaus
- Tablets – Epilim by Sanofi-synthelabo

===== Malaysia =====
- Tablets – Epilim (200 ENTERIC COATED) by Sanofi-Aventis
- Controlled release tablets – Epilim Chrono (500 CONTROLLED RELEASE) by Sanofi-Aventis

===== Romania =====
- Companies are SANOFI-AVENTIS FRANCE, GEROT PHARMAZEUTIKA GMBH and DESITIN ARZNEIMITTEL GMBH
- Types are Syrup, Extended release mini tablets, Gastric resistant coated tablets, Gastric resistant soft capsules, Extended release capsules, Extended release tablets and Extended release coated tablets

===== Canada =====
- Intravenous injection – Epival or Epiject by Abbott Laboratories.
- Syrup – Depakene by Abbott Laboratories its generic formulations include Apo-Valproic and ratio-Valproic.

===== Japan =====
- Tablets – Depakene by Kyowa Hakko Kirin
- Extended release tablets – Depakene-R by Kyowa Hakko Kogyo and Selenica-R by Kowa
- Syrup – Depakene by Kyowa Hakko Kogyo

===== Europe =====
In much of Europe, Dépakine and Depakine Chrono (tablets) are equivalent to Epilim and Epilim Chrono above.

===== Taiwan =====
- Tablets (white round tablet) – Depakine (Chinese: 帝拔癲; pinyin: di-ba-dian) by Sanofi Winthrop Industrie (France)

===== Iran =====
- Tablets – Epival 200 (enteric coated tablet) and Epival 500 (extended release tablet) by Iran Najo
- Slow release tablets – Depakine Chrono by Sanofi Winthrop Industrie (France)

===== Israel =====
Depalept and Depalept Chrono (extended release tablets) are equivalent to Epilim and Epilim Chrono above. Manufactured and distributed by Sanofi-Aventis.

===== India, Russia and CIS countries =====
- Valparin Chrono by Sanofi India
- Valprol CR by Intas Pharmaceutical (India)
- Encorate Chrono by Sun Pharmaceutical (India)
- Serven Chrono by Leeven APL Biotech (India)

===== Uruguay =====
- Tablets – DI DPA by Megalabs

==== Brand names of valproate semisodium ====
- Brazil – Depakote by Abbott Laboratories and Torval CR by Torrent do Brasil
- Canada – Epival by Abbott Laboratories
- Mexico – Epival and Epival ER (extended release) by Abbott Laboratories
- United Kingdom – Depakote (for psychiatric conditions) and Epilim (for epilepsy) by Sanofi-Aventis and generics
- United States – Depakote and Depakote ER (extended release) by Abbott Laboratories and generics
- India – Valance and Valance OD by Abbott Healthcare Pvt Ltd, Divalid ER by Linux laboratories Pvt Ltd, Valex ER by Sigmund Promedica, Dicorate by Sun Pharma
- Germany – Ergenyl Chrono by Sanofi-Aventis and generics
- Chile – Valcote and Valcote ER by Abbott Laboratories
- France and other European countries – Depakote
- Peru – Divalprax by AC Farma Laboratories
- China – Diprate OD

== Research ==
A 2023 systematic review of the literature identified only one study in which valproate was evaluated in the treatment of seizures in infants aged 1 to 36 months. In a randomized control trial, valproate alone was found to show poorer outcomes for infants than valproate plus levetiracetam in terms of reduction of seizures, freedom from seizures, daily living ability, quality of life, and cognitive abilities.
