= Glucuronosyltransferase =

Class of enzymes

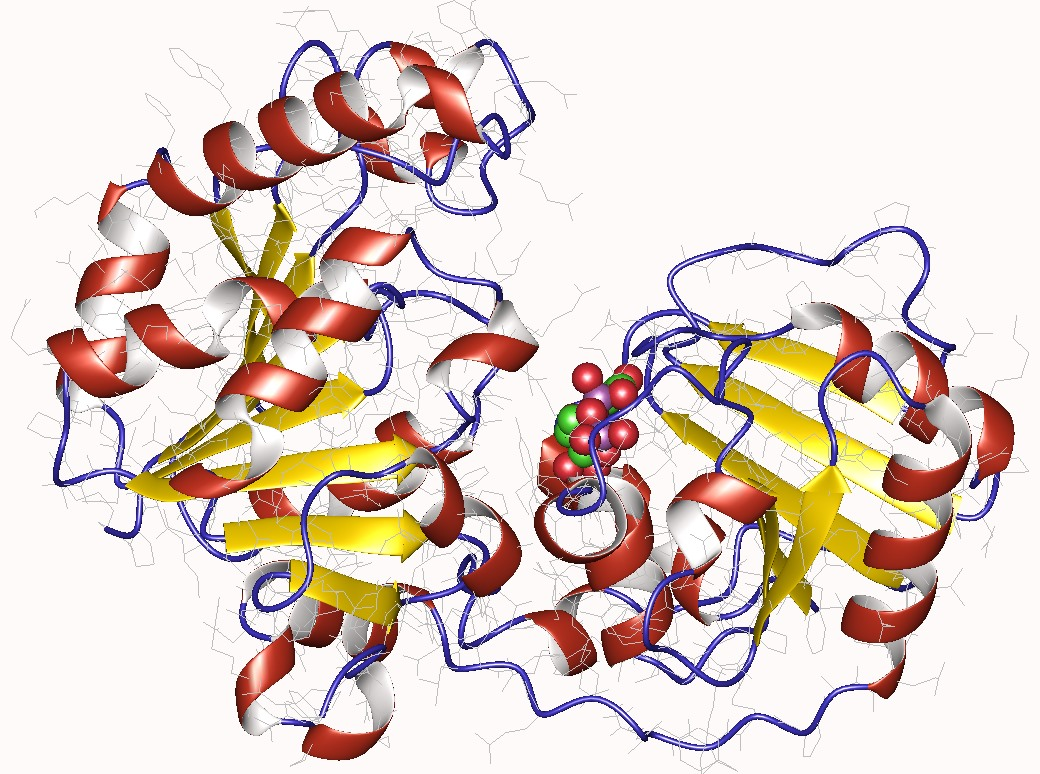
- Glucuronosyltransferase monomer, Xanthomonas campestris

Identifiers
- EC no.: 2.4.1.17
- CAS no.: 9030-08-4

Databases
- BRENDA: enzyme data
- ExPASy: NiceZyme view
- KEGG: enzyme entry
- MetaCyc: metabolic pathway
- Rhea: reactions
- PDB structures: RCSB PDB PDBe PDBsum
- Gene Ontology: AmiGO / QuickGO
Search
- PMC: articles
- PubMed: articles
- NCBI: proteins

UDP-glucuronosyl and UDP-glucosyl transferase
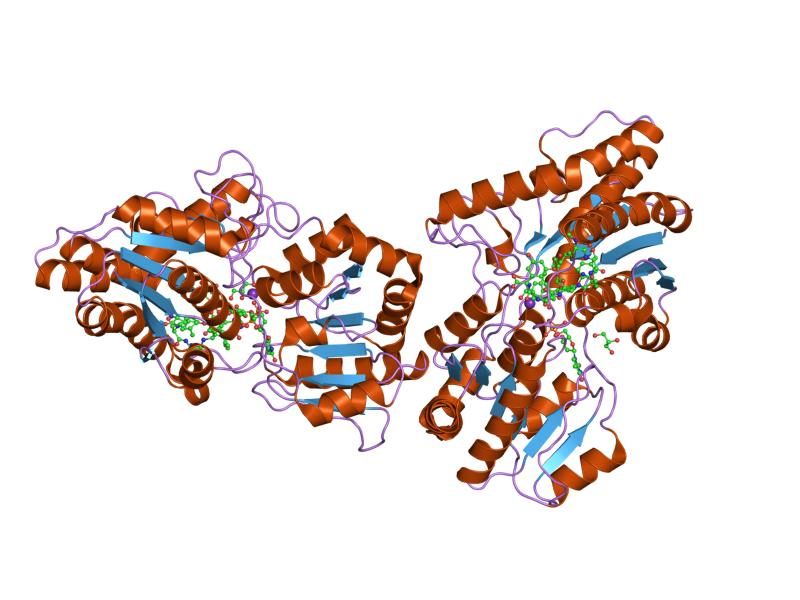
- Structure of TDP-vancosaminyltransferase GtfD as a complex with TDP and the natural substrate, desvancosaminyl vancomycin.

Identifiers
- Symbol: UDPGT
- Pfam: PF00201
- InterPro: IPR002213
- PROSITE: PDOC00359
- SCOP2: 1rrv / SCOPe / SUPFAM
- Membranome: 476
Available protein structures:
- PDB: IPR002213 PF00201 (ECOD; PDBsum)
- AlphaFold: IPR002213; PF00201

Uridine 5'-diphospho-glucuronosyltransferase (UDP-glucuronosyltransferase, UDPGT or UGT) is a microsomal glycosyltransferase (EC 2.4.1.17) that catalyzes the transfer of the glucuronic acid component of UDP-glucuronic acid to a small hydrophobic molecule. This is a glucuronidation reaction.

Alternative names:

- glucuronyltransferase
- UDP-glucuronyl transferase
- UDP-GT

== Function ==
Glucuronosyltransferases are responsible for the process of glucuronidation, a major part of phase II metabolism. Arguably the most important of the Phase II (conjugative) enzymes, UGTs have been the subject of increasing scientific inquiry since the mid-to-late 1990s.

The reaction catalyzed by the UGT enzyme involves the addition of a glucuronic acid moiety to xenobiotics and is the most important pathway for the human body's elimination of the most frequently prescribed drugs. It is also the major pathway for foreign chemical (dietary, environmental, pharmaceutical) removal for most drugs, dietary substances, toxins and endogenous substances. For example, the sex hormone estrone is converted to its glucuronide:

estrone
+ UDPGA
UDP
estrone glucuronide

The glucuronidation reaction consists of the transfer of the glucuronosyl group from uridine 5'-diphospho-glucuronic acid (UDPGA) to substrate molecules that contain oxygen, nitrogen, sulfur or carboxyl functional groups. The resulting glucuronide is more polar (e.g. hydrophilic) and more easily excreted than the substrate molecule. The product solubility in blood is increased allowing it to be eliminated from the body by the kidneys.

UGT is present in humans, other animals, plants, and bacteria. Famously, UGT enzymes are not present in the genus Felis, and this accounts for a number of unusual toxicities in the cat family.

== Diseases ==
A deficiency in the bilirubin specific form of glucuronosyltransferase (UGT-1A) is thought to be the cause of Gilbert's syndrome, which is characterized by unconjugated hyperbilirubinemia.

It is also associated with Crigler–Najjar syndrome, a more serious disorder where the enzyme's activity is either completely absent (Crigler–Najjar syndrome type I) or less than 10% of normal (type II).

Infants may have a developmental deficiency in UDP-glucuronyl transferase, and are unable to hepatically metabolize the antibiotic drug chloramphenicol which requires glucuronidation. This leads to a condition known as gray baby syndrome.

=== Causes ===
Causes of unconjugated hyperbilirubinemia are divided into three main categories, namely, excessive bilirubin synthesis, liver bilirubin uptake malfunction, and bilirubin conjugation compromise.

As to excessive bilirubin synthesis, both intravascular hemolysis and extravascular hemolysis can involve in the pathophysiology. Additionally, dyserythropoiesis and extravasation of blood into tissues such as angioedema and edema can also lead to indirect hyperbilirubinemia, along with heart failure, medication-induced, ethinyl estradiol, chronic hepatitis, and cirrhosis that are, otherwise, attributed to hepatic bilirubin mal-uptake and bilirubin conjugation compromise, respectively.

== Genes ==
Human genes which encode UGT enzymes include:

- B3GAT1, B3GAT2, B3GAT3
- UGT1A1, UGT1A3, UGT1A4, UGT1A5, UGT1A6, UGT1A7, UGT1A8, UGT1A9, UGT1A10
- UGT2A1, UGT2A2, UGT2A3, UGT2B4, UGT2B7, UGT2B10, UGT2B11, UGT2B15, UGT2B17, UGT2B28
