= Ida Stephens Owens =

American scientist (1939–2020)

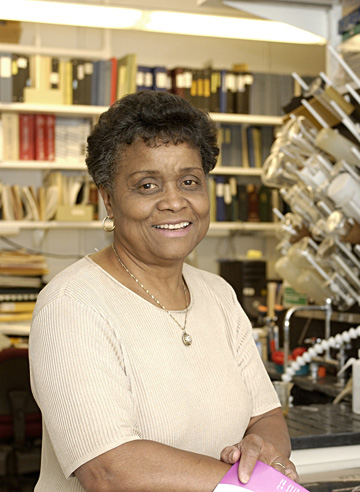
- Owens in her laboratory at the NIH
- Born: September 13, 1939; Whiteville, North Carolina
- Died: February 24, 2020 (aged 80)
- Education: Duke University (Ph.D., 1967)
- Known for: Drug-detoxifying enzyme metabolism
- Scientific career
- Fields: Physiology; Biochemistry
- Workplaces: National Institute of Child Health and Human Development
- Thesis: Amino Acid Esters as Inhibitors of Growth and of Amino Acyl-tRNA in Synthetases in Astasia Longa and Eugenia Gracilis (1967)
- Doctoral advisor: Jacob J. Blum

Ida Stephens Owens (September 13, 1939 – February 24, 2020) was an American biochemist known for her work with drug-detoxifying enzymes. She received her Ph.D from Duke University in 1967, making her one of the first two African Americans to receive a doctorate from the school. She spent her career at the National Institutes of Health (NIH), where she worked from 1968 to 2017 and pioneered the study of the genetics of human diseases and drug metabolism.

== Early life ==
Ida Virginia Stephens Owens was born in the small town of Whiteville, North Carolina. She grew up in Newark, New Jersey. Her mother died when she was six years old.

== Education ==
Owens' early education was in segregated public schools. Owens then attended North Carolina College, now North Carolina Central University, graduating in 1961 summa cum laude in Biology (B.S.) and Mathematics (minor). After graduating, she was employed as a laboratory assistant at a National Science Foundation Summer Institute for High School Teachers at North Carolina College, and she spent a summer in the lab of Daniel C. Tosteson in the Department of Physiology at Duke University. Then, in 1962, she began her Ph.D. studies of biochemistry and physiology in the laboratory Jacob J. Blum at Duke shortly after the university racially integrated its graduate and professional schools. When she graduated in 1967, she became one of two first African Americans, the first woman, to receive a Ph.D. from Duke University and the first woman to receive any degree in physiology from Duke. The Carolina Times, Durham's Black newspaper, published a front-page story about her graduation.

== Scientific career ==
After graduating, Owens held a postdoctoral position at the NIH, first at the then-called National Institute of Arthritis, Metabolic, and Digestive Diseases in the Laboratory of Biochemistry and Metabolism and then in the National Institute of Child Health and Human Development (NICHD) in the Section on Developmental Pharmacology in the Laboratory of Biomedical Sciences. During this time, she focused on how drugs are chemically processed in the body. In 1975, Owens began to lead her own independent research group at NIH NICHD within the Section on Drug Biotransformation, which later became the Section on Genetic Disorders of Drug Metabolism. She was the first African American investigator at NIH. Starting in 1988, Owens has directed NICHD's Section on Genetic Disorders of Drug Metabolism in the Program on Developmental Endocrinology and Genetics. She published scientific articles in the Journal of Biological Chemistry, the Archives of Biochemistry and Biophysics, Biochemistry, the Journal of Clinical Investigations, Gastroenterology, and Pharmacogenetics, among other journals.

=== Scientific advancements ===
Owens' postdoctoral work sparked her specific interest in a critical group of enzymes, called UDP-glucuronosyltransferases (abbreviated UGTs), which allow the body to detoxify harmful drugs, chemicals, and other toxins. By designing methods to research the genes that code for specific UGT enzymes, she identified a complex of 13 genes known as UGT1A. Her lab showed that one of these genes, UGT1A1, processes the protein bilirubin, which is a breakdown product of hemoglobin.

Owens' research group has subsequently made multiple advancements regarding UGT enzyme biology. Her laboratory was the first to identify a genetic defect in the gene UGT1A1 that leads to Crigler–Najjar syndrome. Crigler–Najjar syndrome is a disorder that disrupts normal modification and excretion of bilirubin, leading to jaundice. Owens' research group also identified that UGT enzymes must be activated before they can detoxify foreign chemicals and that in some cases suppressing these enzymes could enhance the effects of therapeutic drugs. Owens' laboratory found that activity of UGT enzymes can be lessened by kinase inhibitors and that protein kinase C and tyrosine kinase enzymes can alter the enzyme specificity, likely contributing to their ability to detoxify a wide range of foreign chemicals.

== Honors ==
Owens received the 1992 NIH Director's Award and, in 2013, the Duke University Graduate School's first Distinguished Alumni Award. In addition, in 2009, the American Asthma Foundation recognized Owens for being among the top 5% of cited authors in pharmacology journals. On top of these she is remembered in Duke Universities Portraits of Women Firsts.
