= B3GAT3 =

Protein-coding gene in humans

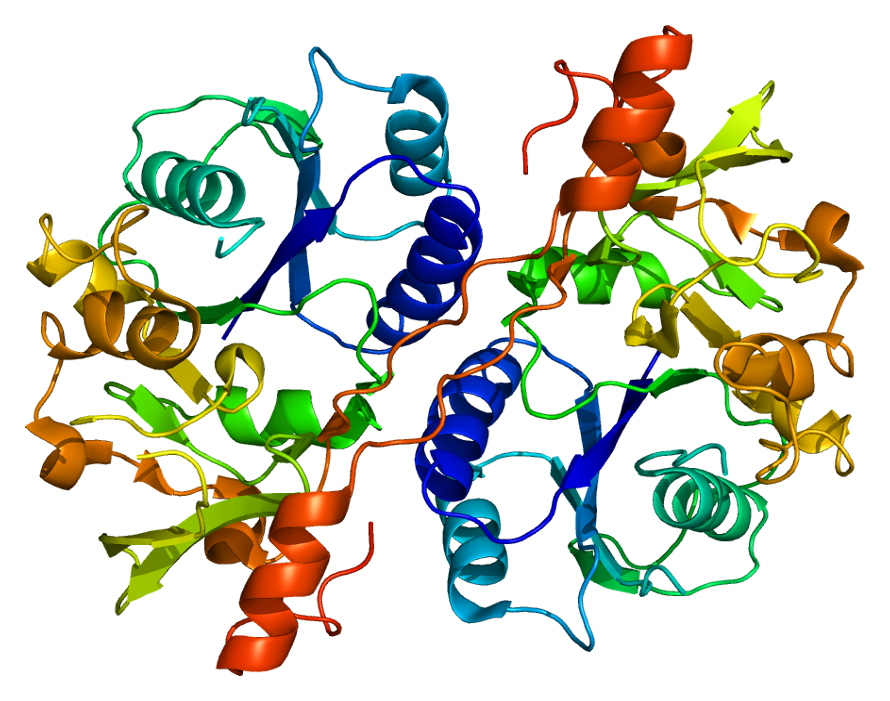

Identifiers
- Aliases: B3GAT3, GLCATI, glcUAT-I, JDSCD, beta-1,3-glucuronyltransferase 3
- External IDs: OMIM: 606374; MGI: 1919977; GeneCards: B3GAT3
Available structures
PDB	Ortholog search: PDBe RCSB
PDB	List of PDB id codes 1FGG, 1KWS, 3CU0
Enzyme activity
EC #	BRENDA	ExPASy	KEGG	MetaCyc
2.4.1.135	↗	↗	↗	↗

Gene location (Human)
Chr.	Chromosome 11 (human)
Band	11q12.3	Start	62,615,296 bp
Band	11q12.3	End	62,622,154 bp

Gene location (Mouse)
Chr.	Chromosome 19 (mouse)
Band	19|19 A	Start	8,897,738 bp
Band	19|19 A	End	8,904,600 bp
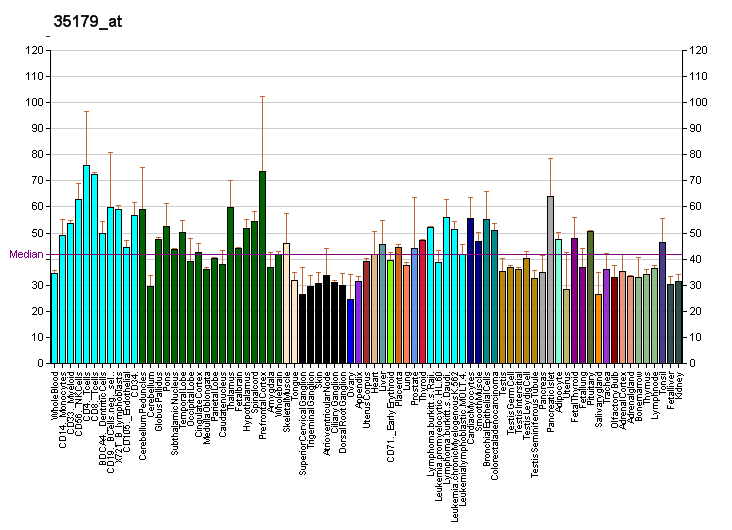

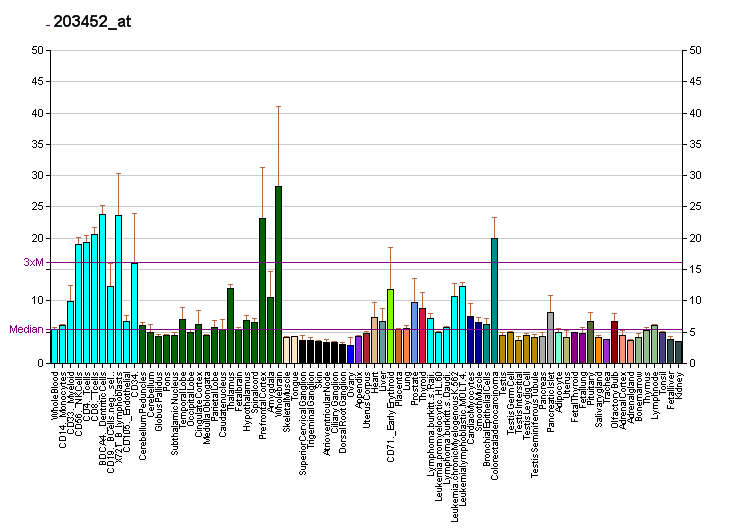
RNA expression pattern
Bgee	Human / Mouse (ortholog); Top expressed in: right hemisphere of cerebellum; anterior pituitary; granulocyte; right frontal lobe; C1 segment; anterior cingulate cortex; prefrontal cortex; nucleus accumbens; caudate nucleus; amygdala / Top expressed in: superior frontal gyrus; dentate gyrus of hippocampal formation granule cell; primary visual cortex; ankle joint; cerebellar cortex; neural layer of retina; granulocyte; medial dorsal nucleus; lateral geniculate nucleus; central gray substance of midbrain; More reference expression data
BioGPS	More reference expression data
Gene ontology
Molecular function	transferase activity; protein phosphatase activator activity; glucuronosyltransferase activity; metal ion binding; protein binding; galactosylgalactosylxylosylprotein 3-beta-glucuronosyltransferase activity
Cellular component	integral component of membrane; Golgi apparatus; membrane; cis-Golgi network; extracellular exosome; Golgi membrane
Biological process	positive regulation of intracellular protein transport; glycosaminoglycan metabolic process; heparan sulfate proteoglycan biosynthetic process; positive regulation of catalytic activity; protein glycosylation; glycosaminoglycan biosynthetic process; chondroitin sulfate proteoglycan biosynthetic process; dermatan sulfate proteoglycan biosynthetic process; chondroitin sulfate metabolic process; carbohydrate metabolic process; regulation of phosphoprotein phosphatase activity
Sources:Amigo / QuickGO
Orthologs
Databases	NCBI: entry; OMA: entry
Species	Human	Mouse
Entrez	26229	72727
Ensembl	ENSG00000149541	ENSMUSG00000071649
UniProt	O94766	P58158
RefSeq (mRNA)	NM_001288721; NM_001288722; NM_001288723; NM_012200	NM_024256
RefSeq (protein)	NP_001275650; NP_001275651; NP_001275652; NP_036332	NP_077218
Location (UCSC)	Chr 11: 62.62 – 62.62 Mb	Chr 19: 8.9 – 8.9 Mb
PubMed search
- Wikidata
View/Edit Human	View/Edit Mouse

Beta-1,3-Glucuronyltransferase 3 is an enzyme that in humans is encoded by the B3GAT3 gene.

The protein encoded by this gene is a member of the glucuronyltransferase gene family, enzymes that exhibit strict acceptor specificity, recognizing nonreducing terminal sugars and their anomeric linkages. This gene product catalyzes the formation of the glycosaminoglycan-protein linkage by way of a glucuronyl transfer reaction in the final step of the biosynthesis of the linkage region of proteoglycans.
