= UGT2B10 =

Protein-coding gene in the species Homo sapiens

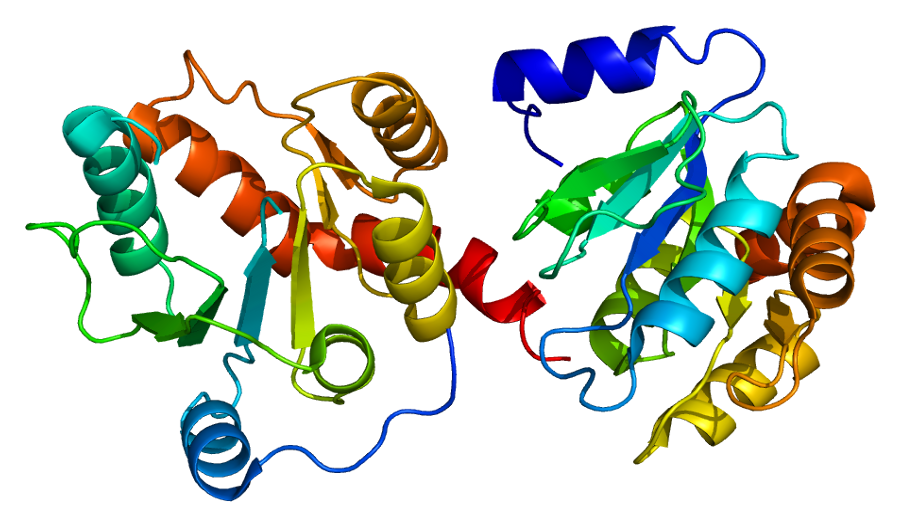

Identifiers
- Aliases: UGT2B10, UDPGT2B10, UDP glucuronosyltransferase family 2 member B10
- External IDs: OMIM: 600070; MGI: 2140962; GeneCards: UGT2B10
Enzyme activity
EC #	BRENDA	ExPASy	KEGG	MetaCyc
2.4.1.17	↗	↗	↗	↗

Gene location (Human)
Chr.	Chromosome 4 (human)
Band	4q13.2	Start	68,815,994 bp
Band	4q13.2	End	68,832,023 bp

Gene location (Mouse)
Chr.	Chromosome 5 (mouse)
Band	5|5 E1	Start	87,037,626 bp
Band	5|5 E1	End	87,054,796 bp
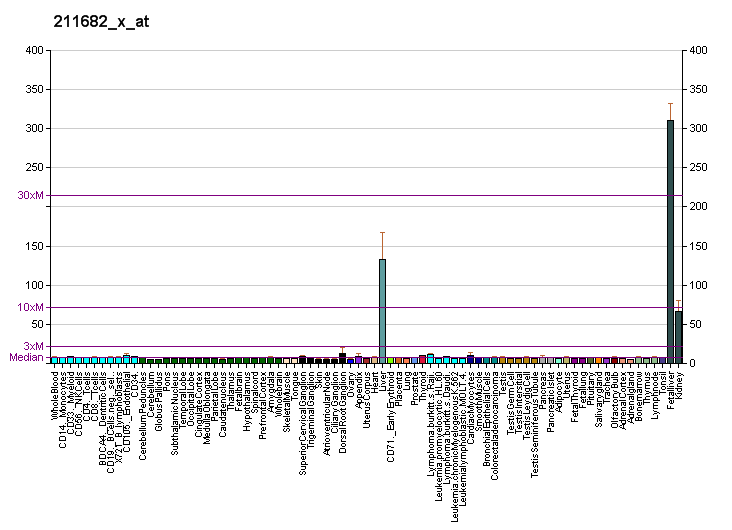
RNA expression pattern
Bgee	Human / Mouse (ortholog); Top expressed in: liver; right lobe of liver; testicle; gallbladder; rectum; mucosa of transverse colon; islet of Langerhans; kidney; renal cortex; left testis / Top expressed in: left lobe of liver; pyloric antrum; mucous cell of stomach; left colon; jejunum; duodenum; migratory enteric neural crest cell; epithelium of stomach; ileum; gallbladder; More reference expression data
BioGPS	More reference expression data
Gene ontology
Molecular function	glycosyltransferase activity; transferase activity; hexosyltransferase activity; glucuronosyltransferase activity; UDP-glycosyltransferase activity
Cellular component	integral component of membrane; organelle membrane; endoplasmic reticulum membrane; intracellular membrane-bounded organelle; endoplasmic reticulum; membrane
Biological process	metabolism; lipid metabolism
Sources:Amigo / QuickGO
Orthologs
Databases	NCBI: entry; OMA: entry
Species	Human	Mouse
Entrez	7365	100727
Ensembl	ENSG00000275190; ENSG00000109181	ENSMUSG00000029260
UniProt	P36537	n/a
RefSeq (mRNA)	NM_001290091; NM_001075; NM_001144767	NM_153598
RefSeq (protein)	NP_001066; NP_001138239; NP_001277020	n/a
Location (UCSC)	Chr 4: 68.82 – 68.83 Mb	Chr 5: 87.04 – 87.05 Mb
PubMed search
- Wikidata
View/Edit Human	View/Edit Mouse

UDP-glucuronosyltransferase 2B10 is an enzyme that in humans is encoded by the UGT2B10 gene. It is responsible for glucuronidation of nicotine and cotinine. Due to common hypomorphic alleles of UGT2B10, glucuronidation contributes relatively little to nicotine metabolism in most people.

== See also ==
- UGT2B17
