= UGT2A2 =

Protein-coding gene in the species Homo sapiens

Identifiers
- Aliases: UGT2A2, UDP glucuronosyltransferase family 2 member A2, UDPGT 2A2
- External IDs: MGI: 3576095; GeneCards: UGT2A2

Gene location (Human)
Chr.	Chromosome 4 (human)
Band	4q13.3	Start	69,588,417 bp
Band	4q13.3	End	69,639,642 bp

Gene location (Mouse)
Chr.	Chromosome 5 (mouse)
Band	5|5 E1	Start	87,607,349 bp
Band	5|5 E1	End	87,630,119 bp
RNA expression pattern
Bgee	Human / Mouse (ortholog); Top expressed in: testicle; olfactory zone of nasal mucosa; right lobe of liver; anterior pituitary; human kidney; renal cortex; skin of abdomen; skin of leg; vagina; wall of uterus / Top expressed in: respiratory epithelium; olfactory epithelium; duodenum; hepatobiliary system; liver; jejunum; olfactory bulb; integument; skin; human kidney; More reference expression data
BioGPS	n/a
Gene ontology
Molecular function	glycosyltransferase activity; transferase activity; glucuronosyltransferase activity; hexosyltransferase activity; UDP-glycosyltransferase activity
Cellular component	integral component of membrane; intracellular membrane-bounded organelle; membrane
Biological process	sensory perception of smell; detection of chemical stimulus; cellular glucuronidation; response to stimulus; metabolism
Sources:Amigo / QuickGO
Orthologs
Databases	NCBI: entry; OMA: entry
Species	Human	Mouse
Entrez	574537	552899
Ensembl	ENSG00000271271	ENSMUSG00000029268
UniProt	Q9Y4X1	Q6PDD0
RefSeq (mRNA)	NM_001301233; NM_001105677	NM_001024148
RefSeq (protein)	NP_001099147; NP_001288162; NP_001239203; NP_001239204; NP_001288168 NP_006789	NP_001019319
Location (UCSC)	Chr 4: 69.59 – 69.64 Mb	Chr 5: 87.61 – 87.63 Mb
PubMed search
- Wikidata
View/Edit Human	View/Edit Mouse

UDP glucuronosyltransferase 2 family, polypeptide A2, also known as UGT2A2, is an enzyme that in humans is encoded by the UGT2A2 gene.

== Function ==
The olfactory neuroepithelium, which lines the posterior nasal cavity, is exposed to a wide range of odorants and airborne toxic compounds. Odorants, which are mostly small lipophilic molecules, enter the mucus flow and reach the odorant receptors on sensory neurons. Odorant sensing is generally a transient process, requiring an effective signal termination, which could be provided by biotransformation of the odorant in the epithelial supporting cells. Xenobiotic-metabolizing enzymes in the olfactory epithelium have been suggested to catalyze inactivation and facilitate elimination of odorants. UGT2A1 and UGT2A2 were recently implicated as having a role in the loss of smell symptom associated with COVID-19.
