= UGT1A5 =

Protein-coding gene in the species Homo sapiens

Identifiers
- Aliases: UGT1A5, UDPGT, UDPGT 1-5, UGT1E, UDP glucuronosyltransferase family 1 member A5
- External IDs: OMIM: 606430; GeneCards: UGT1A5
Enzyme activity
EC #	BRENDA	ExPASy	KEGG	MetaCyc
2.4.1.17	↗	↗	↗	↗

Gene location (Human)
Chr.	Chromosome 2 (human)
Band	2q37.1	Start	233,712,907 bp
Band	2q37.1	End	233,773,300 bp
RNA expression pattern
Bgee	Human / Mouse (ortholog); Top expressed in: kidney; duodenum; small intestine; liver; colon; stomach; right lobe of liver / n/a; More reference expression data
BioGPS	n/a
Gene ontology
Molecular function	glycosyltransferase activity; transferase activity; glucuronosyltransferase activity; hexosyltransferase activity; UDP-glycosyltransferase activity
Cellular component	integral component of membrane; membrane; endoplasmic reticulum; endoplasmic reticulum membrane; intracellular membrane-bounded organelle
Biological process	metabolism; xenobiotic glucuronidation; flavonoid glucuronidation
Sources:Amigo / QuickGO
Orthologs
Databases	NCBI: entry; OMA: entry
Species	Human	Mouse
Entrez	54579	n/a
Ensembl	ENSG00000288705	n/a
UniProt	P35504	n/a
RefSeq (mRNA)	NM_019078	n/a
RefSeq (protein)	NP_061951	n/a
Location (UCSC)	Chr 2: 233.71 – 233.77 Mb	n/a
PubMed search		n/a
- Wikidata
View/Edit Human

UDP-glucuronosyltransferase 1-5 is an enzyme that in humans is encoded by the UGT1A5 gene.

== Function ==
This gene encodes a UDP-glucuronosyltransferase, an enzyme of the glucuronidation pathway that transforms small lipophilic molecules, such as steroids, bilirubin, hormones, and drugs, into water-soluble, excretable metabolites. This gene is part of a complex locus that encodes several UDP-glucuronosyltransferases. The locus includes thirteen unique alternate first exons followed by four common exons. Four of the alternate first exons are considered pseudogenes. Each of the remaining nine 5' exons may be spliced to the four common exons, resulting in nine proteins with different N-termini and identical C-termini. Each first exon encodes the substrate binding site and is regulated by its own promoter.
