= UGT1A =

Gene in the species Homo sapiens

Identifiers
- Aliases: UGT1A, GNT1, UGT, UGT1, UGT1A@, UDP glucuronosyltransferase family 1 member A complex locus
- External IDs: GeneCards: UGT1A
Orthologs
Databases	NCBI: entry
Species	Human	Mouse
Entrez	7361	n/a
Ensembl	n/a	n/a
UniProt	n a	n/a
RefSeq (mRNA)	n/a	n/a
RefSeq (protein)	n/a	n/a
Location (UCSC)	n/a	n/a
PubMed search		n/a
- Wikidata
View/Edit Human

UDP glucuronosyltransferase 1 family, polypeptide A cluster (UGT1A) is a human gene locus that includes several UDP glucuronosyltransferases.

The UGT1A locus includes thirteen unique alternate first exons followed by four common exons. Four of the alternate first exons are considered pseudogenes. Each of the remaining nine 5' exons may be spliced to the four common exons, resulting in nine proteins with different N-termini and identical C-termini. Each first exon encodes the substrate binding site, and is regulated by its promoter.
