= B3GAT2 =

Protein-coding gene in the species Homo sapiens

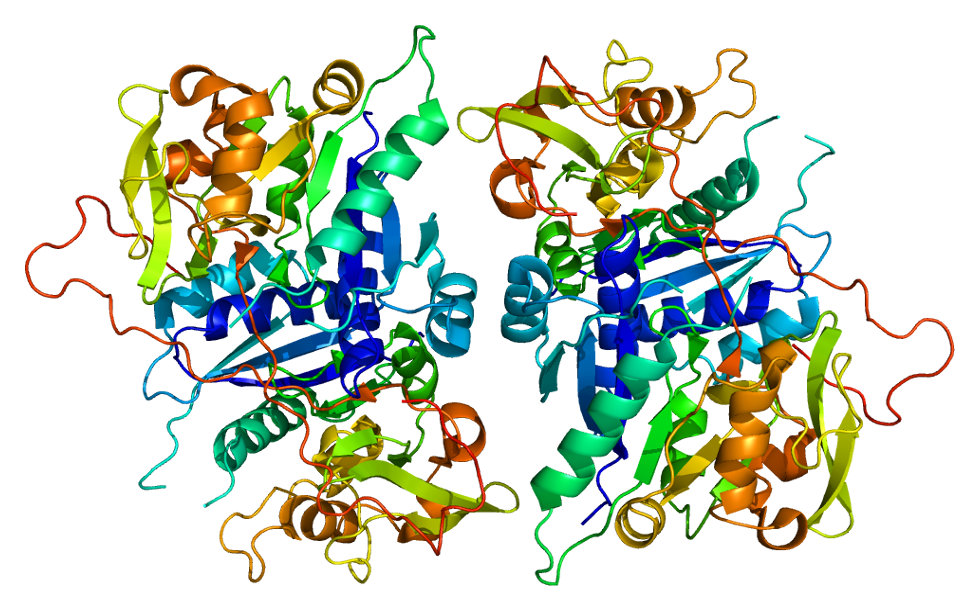

Identifiers
- Aliases: B3GAT2, GLCATS, beta-1,3-glucuronyltransferase 2
- External IDs: OMIM: 607497; MGI: 2389490; GeneCards: B3GAT2
Available structures
PDB	Ortholog search: PDBe RCSB
PDB	List of PDB id codes 2D0J
Enzyme activity
EC #	BRENDA	ExPASy	KEGG	MetaCyc
2.4.1.135	↗	↗	↗	↗

Gene location (Human)
Chr.	Chromosome 6 (human)
Band	6q13	Start	70,856,679 bp
Band	6q13	End	70,957,060 bp

Gene location (Mouse)
Chr.	Chromosome 1 (mouse)
Band	1|1 A5	Start	23,800,834 bp
Band	1|1 A5	End	23,888,239 bp
RNA expression pattern
Bgee	Human / Mouse (ortholog); Top expressed in: ventricular zone; entorhinal cortex; ganglionic eminence; buccal mucosa cell; pons; Brodmann area 46; postcentral gyrus; hippocampus proper; endothelial cell; corpus callosum / Top expressed in: proximal tubule; right kidney; ventricular zone; urethra; human kidney; zygote; dentate gyrus of hippocampal formation granule cell; primary visual cortex; superior frontal gyrus; neural tube; More reference expression data
BioGPS	n/a
Gene ontology
Molecular function	transferase activity; metal ion binding; galactosylgalactosylxylosylprotein 3-beta-glucuronosyltransferase activity
Cellular component	integral component of membrane; Golgi apparatus; membrane; Golgi membrane
Biological process	glycosaminoglycan metabolic process; protein glycosylation; chondroitin sulfate proteoglycan biosynthetic process; chondroitin sulfate metabolic process; carbohydrate metabolic process
Sources:Amigo / QuickGO
Orthologs
Databases	NCBI: entry; OMA: entry
Species	Human	Mouse
Entrez	135152	280645
Ensembl	ENSG00000112309	ENSMUSG00000026156
UniProt	Q9NPZ5	P59270
RefSeq (mRNA)	NM_080742	NM_172124
RefSeq (protein)	NP_542780	NP_742122
Location (UCSC)	Chr 6: 70.86 – 70.96 Mb	Chr 1: 23.8 – 23.89 Mb
PubMed search
- Wikidata
View/Edit Human	View/Edit Mouse

Galactosylgalactosylxylosylprotein 3-beta-glucuronosyltransferase 2 is an enzyme that in humans is encoded by the B3GAT2 gene.

The product of this gene is a transmembrane protein belonging to the glucuronyltransferase family, and catalyzes the transfer of a beta-1,3 linked glucuronic acid to a terminal galactose in different glycoproteins or glycolipids containing a Gal-beta-1-4GlcNAc or Gal-beta-1-3GlcNAc residue. The encoded protein is involved in the synthesis of the human natural killer-1 (HNK-1) carbohydrate epitope, a sulfated trisaccharide implicated in cellular migration and adhesion in the nervous system.

== Use of HNK-1 Antibody for Neural Crest Research ==
Antibodies raised against the HNK-1 epitope have played a large role in studies of the neural crest, especially in the avian embryo. The first antibody raised against this epitope was NC-1, which permitted much easier analyses of neural crest migration pathways. In avians, and especially in other vertebrates, the results of HNK-1 staining should be interpreted with caution as the epitope is not unique to the neural crest.
