= UGT1A7 =

Protein-coding gene in the species Homo sapiens

Identifiers
- Aliases: UGT1A7, UDPGT, UDPGT 1-7, UGT-1G, UGT1-07, UGT1.7, UGT1G, UDP glucuronosyltransferase family 1 member A7, UGT1-01, UGT-1A, UGT1.1, hUG-BR1, UGT1A, UGT1, GNT1, UGT1A1
- External IDs: OMIM: 606432; MGI: 3576092; GeneCards: UGT1A7
Enzyme activity
EC #	BRENDA	ExPASy	KEGG	MetaCyc
2.4.1.17	↗	↗	↗	↗

Gene location (Human)
Chr.	Chromosome 2 (human)
Band	2q37.1	Start	233,681,901 bp
Band	2q37.1	End	233,773,300 bp

Gene location (Mouse)
Chr.	Chromosome 1 (mouse)
Band	1|1 D	Start	87,998,522 bp
Band	1|1 D	End	88,146,719 bp
RNA expression pattern
Bgee	Human / Mouse (ortholog); Top expressed in: testicle; vagina; mucosa of transverse colon; left adrenal cortex; right adrenal cortex; tonsil; skin of abdomen; liver; right lobe of liver; skin of leg / Top expressed in: hepatobiliary system; liver; duodenum; embryo; colon; renal cortex; proximal tubule; stomach; human kidney; ileum; More reference expression data
BioGPS	n/a
Gene ontology
Molecular function	transferase activity; enzyme inhibitor activity; retinoic acid binding; hexosyltransferase activity; protein homodimerization activity; glycosyltransferase activity; glucuronosyltransferase activity; protein heterodimerization activity; enzyme binding; protein kinase C binding; UDP-glycosyltransferase activity
Cellular component	integral component of membrane; endoplasmic reticulum membrane; membrane; intracellular membrane-bounded organelle; endoplasmic reticulum
Biological process	excretion; coumarin metabolic process; retinoic acid metabolic process; negative regulation of cellular glucuronidation; fatty acid metabolic process; cellular glucuronidation; flavonoid glucuronidation; xenobiotic glucuronidation; flavone metabolic process; metabolism; negative regulation of glucuronosyltransferase activity; negative regulation of fatty acid metabolic process; negative regulation of catalytic activity
Sources:Amigo / QuickGO
Orthologs
Databases	NCBI: entry; OMA: entry
Species	Human	Mouse
Entrez	54577	394434
Ensembl	ENSG00000244122	ENSMUSG00000090175
UniProt	Q9HAW7	Q62452
RefSeq (mRNA)	NM_019077	NM_201644
RefSeq (protein)	NP_061950	NP_964006
Location (UCSC)	Chr 2: 233.68 – 233.77 Mb	Chr 1: 88 – 88.15 Mb
PubMed search
- Wikidata
View/Edit Human	View/Edit Mouse

UDP glucuronosyltransferase 1 family, polypeptide A7 is a protein that in humans is encoded by the UGT1A7 gene.

This gene encodes a UDP-glucuronosyltransferase, an enzyme of the glucuronidation pathway that transforms small lipophilic molecules, such as steroids, bilirubin, hormones, and drugs, into water-soluble, excretable metabolites. This gene is part of a complex locus that encodes several UDP-glucuronosyltransferases. The locus includes thirteen unique alternate first exons followed by four common exons. Four of the alternate first exons are considered pseudogenes. Each of the remaining nine 5' exons may be spliced to the four common exons, resulting in nine proteins with different N-termini and identical C-termini. Each first exon encodes the substrate binding site, and is regulated by its own promoter. The enzyme encoded by this gene has moderate glucuronidase activity with phenols. [provided by RefSeq, Jul 2008].
