= UGT2B15 =

Protein-coding gene in the species Homo sapiens

Identifiers
- Aliases: UGT2B15, HLUG4, UDPGT 2B8, UDPGT2B15, UDPGTH3, UGT2B8, UDP glucuronosyltransferase family 2 member B15
- External IDs: OMIM: 600069; MGI: 1919023; GeneCards: UGT2B15
Enzyme activity
EC #	BRENDA	ExPASy	KEGG	MetaCyc
2.4.1.17	↗	↗	↗	↗

Gene location (Human)
Chr.	Chromosome 4 (human)
Band	4q13.2	Start	68,646,597 bp
Band	4q13.2	End	68,670,652 bp

Gene location (Mouse)
Chr.	Chromosome 5 (mouse)
Band	5|5 E1	Start	87,064,497 bp
Band	5|5 E1	End	87,074,389 bp
RNA expression pattern
Bgee	Human / Mouse (ortholog); Top expressed in: gallbladder; liver; right lobe of liver; gonad; islet of Langerhans; duodenum; mucosa of transverse colon; body of pancreas; body of stomach; rectum / Top expressed in: left lobe of liver; embryo; lumbar subsegment of spinal cord; right ventricle; tibiofemoral joint; sexually immature organism; medial head of gastrocnemius muscle; lumbar spinal ganglion; stria vascularis; carotid body; More reference expression data
BioGPS	n/a
Gene ontology
Molecular function	hexosyltransferase activity; glucuronosyltransferase activity; glycosyltransferase activity; transferase activity; retinoic acid binding; UDP-glycosyltransferase activity
Cellular component	endoplasmic reticulum membrane; membrane; intracellular membrane-bounded organelle; integral component of membrane; organelle membrane; endoplasmic reticulum
Biological process	steroid metabolic process; cellular glucuronidation; metabolism; xenobiotic metabolic process
Sources:Amigo / QuickGO
Orthologs
Databases	NCBI: entry; OMA: entry
Species	Human	Mouse
Entrez	7366	71773
Ensembl	ENSG00000277132; ENSG00000196620	ENSMUSG00000035836
UniProt	P54855	Q8R084
RefSeq (mRNA)	NM_001076	NM_152811
RefSeq (protein)	NP_001067	NP_690024
Location (UCSC)	Chr 4: 68.65 – 68.67 Mb	Chr 5: 87.06 – 87.07 Mb
PubMed search
- Wikidata
View/Edit Human	View/Edit Mouse

UDP-glucuronosyltransferase 2B15 is an enzyme that in humans is encoded by the UGT2B15 gene.

The UGTs are of major importance in the conjugation and subsequent elimination of potentially toxic xenobiotics and endogenous compounds. UGT2B8 demonstrates reactivity with estriol. See UGT2B4 (MIM 600067).[supplied by OMIM]
