= UGT1A3 =

Protein-coding gene in the species Homo sapiens

Identifiers
- Aliases: UGT1A3, UDPGT, UDPGT 1-3, UGT-1C, UGT1-03, UGT1.3, UGT1C, UGT1A3S, UDP glucuronosyltransferase family 1 member A3
- External IDs: OMIM: 606428; MGI: 3576049; GeneCards: UGT1A3
Enzyme activity
| EC # | BRENDA | ExPASy | KEGG | MetaCyc |
|---|---|---|---|---|
| 2.4.1.17 | ↗ | ↗ | ↗ | ↗ |

Gene location (Human)
| Chr. | Chromosome 2 (human) |
| Band | 2q37.1 | Start | 233,729,042 bp |
| Band | 2q37.1 | End | 233,773,300 bp |

Gene location (Mouse)
| Chr. | Chromosome 1 (mouse) |
| Band | 1|1 D | Start | 88,128,323 bp |
| Band | 1|1 D | End | 88,146,719 bp |
RNA expression pattern
| Bgee | Human / Mouse (ortholog); Top expressed in: liver; right lobe of liver; muscle tissue; kidney; small intestine; duodenum; colon / Top expressed in: right kidney; human kidney; granulocyte; renal cortex; liver; duodenum; lip; uterus; bone marrow; proximal tubule; More reference expression data |
| BioGPS | n/a |
Gene ontology
| Molecular function | transferase activity; retinoic acid binding; hexosyltransferase activity; protein homodimerization activity; glycosyltransferase activity; glucuronosyltransferase activity; protein heterodimerization activity; enzyme binding; UDP-glycosyltransferase activity |
| Cellular component | integral component of membrane; endoplasmic reticulum membrane; membrane; intracellular membrane-bounded organelle; endoplasmic reticulum |
| Biological process | retinoic acid metabolic process; negative regulation of cellular glucuronidation; cellular glucuronidation; flavonoid glucuronidation; xenobiotic glucuronidation; negative regulation of glucuronosyltransferase activity; negative regulation of fatty acid metabolic process; metabolism |
Sources:Amigo / QuickGO
Orthologs
| Databases | NCBI: entry; OMA: entry |
| Species | Human | Mouse |
| Entrez | 54659 | 22236 |
| Ensembl | ENSG00000288702 | ENSMUSG00000090171 |
| UniProt | P35503 | P70691 |
| RefSeq (mRNA) | NM_019093 | NM_013701 |
| RefSeq (protein) | NP_061966 | NP_038729 |
| Location (UCSC) | Chr 2: 233.73 – 233.77 Mb | Chr 1: 88.13 – 88.15 Mb |
| PubMed search |
- Wikidata
| View/Edit Human | View/Edit Mouse |

UDP-glucuronosyltransferase 1-3 is an enzyme that in humans is encoded by the UGT1A3 gene.

This gene encodes a UDP-glucuronosyltransferase, an enzyme of the glucuronidation pathway that transforms small lipophilic molecules, such as steroids, bilirubin, hormones, and drugs, into water-soluble, excretable metabolites. This gene is part of a complex locus that encodes several UDP-glucuronosyltransferases. The locus includes thirteen unique alternate first exons followed by four common exons. Four of the alternate first exons are considered pseudogenes. Each of the remaining nine 5' exons may be spliced to the four common exons, resulting in nine proteins with different N-termini and identical C-termini. Each first exon encodes the substrate binding site, and is regulated by its own promoter. Substrates of this enzyme include estrone, 2-hydroxyestrone, and metabolites of benzo(a)pyrene.
