= UGT2B4 =

Protein-coding gene in the species Homo sapiens

Identifiers
- Aliases: UGT2B4, HLUG25, UDPGT2B4, UDPGTH1, UDPGTh-1, UGT2B11, UDP glucuronosyltransferase family 2 member B4
- External IDs: OMIM: 600067; MGI: 1919023; GeneCards: UGT2B4
Enzyme activity
EC #	BRENDA	ExPASy	KEGG	MetaCyc
2.4.1.17	↗	↗	↗	↗

Gene location (Human)
Chr.	Chromosome 4 (human)
Band	4q13.3	Start	69,480,165 bp
Band	4q13.3	End	69,526,014 bp

Gene location (Mouse)
Chr.	Chromosome 5 (mouse)
Band	5|5 E1	Start	87,064,497 bp
Band	5|5 E1	End	87,074,389 bp
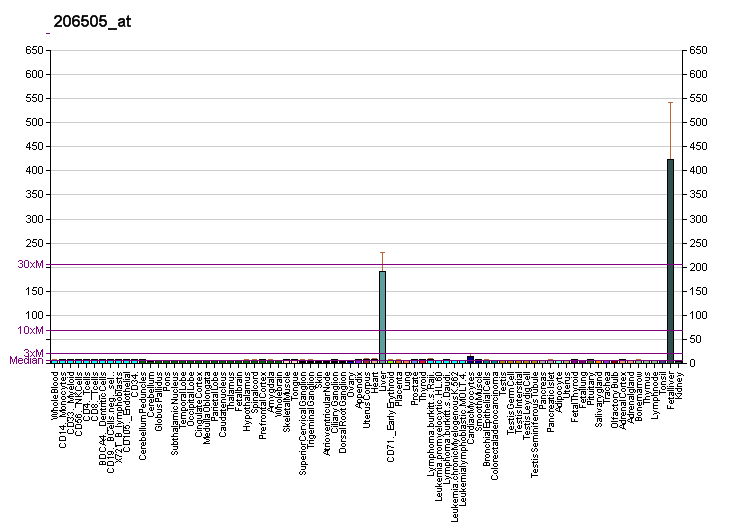
RNA expression pattern
Bgee	Human / Mouse (ortholog); Top expressed in: liver; right lobe of liver; gonad; testicle; left ventricle; right auricle of heart; right ventricle; myocardium; islet of Langerhans; myocardium of left ventricle / Top expressed in: left lobe of liver; embryo; lumbar subsegment of spinal cord; right ventricle; tibiofemoral joint; sexually immature organism; medial head of gastrocnemius muscle; lumbar spinal ganglion; stria vascularis; carotid body; More reference expression data
BioGPS	More reference expression data
Gene ontology
Molecular function	glycosyltransferase activity; transferase activity; glucuronosyltransferase activity; retinoic acid binding; hexosyltransferase activity; UDP-glycosyltransferase activity
Cellular component	integral component of membrane; organelle membrane; endoplasmic reticulum membrane; intracellular membrane-bounded organelle; endoplasmic reticulum; membrane
Biological process	cellular glucuronidation; metabolism
Sources:Amigo / QuickGO
Orthologs
Databases	NCBI: entry; OMA: entry
Species	Human	Mouse
Entrez	7363	71773
Ensembl	ENSG00000156096	ENSMUSG00000035836
UniProt	P06133	Q8R084
RefSeq (mRNA)	NM_001297615; NM_001297616; NM_021139	NM_152811
RefSeq (protein)	NP_001284544; NP_001284545; NP_066962	NP_690024
Location (UCSC)	Chr 4: 69.48 – 69.53 Mb	Chr 5: 87.06 – 87.07 Mb
PubMed search
- Wikidata
View/Edit Human	View/Edit Mouse

UDP glucuronosyltransferase 2 family, polypeptide B4, also known as UGT2B4, is an enzyme that in humans is encoded by the UGT2B4 gene.

== Function ==
UGT2B4 is mainly involved in the glucuronidation of hyodeoxycholic acid, a bile acid, and catechol-estrogens, such as 17-epiestriol and 4-hydroxy-estrone.

The expression of the UGT2B4 enzyme is upregulated by the farnesoid X receptor (FXR), a nuclear receptor which is activated by bile acids. These same bile acids are substrates for the UGT2B4 enzyme. Hence upregulation of UGT2B4 by activated FXR provides a mechanism for the detection, conjugation and subsequent elimination of toxic bile acids.
