= UGT1A9 =

Protein-coding gene in the species Homo sapiens

Identifiers
- Aliases: UGT1A9, HLUGP4, LUGP4, UDPGT, UDPGT 1-9, UGT-1I, UGT1-09, UGT1-9, UGT1.9, UGT1AI, UGT1I, UGT1A9S, UDP glucuronosyltransferase family 1 member A9
- External IDs: OMIM: 606434; MGI: 3580642; GeneCards: UGT1A9
Enzyme activity
EC #	BRENDA	ExPASy	KEGG	MetaCyc
2.4.1.17	↗	↗	↗	↗

Gene location (Human)
Chr.	Chromosome 2 (human)
Band	2q37.1	Start	233,671,898 bp
Band	2q37.1	End	233,773,300 bp

Gene location (Mouse)
Chr.	Chromosome 1 (mouse)
Band	1|1 D	Start	87,983,110 bp
Band	1|1 D	End	88,146,726 bp
RNA expression pattern
Bgee	Human / Mouse (ortholog); Top expressed in: right lobe of liver; renal cortex; human kidney; mucosa of transverse colon; rectum; urinary bladder; olfactory zone of nasal mucosa; duodenum; body of stomach; islet of Langerhans / Top expressed in: renal cortex; nephron; proximal tubule; renal medulla; human kidney; hair; renal pelvis; metanephros; lateral recess; right kidney; More reference expression data
BioGPS	n/a
Gene ontology
Molecular function	transferase activity; enzyme inhibitor activity; retinoic acid binding; hexosyltransferase activity; protein homodimerization activity; glycosyltransferase activity; glucuronosyltransferase activity; protein heterodimerization activity; enzyme binding; UDP-glycosyltransferase activity
Cellular component	integral component of membrane; endoplasmic reticulum membrane; membrane; intracellular membrane-bounded organelle; endoplasmic reticulum
Biological process	retinoic acid metabolic process; negative regulation of cellular glucuronidation; cellular glucuronidation; flavonoid glucuronidation; xenobiotic glucuronidation; flavone metabolic process; xenobiotic metabolic process; negative regulation of glucuronosyltransferase activity; negative regulation of fatty acid metabolic process; regulation of lipid metabolic process; metabolism
Sources:Amigo / QuickGO
Orthologs
Databases	NCBI: entry; OMA: entry
Species	Human	Mouse
Entrez	54600	394430
Ensembl	ENSG00000241119	ENSMUSG00000090165
UniProt	O60656	n/a
RefSeq (mRNA)	NM_021027	NM_201641
RefSeq (protein)	NP_066307	n/a
Location (UCSC)	Chr 2: 233.67 – 233.77 Mb	Chr 1: 87.98 – 88.15 Mb
PubMed search
- Wikidata
View/Edit Human	View/Edit Mouse

UDP-glucuronosyltransferase 1-9 is an enzyme that in humans is encoded by the UGT1A9 gene.

== Function ==
This gene encodes a UDP-glucuronosyltransferase, an enzyme of the glucuronidation pathway that transforms small lipophilic molecules, such as steroids, bilirubin, hormones, and drugs, into water-soluble, excretable metabolites. This gene is part of a complex locus that encodes several UDP-glucuronosyltransferases. The locus includes thirteen unique alternate first exons followed by four common exons. Four of the alternate first exons are considered pseudogenes. Each of the remaining nine 5′ exons may be spliced to the four common exons, resulting in nine proteins with different N-termini and identical C-termini. Each first exon encodes the substrate binding site, and is regulated by its own promoter. The enzyme encoded by this gene is active on phenols.

== Interactive pathway map ==
Click on genes, proteins and metabolites below to link to respective articles. (Note: The interactive pathway map can be edited at WikiPathways: "IrinotecanPathway_WP229".)

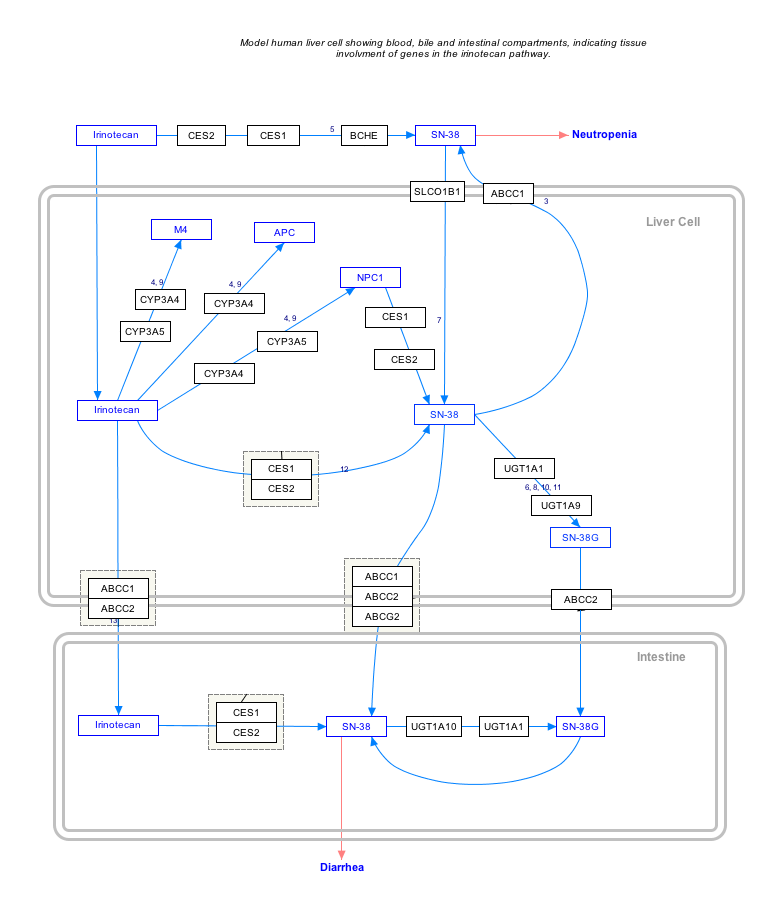

Irinotecan Pathway edit

== Inhibitors ==
BI-3231, an inhibitor of HSD17B13, was also found to inhibit UGT1A9.
