= UGT1A4 =

Enzyme and protein-coding gene in humans

Identifiers
- Aliases: UGT1A4, HUG-BR2, UDPGT, UDPGT 1-4, UGT-1D, UGT1-04, UGT1.4, UGT1D, UGT1A4S, UDP glucuronosyltransferase family 1 member A4, UGT1-01, UGT-1A, UGT1A, hUG-BR1, UGT1, GNT1, UGT1.1, UGT1A1
- External IDs: OMIM: 606429; MGI: 3032634; GeneCards: UGT1A4
Enzyme activity
EC #	BRENDA	ExPASy	KEGG	MetaCyc
2.4.1.17	↗	↗	↗	↗

Gene location (Human)
Chr.	Chromosome 2 (human)
Band	2q37.1	Start	233,718,736 bp
Band	2q37.1	End	233,773,300 bp

Gene location (Mouse)
Chr.	Chromosome 1 (mouse)
Band	1|1 D	Start	88,093,734 bp
Band	1|1 D	End	88,146,719 bp
RNA expression pattern
Bgee	Human / Mouse (ortholog); Top expressed in: right lobe of liver; duodenum; gallbladder; mucosa of transverse colon; human kidney; olfactory zone of nasal mucosa; urinary bladder; mucosa of esophagus; renal cortex; zone of skin / Top expressed in: hepatobiliary system; liver; granulocyte; urinary bladder; uterus; mouth; lip; spleen; colon; human kidney; More reference expression data
BioGPS	n/a
Gene ontology
Molecular function	transferase activity; retinoic acid binding; hexosyltransferase activity; protein homodimerization activity; glycosyltransferase activity; protein heterodimerization activity; enzyme binding; glucuronosyltransferase activity; UDP-glycosyltransferase activity
Cellular component	integral component of membrane; endoplasmic reticulum membrane; membrane; intracellular membrane-bounded organelle; endoplasmic reticulum
Biological process	negative regulation of cellular glucuronidation; heme catabolic process; cellular glucuronidation; xenobiotic glucuronidation; metabolism; negative regulation of glucuronosyltransferase activity; negative regulation of fatty acid metabolic process; bilirubin conjugation; flavonoid glucuronidation
Sources:Amigo / QuickGO
Orthologs
Databases	NCBI: entry; OMA: entry
Species	Human	Mouse
Entrez	54657	394433
Ensembl	ENSG00000244474	ENSMUSG00000089943
UniProt	P22310	n/a
RefSeq (mRNA)	NM_007120	NM_201643
RefSeq (protein)	NP_009051	n/a
Location (UCSC)	Chr 2: 233.72 – 233.77 Mb	Chr 1: 88.09 – 88.15 Mb
PubMed search
- Wikidata
View/Edit Human	View/Edit Mouse

UDP-glucuronosyltransferase 1-4 is an enzyme that in humans is encoded by the UGT1A4 gene.

This gene encodes a UDP-glucuronosyltransferase, an enzyme of the glucuronidation pathway that transforms small lipophilic molecules, such as steroids, bilirubin, hormones, and drugs, into water-soluble, excretable metabolites. This gene is part of a complex locus that encodes several UDP-glucuronosyltransferases. The locus includes thirteen unique alternate first exons followed by four common exons. Four of the alternate first exons are considered pseudogenes. Each of the remaining nine 5′ exons may be spliced to the four common exons, resulting in nine proteins with different N-termini and identical C-termini. Each first exon encodes the substrate binding site, and is regulated by its own promoter. This enzyme has some glucuronidase activity towards bilirubin, although it is more active on amines, steroids, and sapogenins.

It is the main enzyme responsible for glucuronidation of the anticonvulsant lamotrigine.
