= UGT1A6 =

Protein-coding gene in the species Homo sapiens

Identifiers
- Aliases: UGT1A6, GNT1, HLUGP, HLUGP1, UDPGT, UDPGT 1-6, UGT1, UGT1A6S, UGT1F, UDP glucuronosyltransferase family 1 member A6, UGT1.5, hUG-BR1, UGT1.3, UGT-1C, UGT1A, UGT1E, UGT-1A, UGT-1E, UGT1A3, UGT1A1, UGT1A5, UGT1-01, UGT1C, UGT1-05, UGT1-03, UGT1.1, UGT1.6, UGT1-06, UGT-1F
- External IDs: OMIM: 606431; MGI: 3580629; GeneCards: UGT1A6
Enzyme activity
EC #	BRENDA	ExPASy	KEGG	MetaCyc
2.4.1.17	↗	↗	↗	↗

Gene location (Human)
Chr.	Chromosome 2 (human)
Band	2q37.1	Start	233,691,607 bp
Band	2q37.1	End	233,773,300 bp

Gene location (Mouse)
Chr.	Chromosome 1 (mouse)
Band	1|1 D	Start	88,030,974 bp
Band	1|1 D	End	88,146,725 bp
RNA expression pattern
Bgee	Human / Mouse (ortholog); Top expressed in: liver; right lobe of liver; human kidney; testicle; olfactory zone of nasal mucosa; urinary bladder; skin of abdomen; skin of leg; duodenum; renal cortex / Top expressed in: urinary bladder; white adipose tissue; exocrine gland; hepatobiliary system; liver; kidney tubule; proximal tubule; lateral recess; renal medulla; loop of Henle; More reference expression data
BioGPS	n/a
Gene ontology
Molecular function	transferase activity; retinoic acid binding; hexosyltransferase activity; protein homodimerization activity; glycosyltransferase activity; protein heterodimerization activity; enzyme binding; glucuronosyltransferase activity; UDP-glycosyltransferase activity
Cellular component	integral component of membrane; endoplasmic reticulum membrane; membrane; intracellular membrane-bounded organelle; endoplasmic reticulum
Biological process	negative regulation of cellular glucuronidation; cellular glucuronidation; xenobiotic glucuronidation; metabolism; negative regulation of glucuronosyltransferase activity; negative regulation of fatty acid metabolic process; xenobiotic metabolic process; flavonoid glucuronidation
Sources:Amigo / QuickGO
Orthologs
Databases	NCBI: entry; OMA: entry
Species	Human	Mouse
Entrez	54578	394435
Ensembl	ENSG00000167165	ENSMUSG00000090145
UniProt	P19224	K9J7B2
RefSeq (mRNA)	NM_205862; NM_001072	NM_201410
RefSeq (protein)	NP_001063; NP_995584	NP_958812
Location (UCSC)	Chr 2: 233.69 – 233.77 Mb	Chr 1: 88.03 – 88.15 Mb
PubMed search
- Wikidata
View/Edit Human	View/Edit Mouse

UDP-glucuronosyltransferase 1-6 is an enzyme that in humans is encoded by the UGT1A6 gene.

== Function ==
UDP-glucuronosyltransferase 1-6 is a UDP-glucuronosyltransferase, an enzyme of the glucuronidation pathway that transforms small lipophilic molecules, such as steroids, bilirubin, hormones, and drugs, into water-soluble, excretable metabolites.

This gene is part of a complex locus that encodes several UDP-glucuronosyltransferases. The locus includes thirteen unique alternate first exons followed by four common exons. Four of the alternate first exons are considered pseudogenes. Each of the remaining nine 5' exons may be spliced to the four common exons, resulting in nine proteins with different N-termini and identical C-termini. Each first exon encodes the substrate binding site, and is regulated by its own promoter. The enzyme encoded by this gene is active on phenolic and planar compounds. Alternative splicing in the unique 5' end of this gene results in two transcript variants.

This enzyme is also responsible for the inactivation of popular analgesic drugs, such as aspirin and acetaminophen, by glucuronidation. The loss of a functional UGT1A6 gene in certain hypercarnivores, and particularly cats, renders the animals extremely sensitive to the adverse effects of these analgesics.
