= UGT2B17 =

Protein-coding gene in the species Homo sapiens

Identifiers
- Aliases: UGT2B17, BMND12, UDPGT2B17, UDP glucuronosyltransferase family 2 member B17
- External IDs: OMIM: 601903; MGI: 1919023; GeneCards: UGT2B17
Enzyme activity
EC #	BRENDA	ExPASy	KEGG	MetaCyc
2.4.1.17	↗	↗	↗	↗

Gene location (Human)
Chr.	Chromosome 4 (human)
Band	4q13.2	Start	68,537,173 bp
Band	4q13.2	End	68,576,413 bp

Gene location (Mouse)
Chr.	Chromosome 5 (mouse)
Band	5|5 E1	Start	87,064,497 bp
Band	5|5 E1	End	87,074,389 bp
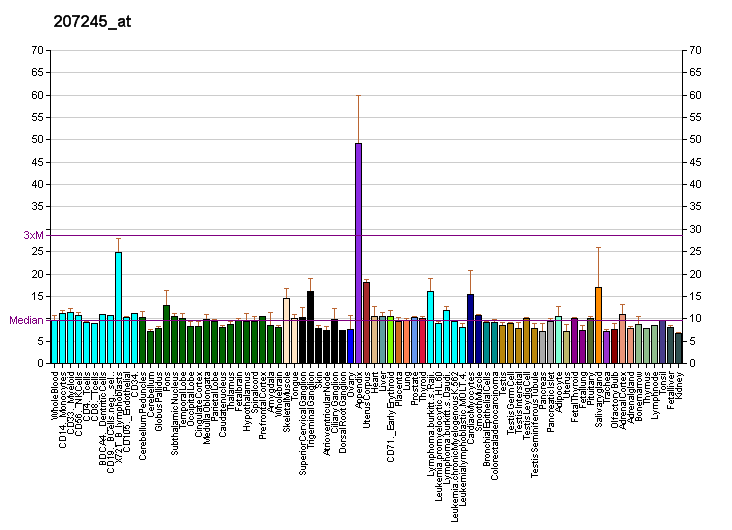
RNA expression pattern
Bgee	Human / Mouse (ortholog); Top expressed in: mucosa of transverse colon; mucosa of ileum; mucosa of sigmoid colon; duodenum; appendix; epithelium of colon; jejunal mucosa; rectum; right lobe of liver; pancreatic epithelial cell / Top expressed in: left lobe of liver; embryo; lumbar subsegment of spinal cord; right ventricle; tibiofemoral joint; sexually immature organism; medial head of gastrocnemius muscle; lumbar spinal ganglion; stria vascularis; carotid body; More reference expression data
BioGPS	More reference expression data
Gene ontology
Molecular function	glycosyltransferase activity; transferase activity; glucuronosyltransferase activity; retinoic acid binding; hexosyltransferase activity; UDP-glycosyltransferase activity
Cellular component	integral component of membrane; organelle membrane; endoplasmic reticulum membrane; membrane; intracellular membrane-bounded organelle; endoplasmic reticulum
Biological process	steroid metabolic process; metabolism; cellular glucuronidation
Sources:Amigo / QuickGO
Orthologs
Databases	NCBI: entry; OMA: entry
Species	Human	Mouse
Entrez	7367	71773
Ensembl	ENSG00000197888	ENSMUSG00000035836
UniProt	O75795	Q8R084
RefSeq (mRNA)	NM_001077	NM_152811
RefSeq (protein)	NP_001068	NP_690024
Location (UCSC)	Chr 4: 68.54 – 68.58 Mb	Chr 5: 87.06 – 87.07 Mb
PubMed search
- Wikidata
View/Edit Human	View/Edit Mouse

UDP-glucuronosyltransferase 2B17 is an enzyme that in humans is encoded by the UGT2B17 gene.

UGT2B17 belongs to the family of UDP-glucuronosyltransferases (UGTs; EC 2.4.1.17), enzymes that catalyze the transfer of glucuronic acid from uridine diphosphoglucuronic acid to a variety of substrates, including steroid hormones.[supplied by OMIM] It also metabolizes 3-hydroxycotinine, which is minor nicotine metabolite
