= UGT1A10 =

Protein-coding gene in the species Homo sapiens

Identifiers
- Aliases: UGT1A10, UDPGT, UGT-1J, UGT1-10, UGT1.10, UGT1J, UDP glucuronosyltransferase family 1 member A10, UGT1-01, UGT-1A, hUG-BR1, UGT1, UGT1A, UGT1.1, GNT1, UGT1A1
- External IDs: OMIM: 606435; MGI: 3576092; GeneCards: UGT1A10
Enzyme activity
EC #	BRENDA	ExPASy	KEGG	MetaCyc
2.4.1.17	↗	↗	↗	↗

Gene location (Human)
Chr.	Chromosome 2 (human)
Band	2q37.1	Start	233,636,448 bp
Band	2q37.1	End	233,773,300 bp

Gene location (Mouse)
Chr.	Chromosome 1 (mouse)
Band	1|1 D	Start	87,998,522 bp
Band	1|1 D	End	88,146,719 bp
RNA expression pattern
Bgee	Human / Mouse (ortholog); Top expressed in: mucosa of transverse colon; duodenum; rectum; gallbladder; olfactory zone of nasal mucosa; appendix; gastric mucosa; epithelium of colon; body of stomach; islet of Langerhans / Top expressed in: hepatobiliary system; liver; duodenum; embryo; colon; renal cortex; proximal tubule; stomach; human kidney; ileum; More reference expression data
BioGPS	n/a
Gene ontology
Molecular function	transferase activity; retinoic acid binding; hexosyltransferase activity; protein homodimerization activity; glycosyltransferase activity; protein heterodimerization activity; enzyme binding; protein kinase C binding; glucuronosyltransferase activity; UDP-glycosyltransferase activity
Cellular component	integral component of membrane; membrane; intracellular membrane-bounded organelle; endoplasmic reticulum; endoplasmic reticulum membrane
Biological process	negative regulation of cellular glucuronidation; xenobiotic glucuronidation; flavone metabolic process; metabolism; negative regulation of glucuronosyltransferase activity; negative regulation of fatty acid metabolic process; cellular glucuronidation; flavonoid glucuronidation
Sources:Amigo / QuickGO
Orthologs
Databases	NCBI: entry; OMA: entry
Species	Human	Mouse
Entrez	54575	394434
Ensembl	ENSG00000242515	ENSMUSG00000090175
UniProt	Q9HAW8	Q62452
RefSeq (mRNA)	NM_019075	NM_201644
RefSeq (protein)	NP_061948	NP_964006
Location (UCSC)	Chr 2: 233.64 – 233.77 Mb	Chr 1: 88 – 88.15 Mb
PubMed search
- Wikidata
View/Edit Human	View/Edit Mouse

UDP-glucuronosyltransferase 1-10 is an enzyme that in humans is encoded by the UGT1A10 gene.

This gene encodes a UDP-glucuronosyltransferase, an enzyme of the glucuronidation pathway that transforms small lipophilic molecules, such as steroids, bilirubin, hormones, and drugs, into water-soluble, excretable metabolites. This gene is part of a complex locus that encodes several UDP-glucuronosyltransferases. The locus includes thirteen unique alternate first exons followed by four common exons. Four of the alternate first exons are considered pseudogenes. Each of the remaining nine 5' exons may be spliced to the four common exons, resulting in nine proteins with different N-termini and identical C-termini. Each first exon encodes the substrate binding site, and is regulated by its own promoter. The enzyme encoded by this gene has glucuronidase activity on mycophenolic acid, coumarins, and quinolines.

== Interactive pathway map ==
Click on genes, proteins and metabolites below to link to respective articles. (Note: The interactive pathway map can be edited at WikiPathways: "IrinotecanPathway_WP229".)

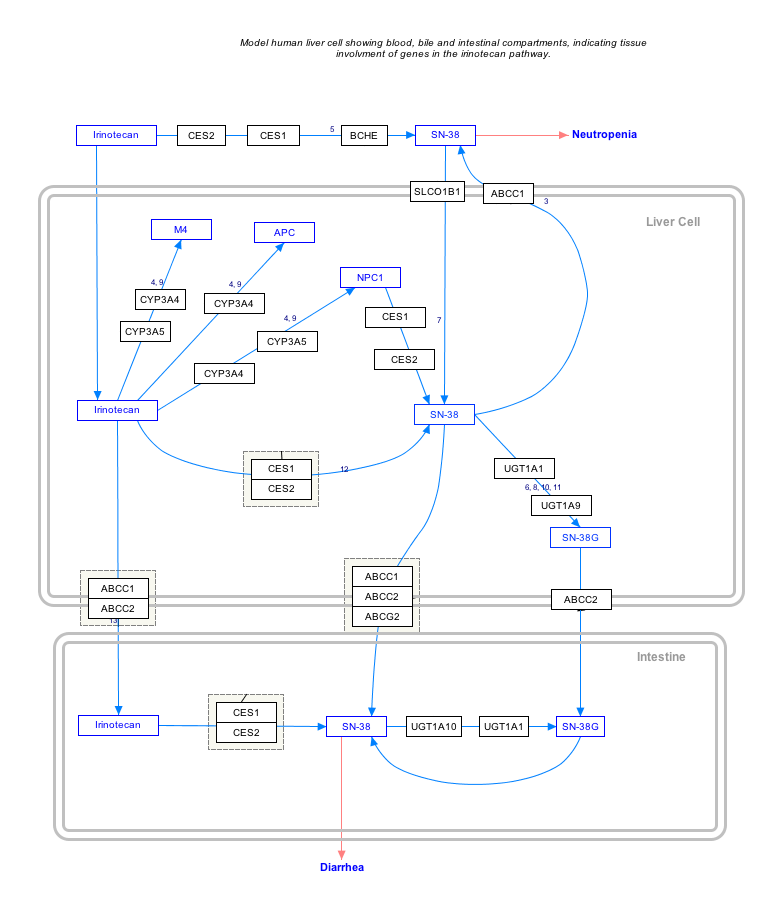

Irinotecan Pathway edit
