= Glucuronidation =

Chemical reaction

Glucuronidation is often involved in drug metabolism of substances such as drugs, pollutants, bilirubin, androgens, estrogens, mineralocorticoids, glucocorticoids, fatty acid derivatives, retinoids, and bile acids. These linkages involve glycosidic bonds.

== Mechanism ==
Glucuronidation consists of transfer of the glucuronic acid component of uridine diphosphate glucuronic acid to a substrate by any of several types of UDP-glucuronosyltransferase. UDP-glucuronic acid (glucuronic acid linked via a glycosidic bond to uridine diphosphate) is an intermediate in the process and is formed in the liver. One example is the N-glucuronidation of an aromatic amine, 4-aminobiphenyl, by UGT1A4 or UGT1A9 from human, rat, or mouse liver.

The substances resulting from glucuronidation are known as glucuronides (or glucuronosides) and are typically much more water-soluble than the non-glucuronic acid-containing substances from which they were originally synthesised. The human body uses glucuronidation to make a large variety of substances more water-soluble, and, in this way, allow for their subsequent elimination from the body through urine or feces (via bile from the liver). Hormones are glucuronidated to allow for easier transport around the body. Pharmacologists have linked drugs to glucuronic acid to allow for more effective delivery of a broad range of potential therapeutics. Sometimes toxic substances are also less toxic after glucuronidation.

The conjugation of xenobiotic molecules with hydrophilic molecular species such as glucuronic acid is known as phase II metabolism.

== Sites ==
Glucuronidation occurs mainly in the liver, although the enzyme responsible for its catalysis, UDP-glucuronyltransferase, has been found in all major body organs (e.g., intestine, kidneys, brain, adrenal gland, spleen, and thymus).

== General influencing factors ==
Various factors affect the rate of glucuronidation, which in turn will affect these molecules' clearance from the body. Generally, an increased rate of glucuronidation results in a loss of potency for the target drugs or compounds.

Factor		Effect on glucuronidation	Main drugs or compounds affected
Age	Infant	↑	Chloramphenicol, morphine, paracetamol, bilirubin, steroids
Age	Elderly	↑ or unchanged	No change found for paracetamol, oxazepam, temazepam, or propranolol. Decreased clearance found for codeine-6-glucuronide, and decreased unbound clearance for oxazepam in the very elderly.
Sex	Females	↓	Clearance higher in males for paracetamol, oxazepam, temazepam, and propranolol. Possible additive role with CYP1A2 resulting in higher clozapine and olanzapine concentrations in females
Sex	Males	↑	Clearance higher in males for paracetamol, oxazepam, temazepam, and propranolol. Possible additive role with CYP1A2 resulting in higher clozapine and olanzapine concentrations in females
Body habitus	Overweight	↑	Clearance of lorazepam, oxazepam, temazepam, and paracetamol likely the result of an increase in liver size and quantity of enzyme
Body habitus	Underweight/malnourished	↓	Chloramphenicol, paracetamol
Disease states	Fulminant hepatitis, cirrhosis	↓	Zidovudine, oxazepam, lamotrigine
Disease states	Hypothyroidism	↓	Oxazepam, paracetamol
Disease states	HIV	↓	Paracetamol
Tobacco smoking		↑	Propranolol, oxazepam, lorazepam, paracetamol. Possible additive role with CYP1A2 induction causing decreased clozapine and olanzapine concentration.

== Affected drugs ==
Many drugs which are substrates for glucuronidation as part of their metabolism are significantly affected by inhibitors or inducers of their specific glucuronisyltransferase types:

Substrate	Inhibitors of glucuronidation	Inducers of glucuronidation
Morphine	Amitriptyline; Clomipramine; Clonazepam; Diazepam; Flunitrazepam; Lorazepam; Nitrazepam; Oxazepam; Codeine	Rifampin; Tobacco smoking; Phenobarbital
Oxazepam	Ethinylestradiol; Fenoprofen; Ibuprofen; Ketoprofen; Naproxen	Phenobarbitone; Phenytoin
Bilirubin		Phenobarbital
Paracetamol	Ethinylestradiol; Probenecid; Propranolol	
Androsterone	Promethazine; Chlorpromazine	
Carbamazepine- 10,11-transdiol	Valproic acid	
Codeine	Amitriptyline; Diclofenac	
Lamotrigine	Sertraline; Valproic acid	
Lorazepam	Ethinylestradiol; Probenecid; Valproic acid	
Temazepam	Probenecid	
Testosterone	Amitriptyline; Chlorpromazine; Imipramine; Promethazine	
Zidovudine	Probenecid; Valproic acid	
