= Codeine-6-glucuronide =

Active metabolite of codeine

Names
- IUPAC name (5α,6α)-3-methoxy-17-methyl-7,8-didehydro-4,5-epoxymorphinan-6-yl β-D-glucopyranosiduronic acid
- Preferred IUPAC name (2S,3S,4S,5R,6R)-3,4,5-Trihydroxy-6-{[(4R,4aR,7S,7aR,12bS)-9-methoxy-3-methyl-2,3,4,4a,7,7a-hexahydro-1H-4,12-methano[1]benzofuro[3,2-e]isoquinolin-7-yl]oxy}oxane-2-carboxylic acid

Identifiers
CAS Number	20736-11-2
3D model (JSmol)	Interactive image
ChemSpider	4590054
PubChem CID	5489029
UNII	E2M937KY47
CompTox Dashboard (EPA)	DTXSID60942952
- InChI: InChI=1S/C24H29NO9/c1-25-8-7-24-11-4-6-14(32-23-18(28)16(26)17(27)20(34-23)22(29)30)21(24)33-19-13(31-2)5-3-10(15(19)24)9-12(11)25/h3-6,11-12,14,16-18,20-21,23,26-28H,7-9H2,1-2H3,(H,29,30)/t11-,12+,14-,16-,17-,18+,20-,21-,23+,24-/m0/s1 Key: CRWVOYRJXPDBPM-HSCJLHHPSA-N
- SMILES: O=C(O)[C@H]6O[C@@H](O[C@H]1/C=C\[C@@H]5[C@@]24c3c(ccc(OC)c3O[C@@H]12)C[C@H]5N(C)CC4)[C@H](O)[C@@H](O)[C@@H]6O

Properties
Chemical formula	C_{24}H_{29}NO_{9}
Molar mass	475.494 g·mol^{−1}
- Except where otherwise noted, data are given for materials in their standard state (at 25 °C [77 °F], 100 kPa). Infobox references

Codeine-6-glucuronide (C6G) is a major active metabolite of codeine and may be responsible for as much as 60% of the analgesic effects of codeine. C6G exhibits decreased immunosuppressive effects compared to codeine.

== Formation ==
A glucuronosyltransferase enzyme UGT2B7 present in human liver converts codeine to its glucuronide by adding a sugar acid at the hydroxy group, with uridine diphosphate (UDP) as byproduct:

codeine
+ UDP-glucuronate
UDP
codeine-6-glucuronide

== See also ==
- Morphine-6-glucuronide
