= Pseudomorphine =

Names
- IUPAC name (5α,6α)-2-[(5α,6α)-3,6-dihydroxy-17-methyl-7,8-didehydro-4,5-epoxymorphinan-2-yl]-17-methyl-7,8-didehydro-4,5-epoxymorphinan-3,6-diol

Identifiers
CAS Number	125-24-6
3D model (JSmol)	Interactive image
Abbreviations	2,2'-bimorphine
ChemSpider	4590027
ECHA InfoCard	100.169.464
PubChem CID	234570
UNII	AEZ78QX2G7
CompTox Dashboard (EPA)	DTXSID50924984
- InChI: InChI=1S/C34H36N2O6/c1-35-9-7-33-19-3-5-23(37)31(33)41-29-25(33)15(13-21(19)35)11-17(27(29)39)18-12-16-14-22-20-4-6-24(38)32-34(20,8-10-36(22)2)26(16)30(42-32)28(18)40/h3-6,11-12,19-24,31-32,37-40H,7-10,13-14H2,1-2H3 Key: FOJYFDFNGPRXDR-UHFFFAOYSA-N
- SMILES: CN1CCC23C4C1CC5=C2C(=C(C(=C5)C6=CC7=C8C(=C6O)OC9C81CCN(C(C7)C1C=CC9O)C)O)OC3C(C=C4)O

Properties
Chemical formula	C_{34}H_{36}N_{2}O_{6}
Molar mass	568.670 g·mol^{−1}
- Except where otherwise noted, data are given for materials in their standard state (at 25 °C [77 °F], 100 kPa). Infobox references

Pseudomorphine (also known as oxydimorphine or dehydromorphine) is an inactive, natural dimerisation product of the morphine molecule in tandem and thus a common impurity in morphine concentrations. It was first described by Pelletier in 1835.

This compound may be synthesized by the oxidative coupling of morphine by potassium ferricyanide.

Pseudomorphine contributes very little to morphine's effects. It produces no effects in the central nervous or gastrointestinal systems, but it might have some effects on the circulatory system.

== See also ==
- Thebaine (paramorphine)
- Morphine-N-oxide
- Morphine-3-glucuronide
- Morphine-6-glucuronide
