= C23H27NO9 =

Molecular formula

The molecular formula C_{23}H_{27}NO_{9} (molar mass: 461.46 g/mol) may refer to:

- Morphine-3-glucuronide
- morphine-6-glucuronide
