= Luteolin-7-O-glucuronide 2"-O-glucuronosyltransferase =

Class of enzymes

Luteolin-7-O-glucuronide 7-O-glucuronosyltransferase

Identifiers
- EC no.: 2.4.1.190
- CAS no.: 115490-51-2

Databases
- IntEnz: IntEnz view
- BRENDA: BRENDA entry
- ExPASy: NiceZyme view
- KEGG: KEGG entry
- MetaCyc: metabolic pathway
- PRIAM: profile
- PDB structures: RCSB PDB PDBe PDBsum
- Gene Ontology: AmiGO / QuickGO
Search
- PMC: articles
- PubMed: articles
- NCBI: proteins

Luteolin-7-O-glucuronide 2"-O-glucuronosyltransferase (EC 2.4.1.190) is an enzyme that catalyzes a chemical reaction which converts the flavone, luteolin-7-O-glucuronide, to a disaccharide by adding a sugar acid at one of the hydroxy groups of the starting material, which is the product of a similar reaction catalyzed by luteolin 7-O-glucuronosyltransferase, with uridine diphosphate (UDP) as byproduct. It was characterised from rye.

luteolin-7-O-glucuronide
+ UDP-glucuronate
UDP
luteolin 7-O-(β-D-glucuronosyl-(1→2)-β-D-glucuronide)

This enzyme belongs to the family of glycosyltransferases, specifically the hexosyltransferases. The systematic name of this enzyme class is UDP-glucuronate:luteolin-7-O-beta-D-glucuronide 2''-O-glucuronosyltransferase. Other names in common use include uridine diphosphoglucuronate-luteolin 7-O-glucuronide, glucuronosyltransferase, LMT, and UDP-glucuronate:luteolin 7-O-glucuronide-glucuronosyltransferase.
