= UGT2B7 =

Protein-coding gene in the species Homo sapiens

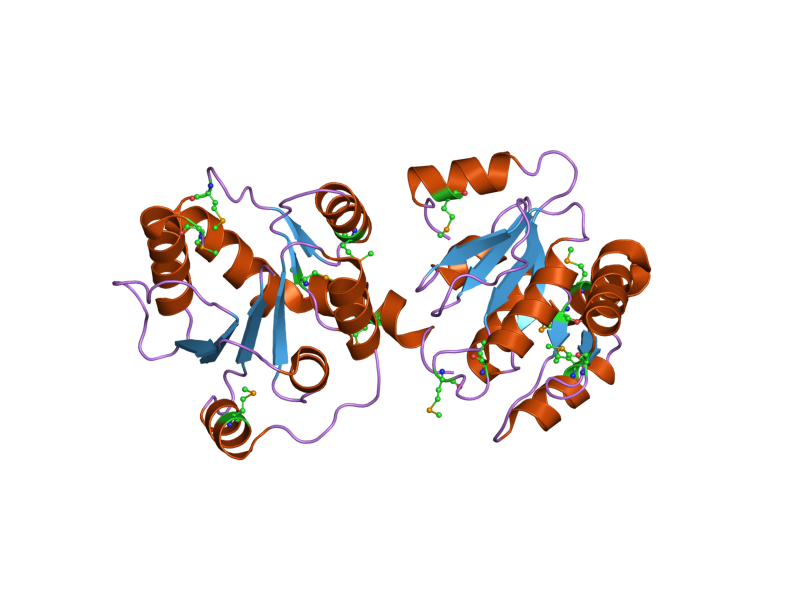

Identifiers
- Aliases: UGT2B7, UDPGT 2B9, UDPGT2B7, UDPGTH2, UGT2B9, UDP glucuronosyltransferase family 2 member B7, UDPGT 2B7, UDPGTh-2
- External IDs: OMIM: 600068; MGI: 3576103; GeneCards: UGT2B7
Available structures
PDB	Human UniProt search: PDBe RCSB
PDB	List of PDB id codes 2O6L
Enzyme activity
EC #	BRENDA	ExPASy	KEGG	MetaCyc
2.4.1.17	↗	↗	↗	↗

Gene location (Human)
Chr.	Chromosome 4 (human)
Band	4q13.2	Start	69,051,363 bp
Band	4q13.2	End	69,112,987 bp

Gene location (Mouse)
Chr.	Chromosome 5 (mouse)
Band	5|5 E1	Start	87,213,786 bp
Band	5|5 E1	End	87,240,414 bp
RNA expression pattern
Bgee	Human / Mouse (ortholog); Top expressed in: liver; right lobe of liver; duodenum; metanephric glomerulus; right uterine tube; endometrium; human kidney; testicle; gallbladder; body of pancreas / Top expressed in: left lobe of liver; morula; duodenum; jejunum; ileum; epithelium of small intestine; Paneth cell; migratory enteric neural crest cell; embryo; human fetus; More reference expression data
BioGPS	n/a
Gene ontology
Molecular function	glycosyltransferase activity; transferase activity; glucuronosyltransferase activity; retinoic acid binding; hexosyltransferase activity; UDP-glycosyltransferase activity
Cellular component	integral component of membrane; organelle membrane; endoplasmic reticulum membrane; membrane; intracellular membrane-bounded organelle; endoplasmic reticulum
Biological process	steroid metabolic process; metabolism; cellular glucuronidation; androgen metabolic process; lipid metabolism
Sources:Amigo / QuickGO
Orthologs
Databases	NCBI: entry; OMA: entry
Species	Human	Mouse
Entrez	7364	231396
Ensembl	ENSG00000171234	ENSMUSG00000070704
UniProt	P16662	n/a
RefSeq (mRNA)	NM_001074; NM_001330719; NM_001349568	NM_001029867
RefSeq (protein)	NP_001065; NP_001317648; NP_001336497	n/a
Location (UCSC)	Chr 4: 69.05 – 69.11 Mb	Chr 5: 87.21 – 87.24 Mb
PubMed search
- Wikidata
View/Edit Human	View/Edit Mouse

UGT2B7 (UDP-Glucuronosyltransferase-2B7) is a phase II metabolism isoenzyme found to be active in the liver, kidneys, epithelial cells of the lower gastrointestinal tract and also has been reported in the brain. In humans, UDP-glucuronosyltransferase-2B7 is encoded by the UGT2B7 gene.

== Structure ==
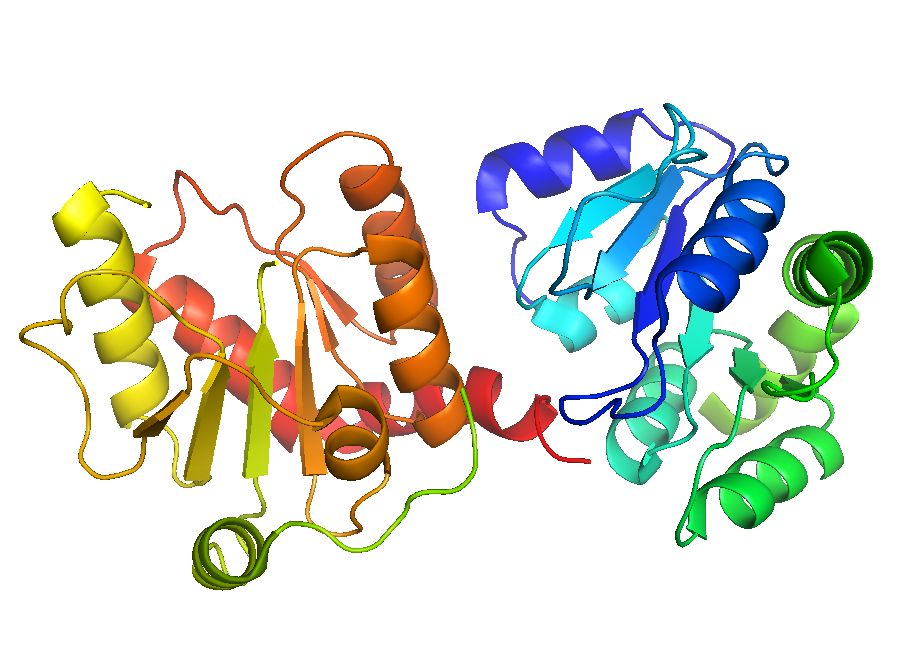
Two protein domains (left, orange-yellow, and right, green-blue) dimerize to form UGT2B7. Both domains contain Rossmann-like folds, beta sheets (arrows) surrounded by alpha helices (spirals), which bind UDP-glucuronic acid.

Human UGT2B7 is a membrane-associated enzyme that functions as a dimer, with each monomer contributing to the overall structural and catalytic architecture. Although a full-length structure of any human UGT has not yet been resolved, the available structural information from the C-terminal domain reveals key features of the protein. This region forms two interacting domains, each adopting a Rossman-like fold characteristic of nucleotide-binding proteins.

The Rossmann fold mediates binding of the UDP-glucuronic acid cofactor required for glucuronidation. Consistent with this role, the C-terminus of UGT enzymes is highly conserved and specialized for cofactor binding, whereas the structurally unresolved N-terminus is responsible for substrate recognition and specificity.

Dimerization is an intrinsic structural feature of UGT2B7 and influences its functional state. The resolved C-terminal structure suggests that interactions between monomers can position the C-terminus of one subunit within the UDP-glucuronic acid binding site of the partner subunit, potentially modulating catalytic competence.

UGT2B7 can form both homodimers and heterodimers with other UGT isoforms, including UGT1A1, as well as with its own genetic variants. These oligomeric arrangements alter the structural organization of the enzyme and can impact glucuronidation activity depending on the specific pairing.

== Function ==
The UGTs serve a major role in the conjugation and subsequent elimination of potentially toxic xenobiotics and endogenous compounds. UGT2B7 has unique specificity for 3,4-catechol estrogens and estriol, suggesting that it may play an important role in regulating the level and activity of these potent estrogen metabolites.

This enzyme is located on the endoplasmic reticulum and nuclear membranes of cells. Its function is to catalyse the conjugation of a wide variety of lipophilic aglycon substrates with glucuronic acid, using uridine diphosphate glucuronic acid.

Together with UGT2B4, UGT2B7 is capable of glucosidation of hyodesoxycholic acid in the liver, but, unlike the 2B4 isoform, 2B7 is also able to glucuronidate various steroid hormones (androsterone, epitestosterone) and fatty acids. It is also able to conjugate major classes of drugs such as analgesics (morphine), carboxylic nonsteroidal anti-inflammatory drugs (ketoprofen), and anticarcinogens (all-trans retinoic acid). UGT2B7 is the major enzyme isoform responsible for the metabolism of morphine, codeine, norcodeine and other opiates to their corresponding 3- and 6- glucuronides. For example, morphine metabolism produces morphine-3-glucuronide (M3G), which has no analgesic effect, by adding a sugar acid at the phenolic hydroxy group, with uridine diphosphate (UDP) as byproduct:

morphine
+ UDP-glucuronate
UGT2B7
UDP
morphine-3-glucuronide

Morphine-6-glucuronide (M6G) is produced in a similar reaction and has analgesic effects more potent than morphine. As a consequence, altered UGT2B7 activity can significantly affect both the effectiveness and side-effects of morphine, as well as some related opiate drugs.

== Genetic polymorphism ==
UGT2B7 is considered to be a highly polymorphic gene. Various research efforts have investigated the potential effect of these polymorphic variants on glucuronidation activity of UGT2B7 and especially its clearance of administered drugs, including anticancer therapies. Decreased glucuronidation activity by genetically variant UGT2B7 could lead to increased toxicity due to elevated levels of the drug remaining or accumulating in a patient's organs especially liver, while increased activity could mean lower efficacy of the administered therapy due to lower than expected levels in the body.

One study found that Han Chinese dye-industry workers exposed to benzidine were at higher risk for developing bladder cancer if they had the UGT2B7 single nucleotide polymorphism (SNP) C802T encoding His268Tyr. The histidine to tyrosine mutation at residue 268 is located in the N-terminal portion of UGT2B7, which binds the xenobiotic substrate as opposed to the C-terminus which binds UDP-glucuronic acid. The speculated mechanism for this increased cancer risk involved increased glucuronidation of benzidine by the mutant UGT2B7 followed by cleavage of the glucuronidated benzidine at urine pH levels, releasing higher concentrations of benzidine in the bladder. Another study looked for a similar association of variant UGT2B7 G900A with the risk of colorectal cancer but found no significant association.

A study of erlotinib clearance in non-small cell lung cancer patients showed no statistical significance for SNPs of UGT2B7, which potentially metabolizes erlotinib as indicated by erlotinib inhibition of UGT2B7. An investigation into the clearance of diclofenac, a nonsteroidal anti-inflammatory drug (NSAID) that can cause serious drug-induced liver injury, showed that mutant UGT2B7 with the C802T SNP had a 6-fold lower clearance of diclofenac than wild-type UGT2B7, possibly contributing to increased liver toxicity in patients with this mutation. Analysis of genetic polymorphisms of UGT2B7 in anti-tuberculosis drug-induced liver injury (ATLI) found no association between mutations of UGT2B7 and ATLI in the studied population.

UGT2B7 is also known to be involved in the metabolism of opioids via glucuronidation, and a study investigating the effect of polymorphisms on the analgesic efficacy of buprenorphine found that the mutation C802T significantly worsened the analgesic response to buprenorphine after thoracic surgery, particularly at longer time-points (48 hours) where this long-lasting opioid is meant to remain effective. This same variant was found separately to have significant effects on the blood plasma concentration of valproic acid administered to epilepsy patients, which may account for some of the individual variability seen with this narrow-therapeutic window treatment. Both of these cases indicate decreased concentrations of drug compound probably due to increased glucuronidation activity of UGT2B7 with the C802T polymorphism.

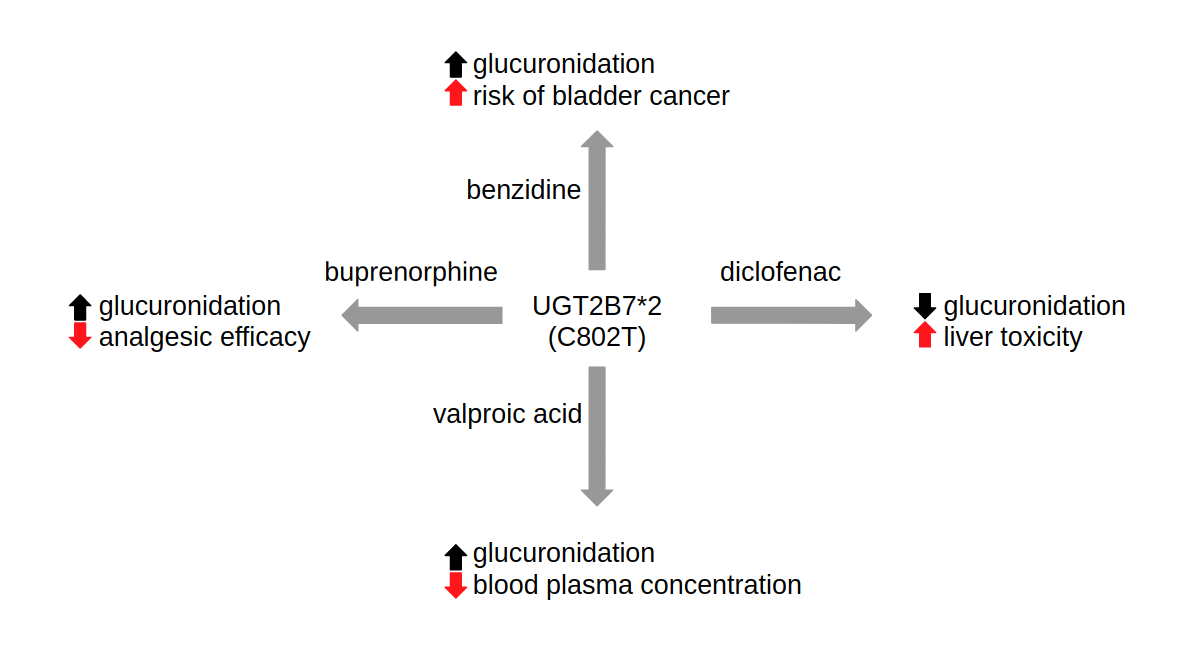
Summary of some of the recent published effects of the UGT2B7*2 (C802T) polymorphism.

Since UGT2B7 is involved in glucuronidation of many xenobiotic compounds, and polymorphisms of UGT2B7 are prevalent, investigation into potential effects of polymorphisms of UGT2B7 on clearance of pharmacologically relevant compounds is often of interest, as shown by the variety of studies undertaken. The UGT2B7 C802T polymorphism, for example, has been noted at 73% prevalence in Asians and 46% prevalence in Caucasians; therefore, effects of this polymorphism could impact a large portion of the population. However, not all studies find significant changes in clearance due to these genetic polymorphisms. It is not always clear if this is due to the particular polymorphism not affecting enzyme activity of UGT2B7, or because the compound of interest is metabolized by various routes that can mask any differences due to changes in UGT2B7 activity.

== Research ==
The UGT2B7 nanodisc is the first UGT nanodisc. Nanodisc preparations allow for simplified UGT assays compared to microsomal systems.
