= Luteolin-7-O-glucuronide =

Names
- IUPAC name (2S,3S,4S,5R)-6-[2-(3,4-dihydroxyphenyl)-5-hydroxy-4-oxochromen-7-yl]oxy-3,4,5-trihydroxyoxane-2-carboxylate
- Other names Luteolin-7-O-beta-D-glucuronide; Luteolin 7-O-beta-_{D}-glucuronide

Identifiers
CAS Number	38934-20-2
3D model (JSmol)	Interactive image
ChemSpider	24784676
KEGG	C03515
PubChem CID	25245094
CompTox Dashboard (EPA)	DTXSID50952181
- InChI: InChI=1S/C21H18O12/c22-9-2-1-7(3-10(9)23)13-6-12(25)15-11(24)4-8(5-14(15)32-13)31-21-18(28)16(26)17(27)19(33-21)20(29)30/h1-6,16-19,21-24,26-28H,(H,29,30)/p-1/t16-,17-,18+,19-,21?/m0/s1 Key: VSUOKLTVXQRUSG-DAZJWRSOSA-M
- SMILES: C1=CC(=C(C=C1C2=CC(=O)C3=C(C=C(C=C3O2)OC4[C@@H]([C@H]([C@@H]([C@H](O4)C(=O)[O-])O)O)O)O)O)O

Properties
Chemical formula	C_{21}H_{18}O_{12}
Molar mass	462.363 g·mol^{−1}
- Except where otherwise noted, data are given for materials in their standard state (at 25 °C [77 °F], 100 kPa). Infobox references

Luteolin-7-O-glucuronide is a chemical compound that is classified as a flavone.

It is found in Acanthus hirsutus and in rye (Secale cereale).

== Biosynthesis and metabolism ==
Luteolin 7-O-glucuronosyltransferase is the glucuronosyltransferase that uses UDP-glucuronate to convert luteolin its glucuronide by adding a sugar acid at one of the phenolic hydroxy groups, with uridine diphosphate (UDP) as byproduct:

luteolin
+ UDP-glucuronate
UDP
luteolin-7-O-glucuronide

Luteolin-7-O-glucuronide 2"-O-glucuronosyltransferase is an enzyme that adds a second sugar group to luteolin-7-O-glucuronide to give luteolin 7-O-(beta-D-glucuronosyl-(1→2)-beta-D-glucuronide).

luteolin-7-O-glucuronide + UDP-glucuronate
UDP
luteolin 7-O-(β-D-glucuronosyl-(1→2)-β-D-glucuronide)
