= A. hirsutus =

A. hirsutus may refer to:

- Acanthus hirsutus, a plant species
- Artocarpus hirsutus, the wild jack or jungle jack, a tree species native to India
