= UDP-glucuronate decarboxylase =

Class of enzymes

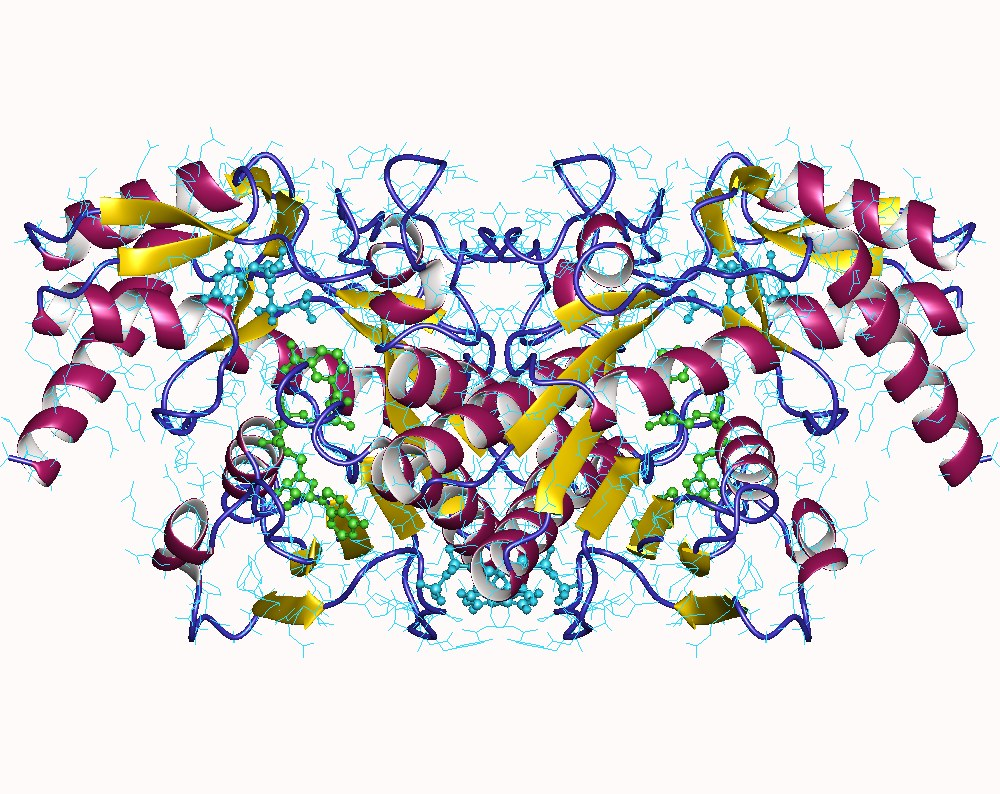
- UDP-glucuronate decarboxylase 1, dimer, Human

Identifiers
- EC no.: 4.1.1.35
- CAS no.: 9024-68-4

Databases
- BRENDA: enzyme data
- ExPASy: NiceZyme view
- KEGG: enzyme entry
- MetaCyc: metabolic pathway
- Rhea: reactions
- PDB structures: RCSB PDB PDBe PDBsum
- Gene Ontology: AmiGO / QuickGO
Search
- PMC: articles
- PubMed: articles
- NCBI: proteins

UDP-glucuronate decarboxylase (EC 4.1.1.35) is a carboxy-lyase enzyme characterised from wheat that catalyzes the decarboxylation of uridine diphosphate glucuronic acid (UDP-glucuronate) to UDP-xylose and carbon dioxide:

uridine diphosphate glucuronic acid
CO_{2}
UDP-xylose

Nicotinamide adenine dinucleotide is used as a cofactor. The reaction is part of the biosynthesis pathway to proteoglycans. In the fungus Cryptococcus neoformans, the enzyme is involved in capsule formation and virulence of this human pathogen.

The systematic name of this enzyme class is UDP-D-glucuronate carboxy-lyase (UDP-D-xylose-forming). Other names in use include uridine-diphosphoglucuronate decarboxylase, and UDP-D-glucuronate carboxy-lyase.

== Structural studies ==
As of late 2007, two structures have been solved for this class of enzymes, with PDB accession codes PDB: 2B69 and PDB: 2BLL.
