= Luteolin 7-O-glucuronosyltransferase =

Class of enzymes

Identifiers
- EC no.: 2.4.1.189
- CAS no.: 115490-49-8

Databases
- IntEnz: IntEnz view
- BRENDA: BRENDA entry
- ExPASy: NiceZyme view
- KEGG: KEGG entry
- MetaCyc: metabolic pathway
- PRIAM: profile
- PDB structures: RCSB PDB PDBe PDBsum
- Gene Ontology: AmiGO / QuickGO
Search
- PMC: articles
- PubMed: articles
- NCBI: proteins

Luteolin 7-O-glucuronosyltransferase (EC 2.4.1.189) is an enzyme that catalyzes the chemical reaction

luteolin
+ UDP-glucuronate
UDP
luteolin-7-O-glucuronide

The two substrates of this enzyme characterised from rye are the flavone, luteolin. and UDP-glucuronate which react to give the glucuronide, luteolin 7-O-glucuronide, by adding a sugar acid at one of the phenolic hydroxy groups, with uridine diphosphate (UDP) as byproduct.

This enzyme belongs to the family of glycosyltransferases, specifically the hexosyltransferases. The systematic name of this enzyme class is UDP-glucuronate:luteolin 7-O-glucuronosyltransferase. Other names in common use include uridine diphosphoglucuronate-luteolin 7-O-glucuronosyltransferase, and LGT.
