= Glucuronate-1-phosphate uridylyltransferase =

Class of enzymes

Identifiers
- EC no.: 2.7.7.44
- CAS no.: 52228-05-4

Databases
- IntEnz: IntEnz view
- BRENDA: BRENDA entry
- ExPASy: NiceZyme view
- KEGG: KEGG entry
- MetaCyc: metabolic pathway
- PRIAM: profile
- PDB structures: RCSB PDB PDBe PDBsum
- Gene Ontology: AmiGO / QuickGO
Search
- PMC: articles
- PubMed: articles
- NCBI: proteins

Glucuronate-1-phosphate uridylyltransferase (EC 2.7.7.44) is an enzyme that catalyzes the chemical reaction

1-phospho-α-D-glucuronic acid
+
uridine triphosphate
PP_{i}
uridine diphosphate glucuronic acid

The enzyme characterised from barley seedlings combines 1-phospho-α-D-glucuronic acid and uridine triphosphate to give uridine diphosphate glucuronic acid, with pyrophosphate (PP_{i}) as a byproduct.

This enzyme is a transferase, specifically one transferring phosphorus-containing nucleotide groups (nucleotidyltransferases). The systematic name of this enzyme class is UTP:1-phospho-alpha-D-glucuronate uridylyltransferase. Other names in common use include UDP-glucuronate pyrophosphorylase, UDP-D-glucuronic acid pyrophosphorylase, UDP-glucuronic acid pyrophosphorylase, and uridine diphosphoglucuronic pyrophosphorylase.
