= Codeine-N-oxide =

Names
- Systematic IUPAC name (1S,4S,5R,13R,14S,17R)-10-Methoxy-4-methyl-12-oxa-4-azapentacyclo[9.6.1.0^{1,13}.0^{5,17}.0^{7,18}]octadeca-7(18),8,10,15-tetraen-14-ol 4-oxide

Identifiers
CAS Number	3688-65-1
3D model (JSmol)	Interactive image
ChemSpider	4514400
ECHA InfoCard	100.020.899
PubChem CID	5359929
UNII	Z32OFX7V17
CompTox Dashboard (EPA)	DTXSID00190359
- InChI: InChI=1S/C18H21NO4/c1-19(21)8-7-18-11-4-5-13(20)17(18)23-16-14(22-2)6-3-10(15(16)18)9-12(11)19/h3-6,11-13,17,20H,7-9H2,1-2H3/t11-,12+,13-,17-,18-,19-/m0/s1 Key: BDLSDHWCOJPHIE-KFUGMXNISA-N; InChI=1/C18H21NO4/c1-19(21)8-7-18-11-4-5-13(20)17(18)23-16-14(22-2)6-3-10(15(16)18)9-12(11)19/h3-6,11-13,17,20H,7-9H2,1-2H3/t11-,12+,13-,17-,18-,19-/m0/s1 Key: BDLSDHWCOJPHIE-KFUGMXNIBR
- SMILES: [O-][N@@+]4([C@@H]3Cc5c1c(O[C@@H]2[C@]1([C@H]3/C=C\[C@@H]2O)CC4)c(OC)cc5)C

Properties
Chemical formula	C_{18}H_{21}NO_{4}
Molar mass	315.369 g·mol^{−1}
Legal status	BR: Class A1 (Narcotic drugs)
- Except where otherwise noted, data are given for materials in their standard state (at 25 °C [77 °F], 100 kPa). Infobox references

Codeine-N-oxide (genocodeine) is an active metabolite of codeine. It is an opiate listed as a Schedule I controlled substance. It has a DEA ACSCN of 9053 and its annual manufacturing quota for 2013 was 602 grams.

Like morphine-N-oxide, it was studied as a potential pharmaceutical drug and is considerably weaker than codeine. The amine oxides of this type form as oxidation products of the parent chemical; virtually every morphine/codeine class opioid has an equivalent nitrogen derivative such as hydromorphone-N-oxide.
