= Soyasapogenol glucuronosyltransferase =

Class of enzymes

Identifiers
- EC no.: 2.4.1.262

Databases
- IntEnz: IntEnz view
- BRENDA: BRENDA entry
- ExPASy: NiceZyme view
- KEGG: KEGG entry
- MetaCyc: metabolic pathway
- PRIAM: profile
- PDB structures: RCSB PDB PDBe PDBsum
Search
- PMC: articles
- PubMed: articles
- NCBI: proteins

Soyasapogenol glucuronosyltransferase (EC 2.4.1.262, UGASGT) is an enzyme with systematic name UDP-D-glucuronate:soyasapogenol 3-O-D-glucuronosyltransferase. This enzyme catalyses the following chemical reaction

UDP-glucuronate + soyasapogenol B $\rightleftharpoons$ UDP + soyasapogenol B 3-O-D-glucuronide

This enzyme requires a divalent ion, Mg^{2+} or Mn^{2+}, or Ca^{2+}.
