= Galactosylgalactosylxylosylprotein 3-beta-glucuronosyltransferase =

Class of enzymes

galactosylgalactosylxylosylprotein 3-beta-glucuronosyltransferase
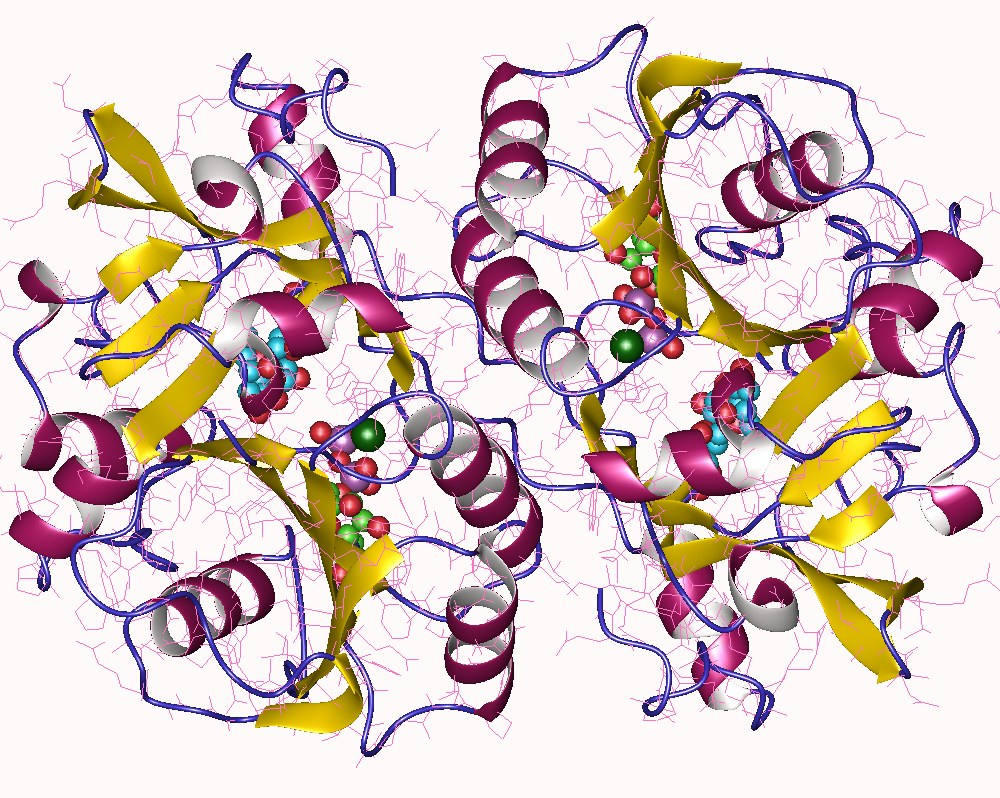
- Galactosylgalactosylxylosylprotein 3-beta-glucuronosyltransferase 3, dimer, Human

Identifiers
- EC no.: 2.4.1.135
- CAS no.: 9030-08-4

Databases
- IntEnz: IntEnz view
- BRENDA: BRENDA entry
- ExPASy: NiceZyme view
- KEGG: KEGG entry
- MetaCyc: metabolic pathway
- PRIAM: profile
- PDB structures: RCSB PDB PDBe PDBsum
- Gene Ontology: AmiGO / QuickGO
Search
- PMC: articles
- PubMed: articles
- NCBI: proteins

In enzymology, a galactosylgalactosylxylosylprotein 3-beta-glucuronosyltransferase (EC 2.4.1.135) is an enzyme that catalyzes the chemical reaction

UDP-glucuronate + 3-beta-D-galactosyl-4-beta-D-galactosyl-O-beta-D-xylosylprotein $\rightleftharpoons$ UDP + 3-beta-D-glucuronosyl-3-beta-D-galactosyl-4-beta-D-galactosyl-O- beta-D-xylosylprotein

Thus, the two substrates of this enzyme are UDP-glucuronate and 3-beta-D-galactosyl-4-beta-D-galactosyl-O-beta-D-xylosylprotein, whereas its 3 products are UDP, 3-beta-D-glucuronosyl-3-beta-D-galactosyl-4-beta-D-galactosyl-O-, and beta-D-xylosylprotein.

This enzyme belongs to the family of glycosyltransferases, specifically the hexosyltransferases. The systematic name of this enzyme class is UDP-glucuronate:3-beta-D-galactosyl-4-beta-D-galactosyl-O-beta-D-xyl osyl-protein D-glucuronosyltransferase. Other names in common use include glucuronosyltransferase I, and uridine diphosphate glucuronic acid:acceptor glucuronosyltransferase. This enzyme participates in chondroitin sulfate biosynthesis and glycan structures - biosynthesis 1. It employs one cofactor, manganese.

== Structural studies ==
As of late 2007, 4 structures have been solved for this class of enzymes, with PDB accession codes 1V82, 1V83, 1V84, and 2D0J.
