= UDPG =

UDPG may refer to:

- Uridine diphosphate glucose
- Uridine diphosphate glucuronic acid
