= Morphine-3-glucuronide =

Names
- IUPAC name 6α-Hydroxy-17-methyl-7,8-didehydro-4,5α-epoxymorphinan-3-yl β-D-glucopyranosiduronic acid
- Systematic IUPAC name (2S,3S,4S,5R,6S)-3,4,5-Trihydroxy-6-{[(4R,4aR,7S,7aR,12bS)-7-hydroxy-3-methyl-2,3,4,4a,7,7a-hexahydro-1H-4,12-methano[1]benzofuro[3,2-e]isoquinolin-9-yl]oxy}oxane-2-carboxylic acid

Identifiers
CAS Number	20290-09-9
3D model (JSmol)	Interactive image
ChEMBL	ChEMBL1329
ChemSpider	4588593
MeSH	Morphine-3-glucuronide
PubChem CID	5484731
UNII	O27Z9CH39A
CompTox Dashboard (EPA)	DTXSID80174157
- InChI: InChI=1S/C23H27NO9/c1-24-7-6-23-10-3-4-12(25)20(23)32-18-13(5-2-9(14(18)23)8-11(10)24)31-22-17(28)15(26)16(27)19(33-22)21(29)30/h2-5,10-12,15-17,19-20,22,25-28H,6-8H2,1H3,(H,29,30)/t10-,11+,12-,15-,16-,17+,19-,20-,22+,23-/m0/s1 Key: WAEXKFONHRHFBZ-ZXDZBKESSA-N
- SMILES: O=C(O)[C@H]6O[C@@H](Oc2c1O[C@H]5[C@@H](O)\C=C/[C@H]4[C@@H]3N(C)CC[C@@]45c1c(cc2)C3)[C@H](O)[C@@H](O)[C@@H]6O

Properties
Chemical formula	C_{23}H_{27}NO_{9}
Molar mass	461.462 g/mol
- Except where otherwise noted, data are given for materials in their standard state (at 25 °C [77 °F], 100 kPa). Infobox references

Morphine-3-glucuronide is a metabolite of morphine produced by UGT2B7. It is not active as an opioid agonist, but does have some action as a convulsant, which does not appear to be mediated through opioid receptors, but rather through interaction with glycine and/or GABA receptors. As a polar compound, it has a limited ability to cross the blood–brain barrier, but kidney failure may lead to its accumulation and result in seizures. Probenecid and inhibitors of P-glycoprotein can enhance uptake of morphine-3-glucuronide and, to a lesser extent, morphine-6-glucuronide. Reported side effects related to the accumulation of this metabolite include convulsions, agitation, hallucinations, hyperalgesia, and coma.

== Formation ==
The enzyme UDP-Glucuronosyltransferase-2B7 converts morphine to its glucuronide by adding a sugar acid at the phenolic hydroxy group, with uridine diphosphate (UDP) as byproduct:

morphine
+ UDP-glucuronate
UGT2B7
UDP
morphine-3-glucuronide

== See also ==
- 3-Monoacetylmorphine, the inactive 3,- position blocked by esterization (and thus inactive) of a semi-synthetic prodrug to morphine marking the same activity profile as the drug of this article
- Buprenorphine-3-glucuronide
- Morphine-6-glucuronide
- Morphine-N-oxide
