= Codeine/paracetamol =

Compound medication

Combination of
- Codeine: Opioid analgesic
- Paracetamol: Anilide analgesic

Clinical data
- Trade names: Tylenol with codeine Zapain; Panadeine Forte
- MedlinePlus: a601005
- License data: US DailyMed: Acetaminophen codeine
- Routes of administration: By mouth
- ATC code: N02BE51 (WHO)

Legal status
- Legal status: AU: S4 (Prescription only); CA: Schedule I; UK: POM (Prescription only) / P; US: Schedule III / Schedule V

Identifiers
- CAS Number: 67889-72-9
- PubChem CID: 11949633
- ChemSpider: 10123946
- KEGG: D02146

Codeine/paracetamol, also called codeine/acetaminophen and co-codamol, is a compound analgesic, comprising codeine phosphate and paracetamol (acetaminophen). Codeine/paracetamol is used for the relief of mild to moderate pain when paracetamol or non-steroidal anti-inflammatory drugs (NSAIDs; such as ibuprofen, aspirin, and naproxen) alone do not sufficiently relieve symptoms.

In 2023, it was the 210th most commonly prescribed medication in the United States, with more than 2 million prescriptions.

== Side effects ==
The most common side effects include constipation, nausea and drowsiness. Others include coughing up blood from the lungs, skin rashes, dizziness, sedation, shortness of breath, hypersensitivity reaction, fainting (syncope or near syncope), confusion, loss of short-term memory, changes in blood, allergic reactions, euphoria, dysphoria, abdominal pain, itchiness, easy bruising, bleeding gums, vivid dreams, dry mouth and addiction.

Genetic differences between people cause differing rates of metabolism of codeine to morphine. In about 5 percent of people this may happen particularly fast, causing morphine to be passed through breast milk in amounts that may cause fatal respiratory depression in a breastfed baby.

== Society and culture ==
=== Availability ===
Of the European Union member states, eleven allow over-the-counter sale of solid dosage forms of codeine, including codeine/paracetamol: Bulgaria, Cyprus, Denmark, Ireland, Latvia, Lithuania, Malta, Poland, Romania, and Slovenia. In the UK, co-codamol is available over the counter after consultation with a pharmacist in doses containing up to 8mg of codeine; above this dosage a prescription is required.
