= Codeine =

Opiate and prodrug of morphine used to treat pain

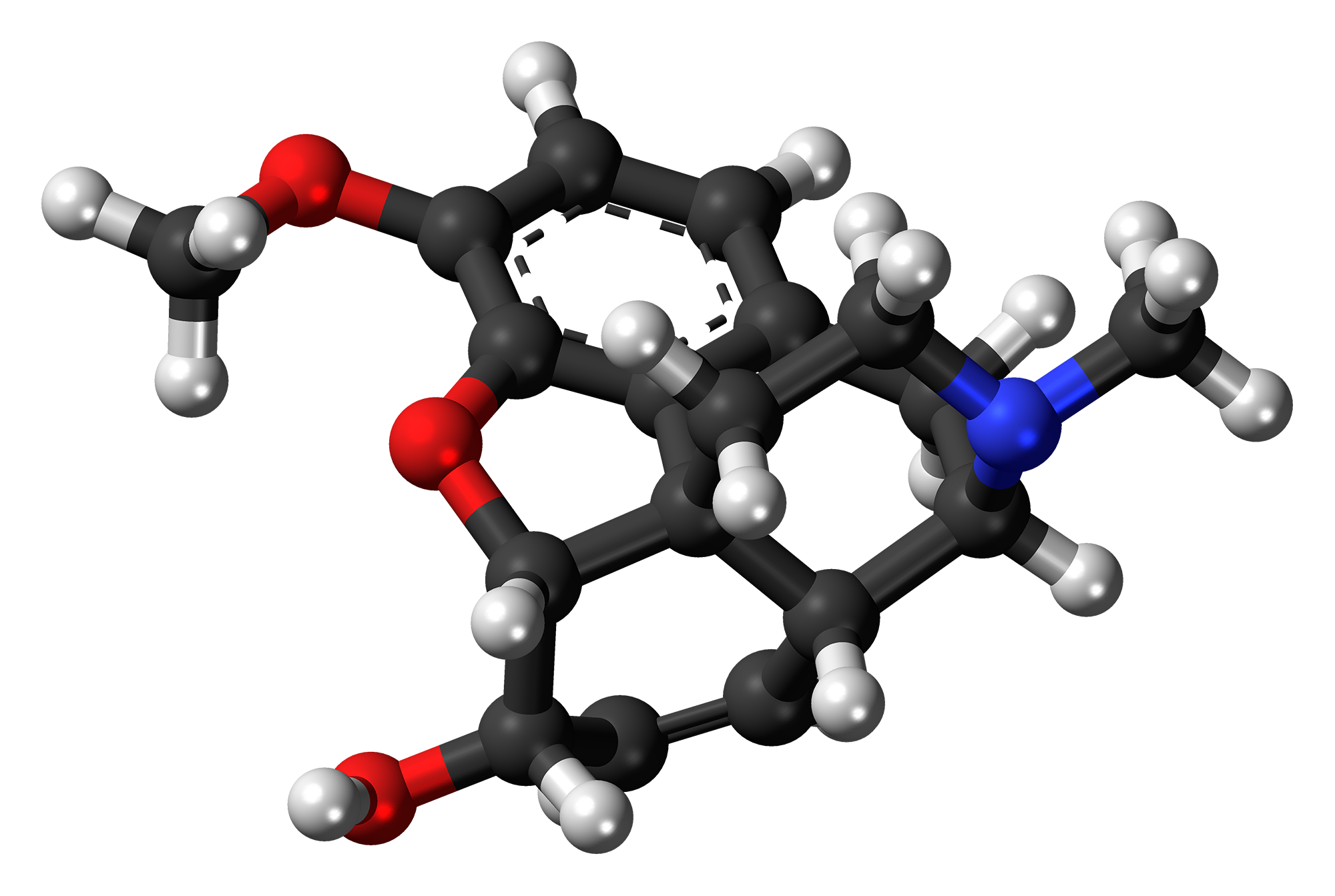

Clinical data
- Pronunciation: /ˈkoʊdiːn/ KOH-deen
- Other names: 3-Methylmorphine
- AHFS/Drugs.com: Monograph
- MedlinePlus: a682065
- License data: US DailyMed: Codeine
- Pregnancy category: AU: A
- Dependence liability: High
- Addiction liability: High
- Routes of administration: By mouth, rectal, subcutaneous, intramuscular
- Drug class: Opioid; Antitussive
- ATC code: R05DA04 (WHO) Combinations: N02AA59 (WHO), N02AA79 (WHO), N02AJ08 (WHO), N02AJ06 (WHO), N02AJ07 (WHO)

Legal status
- Legal status: AU: S8 (Controlled drug) / S4 (Prescription only) (Note: S4 only if in drug combinations; see #Legal status.); BR: Class A2 (Narcotic drugs) / Class C1 (Note: Class C1 only for low doses; see exemptions on Portaria SVS/MS 344/98.); CA: Schedule I; DE: Anlage III (Special prescription form required); NZ: Class C2; UK: Class B / Pharmacy medicine (Note: Pharmacy medicine if purchased over the counter from a licensed pharmacy in a low dose drug combination (typical examples are 8mg codeine with 500mg of paracetamol per tablet; or 12.8mg codeine with 200mg of ibuprofen). Codeine is prescription only and Class B when not in a drug combination or if there is more than 12.8mg codeine in each tablet; see #Legal status.); US: Schedule II / Schedule III–V (Note: Schedule III-V only if in drug combination; see #Legal status.); UN: Narcotic Schedule II / Narcotic Schedule III (Note: Schedule III only if in drug combination; see #Legal status.); SE: Förteckning III

Pharmacokinetic data
- Bioavailability: c. 60% (by mouth)
- Metabolism: Liver: CYP2D6 (to morphine), CYP3A4 (to norcodeine), UGT2B7 (to 3- and 6-glucuronides of codeine, norcodeine, and morphine)
- Metabolites: Morphine; Norcodeine; Others (e.g., conjugates)
- Onset of action: 15–30 minutes
- Elimination half-life: 2.5–3 hours
- Duration of action: 4–6 hours

Identifiers
- IUPAC name: (5α,6α)-7,8-didehydro-4,5-epoxy-3-methoxy-17-methylmorphinan-6-ol
- CAS Number: 76-57-3
- PubChem CID: 5284371
- IUPHAR/BPS: 1673
- DrugBank: DB00318
- ChemSpider: 4447447
- UNII: UX6OWY2V7J
- KEGG: C06174
- ChEBI: CHEBI:16714
- ChEMBL: ChEMBL485
- CompTox Dashboard (EPA): DTXSID2020341
- ECHA InfoCard: 100.000.882

Chemical and physical data
- Formula: C_{18}H_{21}NO_{3}
- Molar mass: 299.370 g·mol^{−1}
- 3D model (JSmol): Interactive image
- SMILES: CN1CC[C@]23[C@@H]4[C@H]1CC5=C2C(=C(C=C5)OC)O[C@H]3[C@H](C=C4)O
- InChI: InChI=1S/C18H21NO3/c1-19-8-7-18-11-4-5-13(20)17(18)22-16-14(21-2)6-3-10(15(16)18)9-12(11)19/h3-6,11-13,17,20H,7-9H2,1-2H3/t11-,12+,13-,17-,18-/m0/s1; Key:OROGSEYTTFOCAN-DNJOTXNNSA-N

Codeine is an opiate and prodrug of morphine mainly used to treat pain, coughing, and diarrhea. It is commonly used as a recreational drug. It is found naturally in the sap of the opium poppy, Papaver somniferum. It is typically used to treat mild to moderate degrees of pain. Greater benefit may occur when combined with paracetamol (acetaminophen) as codeine/paracetamol or a nonsteroidal anti-inflammatory drug (NSAID) such as aspirin or ibuprofen. Evidence does not support its use for acute cough suppression in children. In Europe, it is not recommended as a cough medicine for those under 12 years of age. It is generally taken orally. It usually starts working after half an hour, with maximum effect at two hours. Its effects last for about four to six hours. Codeine exhibits abuse potential similar to other opioid medications, including a risk of addiction and overdose.

Common side effects include nausea, vomiting, constipation, itchiness, lightheadedness, and drowsiness. Serious side effects may include breathing difficulties and addiction. Whether it can be used safely during pregnancy is unclear. Care should be used during breastfeeding, as it may result in opiate toxicity in the baby. Its use as of 2016 is not recommended for children. Codeine works by being broken down by the liver into morphine; how quickly this occurs depends on a person's genetics.

Codeine was discovered in 1832 by Pierre Jean Robiquet. In 2013, about 361,000 kg (795,000 lb) of codeine were produced while 249,000 kg (549,000 lb) were used, which made it the most commonly taken opiate. It is on the World Health Organization's List of Essential Medicines. Codeine occurs naturally and makes up about 2% of opium.

== Medical uses ==
=== Pain ===
Codeine is used to treat mild to moderate pain. It is commonly used to treat post-surgical dental pain.

Weak evidence indicates that it is useful in cancer pain, but it may have increased adverse effects, especially constipation, compared to other opioids. The American Academy of Pediatrics does not recommend its use in children due to side effects. The Food and Drug Administration (FDA) lists age under 12 years old as a contraindication to use.

=== Cough ===
Codeine is used to relieve coughing. Evidence does not support its use for acute cough suppression in children. In Europe, it is not recommended as a cough medicine for those under 12 years of age. Some tentative evidence shows it can reduce a chronic cough in adults.

=== Diarrhea ===
It is used to treat diarrhea and diarrhea-predominant irritable bowel syndrome, although loperamide (which is available without a prescription for milder diarrhea), diphenoxylate, paregoric, or even laudanum are more frequently used to treat severe diarrhea.

=== Formulations ===
Codeine is marketed as both a single-ingredient drug and in combination preparations with paracetamol (as co-codamol: e.g., brands Paracod, Panadeine, and the Tylenol-with-codeine series, including Tylenol 3 and 1, 2, and 4); with aspirin (as co-codaprin); or with ibuprofen (as Nurofen Plus). These combinations provide greater pain relief than either agent alone (drug synergy).

Codeine is also commonly marketed in products containing codeine with other pain killers or muscle relaxers, as well as codeine mixed with phenacetin (Emprazil with codeine No. 1, 2, 3, 4, and 5), naproxen, indomethacin, diclofenac, and others, as well as more complex mixtures, including such mixtures as aspirin + paracetamol + codeine ± caffeine ± antihistamines and other agents, such as those mentioned above.

Codeine-only products can be obtained with a prescription as a time-release tablet. Codeine is also marketed in cough syrups with zero to a half-dozen other active ingredients, and a linctus (e.g., Paveral) for all of the uses for which codeine is indicated.

Injectable codeine is available for subcutaneous or intramuscular injection only; intravenous injection is contraindicated, as this can result in nonimmune mast-cell degranulation and resulting anaphylactoid reaction. Codeine suppositories are also marketed in some countries

== Side effects ==
Common adverse effects associated with the use of codeine include drowsiness and constipation. Less common are itching, nausea, vomiting, dry mouth, miosis, orthostatic hypotension, urinary retention, euphoria, and dysphoria. Rare adverse effects include anaphylaxis, seizure, acute pancreatitis, and respiratory depression. As with all opiates, long-term effects can vary, but can include diminished libido, apathy, and memory loss. Some people may have allergic reactions to codeine, such as the swelling of the skin and rashes.

In August 2012, the United States Food and Drug Administration issued a warning about deaths in pediatric patients less than 6 years old after ingesting "normal" doses of paracetamol with codeine after tonsillectomy; this warning was upgraded to a black box warning in February 2013.

=== Breastfeeding ===
As codeine is metabolized to morphine, morphine can be passed through breast milk. While this was previously believed to occur at potentially fatal levels, the evidence for this has been questioned and the case reports may have been due to direct consumption of the codeine by the infant.

=== Withdrawal and dependence ===
As with other opiates, chronic use of codeine can cause physical dependence which can lead to severe withdrawal symptoms if a person suddenly stops the medication. Withdrawal symptoms include drug craving, runny nose, yawning, sweating, insomnia, weakness, stomach cramps, nausea, vomiting, diarrhea, muscle spasms, chills, irritability, and pain. These side effects also occur in acetaminophen/aspirin combinations, though to a lesser extent. To minimize withdrawal symptoms, long-term users should gradually reduce their codeine medication under the supervision of a healthcare professional.

Also, no evidence indicates that CYP2D6 inhibition is useful in treating codeine dependence, though the metabolism of codeine to morphine (and hence further metabolism to glucuronide morphine conjugates) does have an effect on the abuse potential of codeine.

In 2019 Ireland was said to be on the verge of a codeine addiction epidemic, according to a paper in the Irish Medical Journal. Under Irish law, codeine can be bought over the counter under the supervision of a pharmacist, but there is no mechanism to detect patients travelling to different pharmacies to purchase codeine.

== Pharmacology ==
=== Pharmacodynamics ===
Codeine (and metabolite) at opioid receptors
Compound	Affinities (K_{i})			Ratio	Ref
Compound	MOR	DOR	KOR	MOR:DOR:KOR	Ref
Codeine	79 nM	>1,000 nM	>1,000 nM	ND	
Morphine	1.8 nM	90 nM	317 nM	1:50:176	

Equianalgesic doses
Compound	Route	Dose
Codeine	PO	200 mg
Hydrocodone	PO	20–30 mg
Hydromorphone	PO	7.5 mg
Hydromorphone	IV	1.5 mg
Morphine	PO	30 mg
Morphine	IV	10 mg
Oxycodone	PO	20 mg
Oxycodone	IV	10 mg
Oxymorphone	PO	10 mg
Oxymorphone	IV	1 mg

Codeine is a nonsynthetic opioid. It is a selective agonist of the μ-opioid receptor (MOR). Codeine itself has relatively weak affinity for the MOR. Instead of acting directly on the MOR, codeine functions as a prodrug of its major active metabolites morphine and codeine-6-glucuronide, which are far more potent MOR agonists in comparison.

Codeine has been found as an endogenous compound, along with morphine, in the brains of nonhuman primates with depolarized neurons, indicating that codeine may function as a neurotransmitter or neuromodulator in the central nervous system. Like morphine, codeine causes TLR4 signaling which causes allodynia and hyperalgesia. It does not need to be converted to morphine to increase pain sensitivity.

=== Mechanism of action ===
Codeine is an opiate and an agonist of the μ-opioid receptor (MOR). It acts on the central nervous system to have an analgesic effect. It is metabolised in the liver to produce morphine which is ten times more potent against the MOR. Opioid receptors are G protein-coupled receptors that positively and negatively regulate synaptic transmission through downstream signalling. Binding of codeine or morphine to the μ-opioid receptor results in hyperpolarization of the neuron leading to the inhibition of the release of nociceptive neurotransmitters, causing an analgesic effect and increased pain tolerance due to reduced neuronal excitability.

=== Pharmacokinetics ===
The conversion of codeine to morphine occurs in the liver and is catalyzed by the cytochrome P450 enzyme CYP2D6. CYP3A4 produces norcodeine, and UGT2B7 conjugates codeine, norcodeine, and morphine to the corresponding 3- and 6-glucuronides. Srinivasan, Wielbo, and Tebbett speculate that codeine-6-glucuronide is responsible for a large percentage of the analgesia of codeine, and thus these patients should experience some analgesia.

CYP2D6 converts codeine into morphine, which then undergoes glucuronidation. Life-threatening intoxication, including respiratory depression requiring intubation, can develop over a matter of days in patients who have multiple functional alleles of CYP2D6, resulting in ultrarapid metabolism of opioids such as codeine into morphine.

Studies on codeine's analgesic effect are consistent with the idea that metabolism by CYP2D6 to morphine is important, but some studies show no major differences between those who are poor metabolizers and extensive metabolizers. Evidence supporting the hypothesis that ultrarapid metabolizers may get greater analgesia from codeine due to increased morphine formation is limited to case reports.

Due to the increased metabolism of codeine to morphine, ultrarapid metabolizers (those possessing more than two functional copies of the CYP2D6 allele) are at increased risk of adverse drug effects related to morphine toxicity. Guidelines released by the Clinical Pharmacogenomics Implementation Consortium (CPIC) advise against administering codeine to ultrarapid metabolizers, where this genetic information is available. The CPIC also suggests that codeine use be avoided in poor metabolizers, due to its lack of efficacy in this group.

Codeine and its salts are readily absorbed from the gastrointestinal tract, and ingestion of codeine phosphate produces peak plasma concentrations in about one hour. Plasma half life is between 3 and 4 hours, and oral/intramuscular analgesic potency ratio is approximately equal to 1:1.5. The most common conversion ratio, given on equianalgesia charts used in the United States, Canada, the UK, Republic of Ireland, the European Union, Russia and elsewhere as 130 mg IM equals 200 mg PO—both of which are equivalent to 10 mg of morphine sulphate IV and 60 mg of morphine sulphate PO. The salt:freebase ratio of the salts of both drugs in use are roughly equivalent, and do not generally make a clinical difference.

Codeine is metabolised by O- and N-demethylation in the liver to morphine and norcodeine. Hydrocodone is also a metabolite of codeine in humans. Codeine and its metabolites are mostly removed from the body by the kidneys, primarily as conjugates with glucuronic acid.

The active metabolites of codeine, notably morphine, exert their effects by binding to and activating the μ-opioid receptor. People that can metabolize codeine to an extensive degree could result in a 30 mg dose yielding 4 mg of morphine.

== Chemistry ==
While codeine can be directly extracted from opium, its source, most codeine is synthesized from the much more abundant morphine through the process of O-methylation, through a process first completed in the late 20th century by Robert C. Corcoran and Junning Ma.

=== Relation to other opioids ===
Codeine has been used in the past as the starting material and prototype of a large class of mainly mild to moderately strong opioids, such as hydrocodone (1920 in Germany), oxycodone (1916 in Germany), dihydrocodeine (1908 in Germany), and its derivatives such as nicocodeine (1956 in Austria). However, these opioids are no longer synthesized from codeine and are usually synthesized from other opium alkaloids, specifically thebaine.

== History ==
Codeine, or 3-methylmorphine, is an alkaloid found in the opium poppy, Papaver somniferum var. album, a plant in the family Papaveraceae. Opium poppy has been cultivated and utilized throughout human history for a variety of medicinal (analgesic, anti-tussive and anti-diarrheal) and hypnotic properties linked to the diversity of its active components, which include morphine, codeine and papaverine.

Codeine is found in concentrations of 1% to 3% in opium prepared by the latex method from unripe pods of Papaver somniferum. The name codeine is derived from the Ancient Greek κώδεια (kṓdeia, "poppy head"). The relative proportion of codeine to morphine, the most common opium alkaloid at 4% to 23%, tends to be somewhat higher in the poppy straw method of preparing opium alkaloids.

Until the beginning of the 19th century, raw opium was used in diverse preparations known as laudanum (see Thomas de Quincey's Confessions of an English Opium-Eater, 1821) and paregoric elixirs, several which were popular in England since the beginning of the 18th century; the original preparation seems to have been elaborated in Leiden, the Netherlands around 1715 by a chemist Jakob Le Mort; in 1721 the London Pharmacopoeia mentions an Elixir Asthmaticum, replaced by the term Elixir Paregoricum ("pain soother") in 1746.

The progressive isolation of opium's several active components opened the path to improved selectivity and safety of the opiates-based pharmacopeia.

Morphine had already been isolated in Germany by Friedrich Sertürner in 1804. Codeine was first isolated in 1832 in France by Pierre Robiquet, already famous for the discovery of alizarin, the most widespread red dye, while working on refined morphine extraction processes. Robiquet is also credited with discovering caffeine independently of Pelletier, Caventou, and Runge. Thomas Anderson determined the correct composition in 1853 but a chemical structure was proposed only in 1925 by J. M. Gulland and Robert Robinson. The first crystal structure would have to wait until 1954.

Codeine and morphine, as well as opium, were used in an attempt to treat diabetes in the 1880s and thereafter, as recently as the 1950s.

Numerous codeine salts have been prepared since the drug was discovered. The most commonly used are the hydrochloride (freebase conversion ratio 0.805, i.e. 10 mg of the hydrochloride salt is equivalent in effect to 8.05 mg of the freebase form), phosphate (0.736), sulphate (0.859), and citrate (0.842).

== Society and culture ==
Codeine is the most widely used opiate in the world.

=== Names ===
It is often sold as a salt in the form of either codeine sulfate or codeine phosphate in the United States, United Kingdom, and Australia. Codeine hydrochloride is more common worldwide and the citrate, hydroiodide, hydrobromide, tartrate, and other salts are also seen. The chemical name for codeine is morphinan-6-ol, 7,8-didehydro-4,5-epoxy-3-methoxy-17-methyl-, (5α,6α)-

=== Recreational use ===
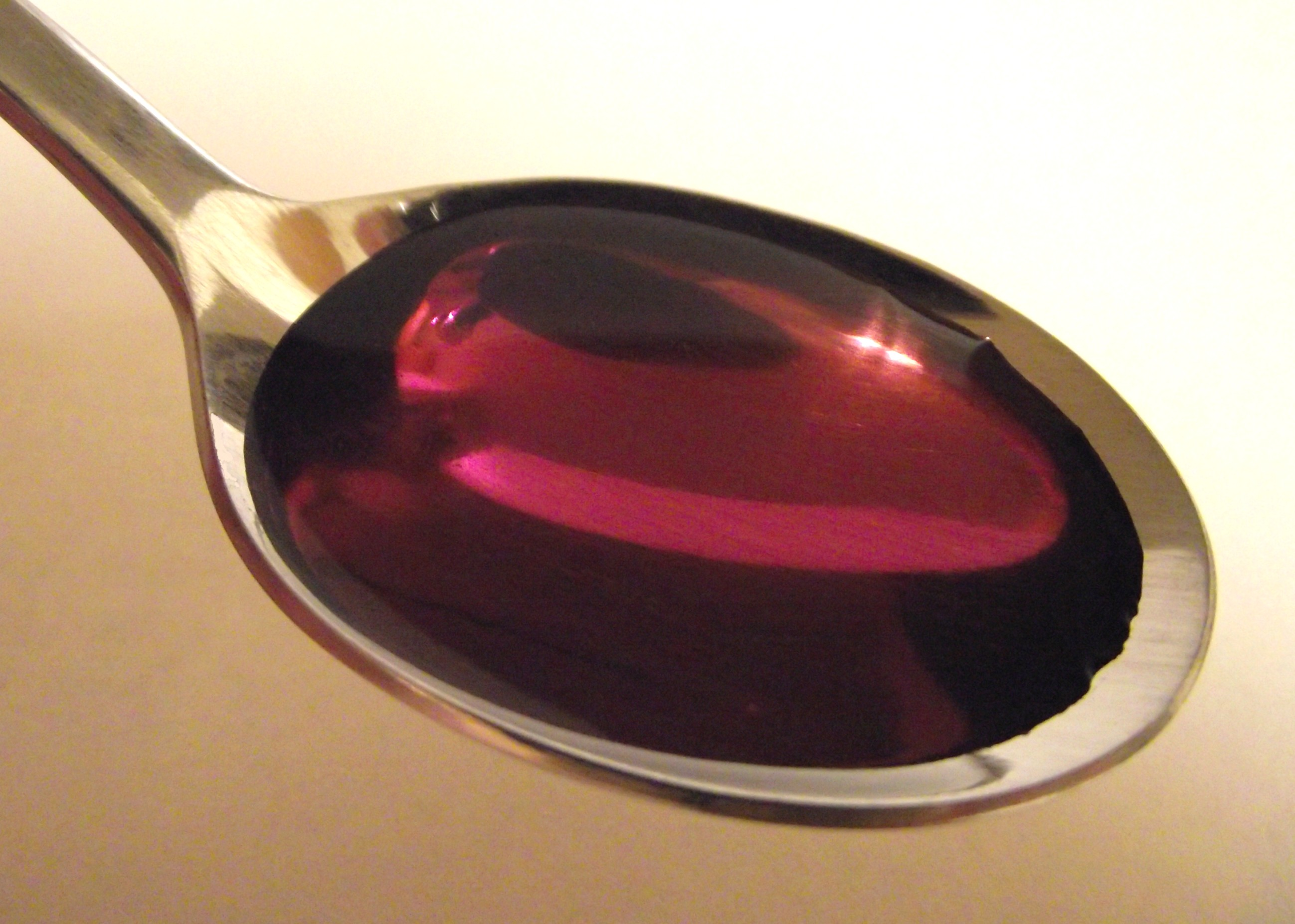
The recreational drug lean can be created with codeine syrup (pictured).

A heroin (diamorphine) or other opiate/opioid addict may use codeine to ward off the effects of withdrawal during periods where their preferred drug is unavailable or unaffordable.

Codeine is also available in conjunction with the anti-nausea medication promethazine in the form of a syrup. Brand named as Phenergan with Codeine or in generic form as promethazine with Codeine, it began to be mixed with soft drinks in the 1990s as a recreational drug, called "syrup", "lean", or "purple drank". Rapper Pimp C, from the group UGK, died from an overdose of this combination.

Codeine is used in illegal drug laboratories to make morphine.

=== Detection ===
Codeine and its major metabolites may be quantitated in blood, plasma, or urine to monitor therapy, confirm a diagnosis of poisoning, or assist in a medico-legal death investigation. Drug abuse screening programs generally test urine, hair, sweat or saliva. Many commercial opiate screening tests directed at morphine cross-react appreciably with codeine and its metabolites, but chromatographic techniques can easily distinguish codeine from other opiates and opioids. Codeine usage results in significant amounts of morphine as an excretion product. Furthermore, heroin contains codeine (or acetyl codeine) as an impurity and its use will result in the excretion of small amounts of codeine. Poppy seed foods represent yet another source of low levels of codeine in one's biofluids. Blood or plasma codeine concentrations are typically in the 50–300 μg/L range in persons taking the drug therapeutically, 700–7,000 μg/L in chronic users, and 1,000–10,000 μg/L in cases of acute fatal over dosage.

Codeine is produced in the human body along the same biosynthetic pathway as morphine. Urinary concentrations of endogenous codeine and morphine have been found to significantly increase in individuals taking L-DOPA for the treatment of Parkinson's disease.

=== Legal status ===
Around the world, codeine is, contingent on its concentration, a Schedule II and III drug under the Single Convention on Narcotic Drugs. In Australia, Canada, New Zealand, Sweden, the United Kingdom, the United States and many other countries, codeine is regulated under various narcotic control laws. In some countries, it is available without a medical prescription in combination preparations from licensed pharmacists in doses up to 20 mg, or 30 mg when sold combined with 500 mg paracetamol.

As of 2015, of the European Union member states, 11 countries (Bulgaria, Cyprus, Denmark, Estonia, Ireland, Latvia, Lithuania, Malta, Poland, Romania, and Slovenia) allow the sale of OTC codeine solid dosage forms. Of these, Estonia has required a prescription since 1 January 2023, leaving only 10 countries.

==== Australia ====
In Australia, since 1 February 2018, preparations containing codeine are not available without a prescription.

Preparations containing pure codeine (e.g., codeine phosphate tablets or codeine phosphate linctus) are available on prescription and are considered S8 (Schedule 8, or "Controlled Drug Possession without authority illegal"). Schedule 8 preparations are subject to the strictest regulation of all medications available to consumers.

Prior to 1 February 2018, Codeine was available over-the-counter (OTC).

==== Canada ====
In Canada, codeine is regulated under the Narcotic Control Regulations (NCR), which falls under the Controlled Drugs and Substances Act (CDSA). Regulations state the pharmacists may, without a prescription, sell low-dose codeine products (containing up to 8 mg of codeine per tablet or up to 20 mg per 30 ml in liquid preparation) if the preparation contains at least two additional medicinal ingredients other than a narcotic (S.36.1 NCR).

In Canada, tablets containing 8 mg of codeine combined with 15 mg of caffeine and 300 mg of acetaminophen are sold as T1s (Tylenol Number 1) without a prescription. A similar tablet called "A.C. & C." (which stands for Acetylsalicylic acid with Caffeine and Codeine) containing 325–375 mg of acetylsalicylic acid (Aspirin) instead of acetaminophen is also available without a prescription. Codeine combined with an antihistamine, and often caffeine, is sold under various trade names and is available without a prescription. These products are kept behind the counter and must be dispensed by a pharmacist who may limit quantities.

Names of many codeine and dihydrocodeine products in Canada tend to follow the narcotic content number system (Tylenol With Codeine No. 1, 2, 3, 4 &c) mentioned below in the section on the United States; it came to be in its current form with the Pure Food and Drug Act of 1906.

Controlled Drugs and Substances Act (S.C. 1996, c. 19) effective 28 July 2020. Codeine is now classified under Schedule 1, giving it a higher priority in the treatments of offenders of the law.

Codeine became a prescription-only medication in the province of Manitoba on 1 February 2016. The number of low-dose codeine tablets sold in Manitoba decreased by 94 percent from 52.5 million tablets sold in the year prior to the policy change to 3.3 million in the year after. A pharmacist may issue a prescription, and all purchases are logged to a central database to prevent overprescribing. Saskatchewan's pharmacy college is considering enacting a similar ban to Manitoba's.

On 9 May 2019, the Canadian Pharmacists Association wrote to Health Canada proposing regulations amending the NCR, the BOTSR, and the FDR - Part G, which included requiring that all products containing codeine be available by prescription only.

New safety measures were issued by Health Canada on 28 July 2016; "codeine should no longer be used (contraindicated) in patients under 18 years of age to treat pain after surgery to remove tonsils or adenoids, as these patients are more susceptible to the risk of serious breathing problems. Codeine (prescription and non-prescription) is already not recommended for children under the age of 12, for any use."

==== Denmark ====
In Denmark, codeine is sold over the counter in dosages up to 9.6 mg (with aspirin, brand name Kodimagnyl); anything stronger requires a prescription.

==== Estonia ====
Until 2023, in Estonia codeine was sold over the counter in dosages up to 8 mg (with paracetamol, brand name Co-Codamol).

==== Ethiopia ====
Approximately 30% of the Ethiopian population carry an extra copy of the gene CYP2D6, and are classified as codeine ultrametabolizers. These individuals metabolize codeine to morphine at a dangerously fast rate, leading to adverse events and potentially death. As a consequence the Ethiopian Food, Medicine and Health Care Administration and Control Authority has entirely banned the use of codeine as unsafe for the general population.

==== France ====
In France, most preparations containing codeine only began requiring a doctor's prescription in 2017. Products containing codeine include Néocodion (codeine and camphor), Tussipax (ethylmorphine and codeine), Paderyl (codeine alone), Codoliprane (codeine with paracetamol), Prontalgine and Migralgine (codeine, paracetamol and caffeine). The 2017 law change made a prescription mandatory for all codeine products, along with those containing ethylmorphine and dextromethorphan.

==== Greece ====
Codeine is classed as an illegal drug in Greece, and individuals possessing it could conceivably be arrested, even if they were legitimately prescribed it in another country. It is sold only with a doctor's prescription (Lonarid-N, Lonalgal).

==== Hong Kong ====
In Hong Kong, codeine is regulated under the Laws of the Hong Kong, Dangerous Drugs Ordinance, Chapter 134, Schedule 1. It can be used legally only by health professionals and for university research purposes. The substance can be given by pharmacists under a prescription. Anyone who supplies the substance without a prescription can be fined $10,000 (HKD). The maximum penalty for trafficking or manufacturing the substance is a $5,000,000 (HKD) fine and life imprisonment. Possession of the substance for consumption without license from the Department of Health is illegal with a $1,000,000 (HKD) fine and/or 7 years of jail time.

However, codeine is available without prescription from licensed pharmacists in doses up to 0.1% (i.e. 5 mg/5ml)

==== India ====
Codeine preparations require a prescription in India. A preparation of paracetamol and codeine is available in India. Codeine is also present in various cough syrups as codeine phosphate including chlorpheniramine maleate. Pure codeine is also available as codeine sulphate tablets. Codeine containing cough medicine has been banned in India with effect from 14 March 2016. The Ministry of Health and Family Welfare has found no proof of its efficacy against cough control.

==== Ireland ====
In Ireland, new regulations came into effect on 1 August 2010 concerning codeine, due to worries about the overuse of the drug. Codeine remains a semi non-prescriptive, over-the-counter drug up to a limit of 12.8 mg per pill, but codeine products must be out of the view of the public to facilitate the legislative requirement that these products "are not accessible to the public for self-selection". In practice, this means customers must ask pharmacists for the product containing codeine in name, and the pharmacist makes a judgement whether it is suitable for the patient to be using codeine, and that patients are fully advised of the correct use of these products. Products containing more than 12.8 mg codeine are available on prescription only.

==== Italy ====
Codeine tablets or preparations require a prescription in Italy. Preparations of paracetamol and codeine are available in Italy as Co-Efferalgan and Tachidol.

==== Japan ====
Codeine is available over the counter at pharmacies, allowing up to 50 mg of codeine phosphate per day for adults.

==== Latvia ====
In Latvia codeine is sold over the counter in dosages up to 8 mg (with paracetamol, brand name Co-Codamol).

==== Nigeria ====
Nigeria in 2018 plans to ban the manufacture and import of cough syrup that include codeine as an ingredient. This is due to concerns regarding its use to get intoxicated.

==== South Africa ====
Codeine is available over the counter in South Africa. Certain pharmacies require people to write down their name and address to ensure they are not buying too much over a short period although many do not require this at all. According to Lochan Naidoo, the former president of the National Narcotics Control Board, making the drugs more difficult to obtain could lead to even worse problems where people in withdrawal would turn to illicit drugs to get their fix.

==== United Arab Emirates ====
The UAE takes an exceptionally strict line on medicines, with many common drugs, notably anything containing codeine being banned unless one has a notarized and authenticated doctor's prescription. Visitors breaking the rules, even inadvertently, have been deported or imprisoned. The US Embassy to the UAE maintains an unofficial list of what may not be imported.

==== United Kingdom ====
In the United Kingdom, the sale and possession of codeine are restricted separately under law.

Neat codeine and higher-strength codeine formulations are generally prescription-only medicines (POM) meaning that the sale of such products is restricted under the Medicines Act 1968. Lower-strength products containing combinations of up to 12.8 mg of codeine per dosage unit, combined with paracetamol, ibuprofen or aspirin are available over the counter at pharmacies. Codeine linctus cough syrups were banned from over-the-counter sale in 2024 due to concerns over addiction and recreational usage. They remain available under a prescription.

Under the Misuse of Drugs Act 1971 codeine is a Class B controlled substance or a Class A drug when prepared for injection. The possession of controlled substances without a prescription is a criminal offence. However, certain preparations of codeine are exempt from this restriction under Schedule 5 of the Misuse of Drugs Regulations 2001. It is thus legal to possess codeine without a prescription, provided that it is compounded with at least one other active or inactive ingredient and that the dosage of each tablet, capsule, etc. does not exceed 100 mg or 2.5% concentration in the case of liquid preparations. The exemptions do not to apply to any preparation of codeine designed for injection.

==== United States ====
In the United States, codeine is regulated by the Controlled Substances Act. Federal law dictates that codeine be a Schedule II controlled substance when used in products for pain relief that contain codeine alone or more than 80 mg per dosage unit. Codeine without aspirin or acetaminophen (Tylenol) is very rarely available or prescribed to discourage abuse. Tablets of codeine in combination with aspirin or acetaminophen (paracetamol) and intended for pain relief are listed as Schedule III.

Cough syrups are classed as Schedule III, IV, or V, depending on formulation. For example, the acetaminophen/codeine antitussive liquid is a Schedule IV controlled substance.

Some states have chosen to reclassify codeine preparations at a more restrictive schedule to lower the instances of its abuse. Minnesota, for instance, has chosen to reclassify Schedule V some codeine preparations (e.g. Cheratussin) as a Schedule III controlled substance.

===== Schedule V controlled substances =====
Substances in this schedule have a low potential for abuse relative to substances listed in Schedule IV and consist primarily of preparations containing limited quantities of certain narcotics.

Examples of Schedule V substances include cough preparations containing not more than 200 milligrams of codeine per 100 milliliters or per 100 grams (Robitussin AC, Phenergan with Codeine).

== Veterinary use ==
Codeine is not recommended as an analgesic in dogs and cats due to poor oral availability and lack of evidence to support the use of codeine over other analgesics.
