= UDP-glucose 6-dehydrogenase =

Mammalian protein found in humans

UGDH
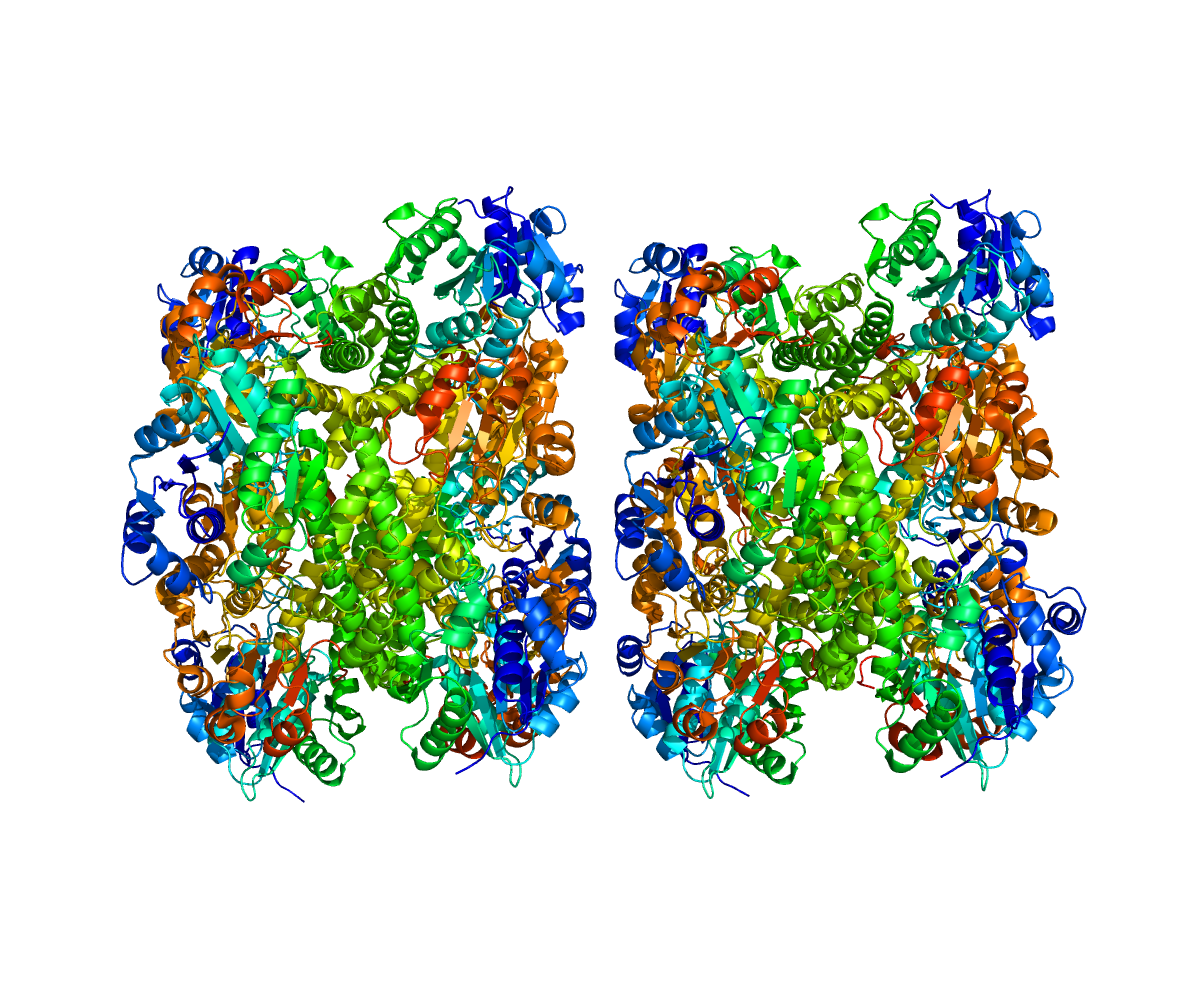
Available structures
PDB	Ortholog search: PDBe RCSB
PDB	List of PDB id codes 2Q3E, 2QG4, 3ITK, 3KHU, 3PRJ, 3PTZ, 3TDK, 3TF5, 4EDF, 4QEJ, 4RJT

Identifiers
- Aliases: UGDH, GDH, UDP-GlcDH, UDPGDH, UGD, UDP-glucose 6-dehydrogenase, EIEE84, DEE84
- External IDs: OMIM: 603370; MGI: 1306785; HomoloGene: 2520; GeneCards: UGDH; OMA:UGDH - orthologs

Gene location (Human)
Chr.	Chromosome 4 (human)
Band	4p14	Start	39,498,755 bp
Band	4p14	End	39,528,311 bp

Gene location (Mouse)
Chr.	Chromosome 5 (mouse)
Band	5 C3.1|5 33.67 cM	Start	65,570,564 bp
Band	5 C3.1|5 33.67 cM	End	65,593,292 bp
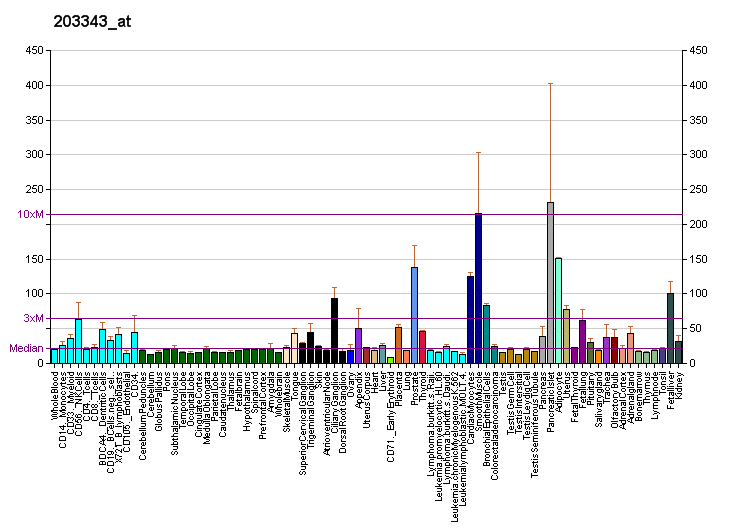
RNA expression pattern
Bgee	Human / Mouse (ortholog); Top expressed in: mucosa of colon; mucosa of sigmoid colon; islet of Langerhans; mucosa of transverse colon; vena cava; rectum; mucosa of ileum; decidua; bronchial epithelial cell; liver / Top expressed in: olfactory epithelium; upper arm; colon; autopod region; hand; stomach; duodenum; epidermis; proximal tubule; metanephros; More reference expression data
BioGPS	More reference expression data
Gene ontology
Molecular function	NAD binding; catalytic activity; oxidoreductase activity; electron transfer activity; oxidoreductase activity, acting on the CH-OH group of donors, NAD or NADP as acceptor; UDP-glucose 6-dehydrogenase activity
Cellular component	nucleoplasm; extracellular exosome; nucleus; cytosol
Biological process	UDP-glucuronate biosynthetic process; gastrulation with mouth forming second; metabolism; UDP-glucose metabolic process; glycosaminoglycan biosynthetic process; electron transport chain; heparan sulfate proteoglycan biosynthetic process; chondroitin sulfate biosynthetic process; protein hexamerization; carbohydrate metabolic process
Sources:Amigo / QuickGO
Orthologs
Species	Human	Mouse
Entrez	7358	22235
Ensembl	ENSG00000109814	ENSMUSG00000029201
UniProt	O60701	O70475
RefSeq (mRNA)	NM_001184700; NM_001184701; NM_003359	NM_009466
RefSeq (protein)	NP_001171629; NP_001171630; NP_003350	NP_033492
Location (UCSC)	Chr 4: 39.5 – 39.53 Mb	Chr 5: 65.57 – 65.59 Mb
PubMed search
- Wikidata
View/Edit Human	View/Edit Mouse

UDP-glucose 6-dehydrogenase is a cytosolic enzyme that in humans is encoded by the UGDH gene.

The protein encoded by this gene converts UDP-glucose to UDP-glucuronate and thereby participates in the biosynthesis of glycosaminoglycans such as hyaluronan, chondroitin sulfate, and heparan sulfate. These glycosylated compounds are common components of the extracellular matrix and likely play roles in signal transduction, cell migration, and cancer growth and metastasis. The expression of this gene is up-regulated by transforming growth factor beta and down-regulated by hypoxia.

This enzyme participates in 4 metabolic pathways: pentose and glucuronate interconversions, ascorbate and aldarate metabolism, starch and sucrose metabolism, and nucleotide sugars metabolism.

Loss of UGDH has recently been implicated in epileptic encephalopathy in humans

== Nomenclature ==
This enzyme belongs to the family of oxidoreductases, specifically those acting on the CH-OH group of donor with NAD^{+} or NADP^{+} as acceptor. The systematic name of this enzyme class is UDP-glucose:NAD^{+} 6-oxidoreductase.

Other names in common use include:

- UDP-glucose dehydrogenase,
- uridine diphosphoglucose dehydrogenase,
- UDPG dehydrogenase,
- UDPG:NAD oxidoreductase,
- UDP-alpha-D-glucose:NAD oxidoreductase,
- UDP-glucose:NAD^{+} oxidoreductase,
- uridine diphosphate glucose dehydrogenase,
- UDP-D-glucose dehydrogenase, and
- uridine diphosphate D-glucose dehydrogenase.

== Biochemistry ==
UDP-glucose 6-dehydrogenase

Identifiers
- EC no.: 1.1.1.22
- CAS no.: 9028-26-6

Databases
- IntEnz: IntEnz view
- BRENDA: BRENDA entry
- ExPASy: NiceZyme view
- KEGG: KEGG entry
- MetaCyc: metabolic pathway
- PRIAM: profile
- PDB structures: RCSB PDB PDBe PDBsum
- Gene Ontology: AmiGO / QuickGO
Search
- PMC: articles
- PubMed: articles
- NCBI: proteins

In enzymology, a UDP-glucose 6-dehydrogenase (EC 1.1.1.22) is an enzyme that catalyzes the chemical reaction

UDP-glucose
+ 2 NAD^{+}
H_{2}O
2 H^{+}
H_{2}O
2 H^{+}
UDP glucuronic acid
+ 2 NADH

The 3 substrates of this enzyme are UDP-glucose, oxidised nicotinamide adenine dinucleotide (NAD^{+}), and water. Its products are UDP-glucuronic acid, reduced NADH, and two protons.
