= Norcodeine =

Chemical compound

Clinical data
- Dependence liability: High
- ATC code: none

Legal status
- Legal status: BR: Class A2 (Narcotic drugs); CA: Schedule I; DE: Anlage I (Authorized scientific use only)

Identifiers
- IUPAC name: 3-Methoxy-6α-hydroxy-4,5α-epoxy-7,8-didehydromorphinan
- CAS Number: 467-15-2
- PubChem CID: 9925873
- ChemSpider: 8101508
- UNII: 32W9P3T4ML
- CompTox Dashboard (EPA): DTXSID8046327
- ECHA InfoCard: 100.006.718

Chemical and physical data
- Formula: C_{17}H_{19}NO_{3}
- Molar mass: 285.343 g·mol^{−1}
- 3D model (JSmol): Interactive image
- SMILES: COC1=C2C3=C(C[C@@H]4[C@H]5[C@]3(CCN4)[C@@H](O2)[C@H](C=C5)O)C=C1
- InChI: InChI=1S/C17H19NO3/c1-20-13-5-2-9-8-11-10-3-4-12(19)16-17(10,6-7-18-11)14(9)15(13)21-16/h2-5,10-12,16,18-19H,6-8H2,1H3/t10-,11+,12-,16-,17-/m0/s1; Key:HKOIXWVRNLGFOR-KOFBORESSA-N

Norcodeine is an opiate analogue that is the N-demethylated derivative of codeine. It has relatively little opioid activity in its own right, but is formed as a metabolite of codeine following ingestion.

Norcodeine is a Schedule I Narcotic controlled substance in the US with the ACSCN of 9309 and zero annual manufacturing quota. The salts in use are the acetate (free base conversion ratio 0.826), hydroiodide (0.662), hydrochloride (0.759), nitrate (0.819), platinichloride (0.582), and sulphate (0.744).

== See also ==
- Nalodeine
