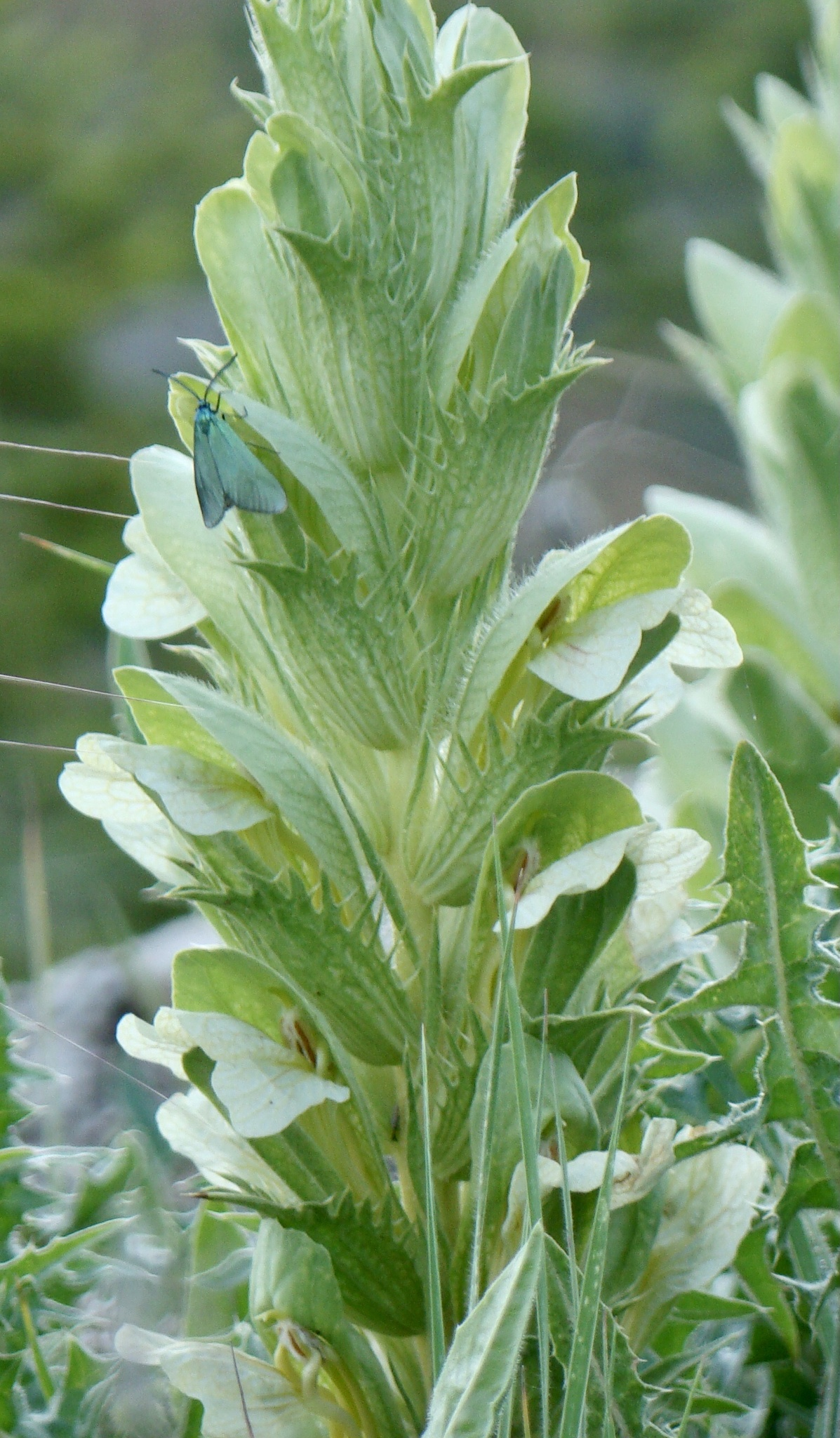
- In Turkey

Scientific classification
- Kingdom: Plantae
- Clade: Tracheophytes
- Clade: Angiosperms
- Clade: Eudicots
- Clade: Asterids
- Order: Lamiales
- Family: Acanthaceae
- Genus: Acanthus
- Species: A. hirsutus

Binomial name
- Acanthus hirsutus Boiss.

Subspecies
- A. h. subsp. hirsutus A. h. subsp. syriacus

= Acanthus hirsutus =

Species of flowering plant

Acanthus hirsutus is a species of flowering plant in the Acanthaceae family.

It contains the glycosides hirsutusoide (2-(o-hydroxyphenyl)-2-hydroxyethenyl-O-beta-glucopyranoside), luteolin-7-O-beta-D-glucuronide, beta-sitosterol-3-O-beta-D-glucopyranoside and (2R)-2-O-beta-D-glucopyranosyl-2H-1,4-benzoxazin-3(4H)-one.
