= Morphine-N-oxide =

- Canonical, stereo, Kekulé, skeletal formula of morphine-N-oxide

Names
- IUPAC name (4R,4aR,7S,7aR,12bS)-3-Methyl-2,3,4,4a,7,7a-hexahydro-1H-4,12-methano[1]benzofuro[3,2-e]isoquinoline-7,9-diol 3-oxide

Identifiers
CAS Number	639-46-3
3D model (JSmol)	Interactive image; Interactive image
ChemSpider	4515047
ECHA InfoCard	100.010.324
EC Number	211-355-8
KEGG	C11786
PubChem CID	5362459
UNII	9E77NL2Y9I
CompTox Dashboard (EPA)	DTXSID301018237
- InChI: InChI=1S/C17H19NO4/c1-18(21)7-6-17-10-3-5-13(20)16(17)22-15-12(19)4-2-9(14(15)17)8-11(10)18/h2-5,10-11,13,16,19-20H,6-8H2,1H3/t10-,11+,13-,16-,17-,18?/m0/s1 Key: AMAPEXTUMXQULJ-APQDOHRLSA-N
- SMILES: CN1(=O)CC[C@@]23[C@H]4Oc5c2c(C[C@@H]1[C@@H]3C=C[C@@H]4O)ccc5O; CN1(=O)CC[C@]23[C@H]4OC5=C(O)C=CC(C[C@@H]1[C@@H]2C=C[C@@H]4O)=C35

Properties
Chemical formula	C_{17}H_{19}NO_{4}
Molar mass	301.342 g·mol^{−1}
Legal status	BR: Class A1 (Narcotic drugs)
- Except where otherwise noted, data are given for materials in their standard state (at 25 °C [77 °F], 100 kPa). Infobox references

Morphine-N-oxide (genomorphine) is an active opioid metabolite of morphine. Morphine itself, in trials with rats, is 11–22 times more potent than morphine-N-oxide subcutaneously and 39–89 times more potent intraperitoneally. However, pretreatment with amiphenazole or tacrine increases the potency of morphine-N-oxide in relation to morphine (intraperitoneally more so than in subcutaneous administration). A possible explanation is that morphine-N-oxide is rapidly inactivated in the liver and impairment of inactivation processes or enzymes increases functionality.

Morphine-N-oxide can also form as a decomposition product of morphine outside the body and may show up in assays of opium and poppy straw concentrate. Codeine and the semi-synthetics such as heroin, dihydrocodeine, dihydromorphine, hydromorphone, and hydrocodone also have equivalent amine oxide derivatives.

Morphine-N-oxide has a DEA ACSCN of 9307 and annual production quota of 655 grams in 2013. It is a Schedule I controlled substance in the US.

== See also ==
- Codeine-N-oxide
- Morphine-6-glucuronide
- Morphine-3-glucuronide
