= Morphine-6-glucuronide =

Names
- Other names M6G

Identifiers
CAS Number	20290-10-2
3D model (JSmol)	Interactive image
ChEMBL	ChEMBL1330
ChemSpider	4514548
ECHA InfoCard	100.161.871
MeSH	Morphine-6-glucuronide
PubChem CID	5360621
UNII	64Y9KYM60R
CompTox Dashboard (EPA)	DTXSID40174158
- InChI: InChI=1S/C23H27NO9/c1-24-7-6-23-10-3-5-13(31-22-17(28)15(26)16(27)19(33-22)21(29)30)20(23)32-18-12(25)4-2-9(14(18)23)8-11(10)24/h2-5,10-11,13,15-17,19-20,22,25-28H,6-8H2,1H3,(H,29,30)/t10-,11+,13-,15-,16-,17+,19-,20-,22+,23-/m0/s1 Key: GNJCUHZOSOYIEC-GAROZEBRSA-N
- SMILES: O=C(O)[C@H]6O[C@@H](O[C@H]1/C=C\[C@@H]5[C@@]24c3c(ccc(O)c3O[C@@H]12)C[C@H]5N(C)CC4)[C@H](O)[C@@H](O)[C@@H]6O

Properties
Chemical formula	C_{23}H_{27}NO_{9}
Molar mass	461.46 g/mol
- Except where otherwise noted, data are given for materials in their standard state (at 25 °C [77 °F], 100 kPa). Infobox references

Morphine-6-glucuronide (M6G) is a major active metabolite of morphine. M6G is formed from morphine by the enzyme UGT2B7. It has analgesic effects roughly half that of morphine. M6G can accumulate to toxic levels in kidney failure.

== History of discovery ==
This analgesic activity of M6G (in animals) was first noted by Yoshimura.

Subsequent work at St Bartholomew's Hospital, London in the 1980s, using a sensitive and specific high-performance liquid chromatography assay, accurately defined for the first time the metabolism of morphine, and the abundance of this metabolite (along with morphine-3-glucuronide, considered an inactive metabolite).

It was postulated that kidney impairment would result in accumulation of the kidney-excreted active agent M6G, leading to potentially fatal toxicity such as respiratory depression. The frequent use of morphine in critically ill patients, and the common occurrence of kidney failure in this group implied that M6G accumulation could be a common, but previously unanticipated problem. The first studies demonstrated massive levels of M6G in 3 patients with kidney failure, which resolved as kidney function returned. Accumulation of M3G and M6G also decreased with return of kidney function after kidney transplantation.

A key step in defining the importance of M6G in humans came in 1992 when the substance was artificially synthesised and administered to patients with pain, the majority of whom described pain relief.

== Formation ==
A glucuronosyltransferase enzyme UGT2B7 converts morphine to its glucuronide by adding a sugar acid at the hydroxy group at the 6-position, with uridine diphosphate (UDP) as byproduct:

morphine
+ UDP-glucuronate
UDP
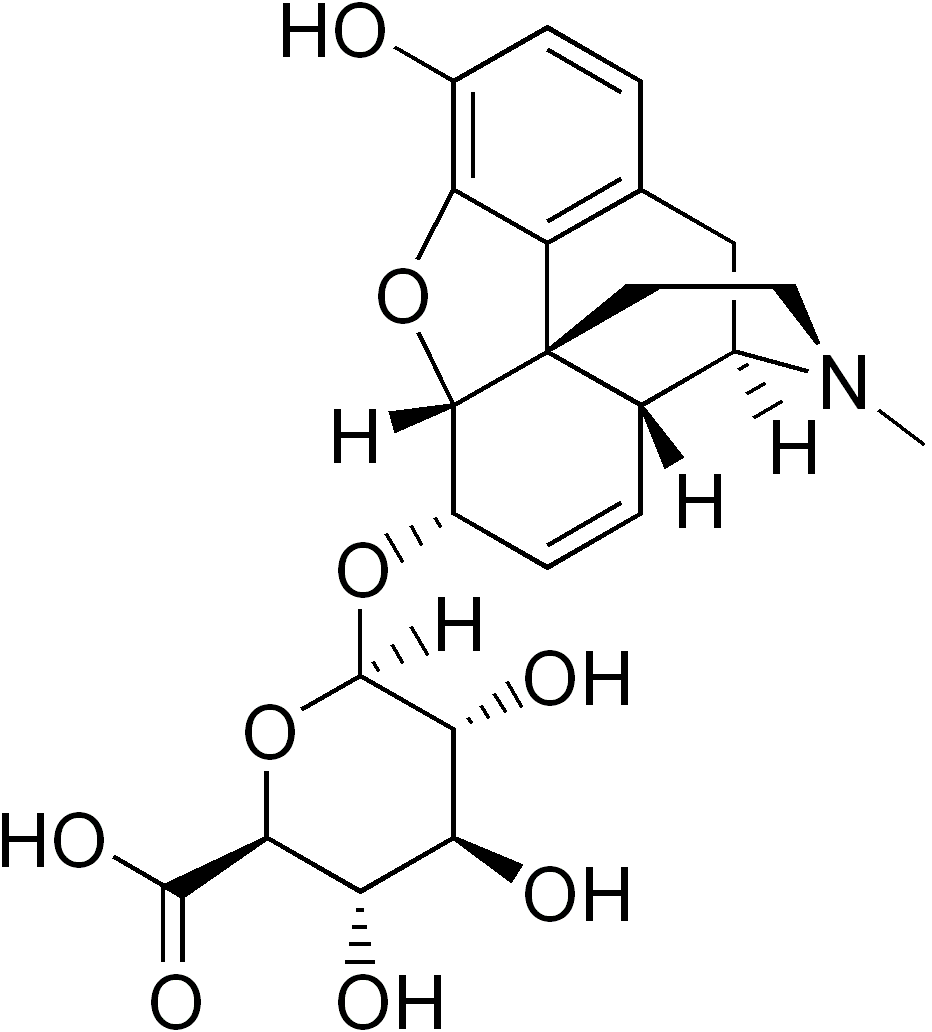
morphine-6-glucuronide

== See also ==
- Codeine-6-glucuronide
- Morphine-N-oxide
