= Glucuronide =

Class of chemical compounds

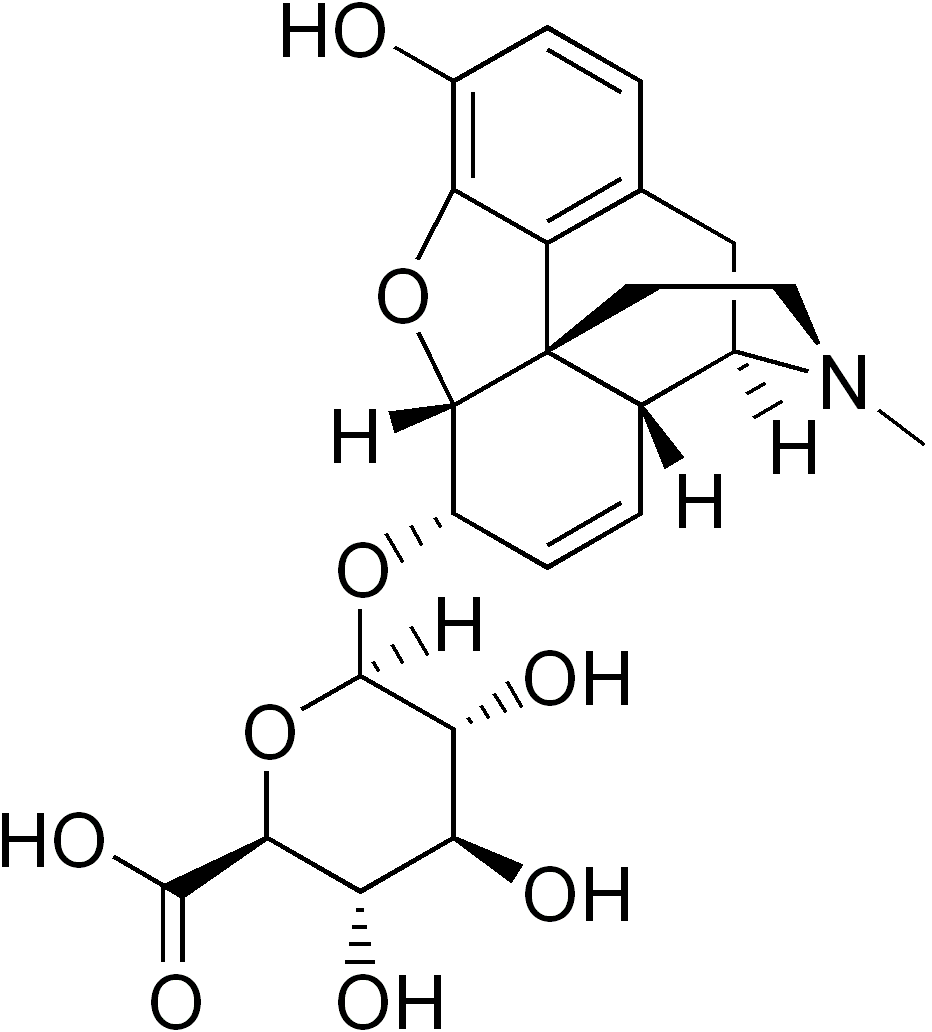
Morphine-6-glucuronide, a major metabolite of morphine

A glucuronide, also known as glucuronoside, is any substance produced by linking glucuronic acid to another substance via a glycosidic bond. The glucuronides belong to the glycosides.

Glucuronidation, the conversion of chemical compounds to glucuronides, is a method that animals use to assist in the excretion of toxic substances, drugs or other substances that cannot be used as an energy source. Glucuronic acid is attached via a glycosidic bond to the substance, and the resulting glucuronide, which has a much higher water solubility than the original substance, is eventually excreted by the kidneys.

Enzymes that cleave the glycosidic bond of a glucuronide are called glucuronidases.

== Classes of glucuronides ==
=== Acyl glucuronide ===
Carboxylic acids are a common functional group in many medications, such as NSAIDs, anticonvulsants, and diuretics. One common pathway for the clearance of carboxylic-acid-containing drugs is via glucuronidation. By conjugating one such drug to a glucuronide, the resulting compound should be less toxic and exhibit rapid clearance from the body. Many in vitro studies have provided compelling evidence to suggest, however, that acyl glucuronidation could have adverse pharmacological effects due to protein adduction. Two mechanisms in which acyl glucuronides lead to protein adduction are: transacylation of the 1-O-β-glucuronide and glycation of the 3-O-β-glucuronide.

=== N^{+}-glucuronide ===
Glucuronidation of nitrogen-containing compounds generally form quaternary ammonium-linked glucuronides. Nicotine, which contains a pyridine ring and a pyrrolidine ring, is conjugated at the pyridine nitrogen during drug metabolism. There are two enantiomers of nicotine: S(-)-nicotine and R(+)-nicotine. S(-)-nicotine is the more common stereoisomer of the compound, primarily forming through combustion of nicotine-containing drugs. The S(-)-nicotine N1-glucuronide has a lower K_{m} and higher V_{max} for liver microsomes than the N(+)-nicotine N1-glucuronide, suggesting that the body has evolved to favor the eradication of the more common N-linked moiety.

== Examples ==
- Miquelianin (Quercetin 3-O-glucuronide)
- Morphine-6-glucuronide
- Scutellarein-7-glucuronide
