= Uridine diphosphate glucuronic acid =

Names
- IUPAC name 3-[(5′-Deoxyuridin-5′-yl)oxy]-1,3-dihydroxy-1,3-dioxo-1λ^{5},3λ^{5}-diphosphoxan-1-yl α-D-glucopyranosiduronic acid
- Systematic IUPAC name (2S,3S,4S,5R,6R)-6-[(3-{[(2R,3S,4R,5R)-5-(2,4-Dioxo-3,4-dihydropyrimidin-1(2H)-yl)-3,4-dihydroxyoxolan-2-yl]methoxy}-1,3-dihydroxy-1,3-dioxo-1λ^{5},3λ^{5}-diphosphoxan-1-yl)oxy]-3,4,5-trihydroxyoxane-2-carboxylic acid

Identifiers
CAS Number	2616-64-0
3D model (JSmol)	Interactive image
ChEBI	CHEBI:17200
ChemSpider	19951236
IUPHAR/BPS	1784
MeSH	UDP+glucuronic+acid
PubChem CID	17473
UNII	04SZC4MEFQ
CompTox Dashboard (EPA)	DTXSID00903961
- InChI: InChI=1S/C9H12N2O6.C6H12O13P2/c12-3-4-6(14)7(15)8(17-4)11-2-1-5(13)10-9(11)16;7-1-2(18-20(12,13)14)5(19-21(15,16)17)3(8)4(9)6(10)11/h1-2,4,6-8,12,14-15H,3H2,(H,10,13,16);1-5,8-9H,(H,10,11)(H2,12,13,14)(H2,15,16,17)/p-4/t4-,6-,7-,8-;2-,3+,4-,5+/m10/s1 Key: GIFKDHYZEJQSDD-BZYIUNRFSA-J; InChI=1/C9H12N2O6.C6H12O13P2/c12-3-4-6(14)7(15)8(17-4)11-2-1-5(13)10-9(11)16;7-1-2(18-20(12,13)14)5(19-21(15,16)17)3(8)4(9)6(10)11/h1-2,4,6-8,12,14-15H,3H2,(H,10,13,16);1-5,8-9H,(H,10,11)(H2,12,13,14)(H2,15,16,17)/p-4/t4-,6-,7-,8-;2-,3+,4-,5+/m10/s1 Key: GIFKDHYZEJQSDD-DNQFPBLIBB
- SMILES: O[C@@H]1[C@@H](O)[C@H](O[C@@H]([C@H]1O)C(O)=O)O[P](O)(=O)O[P](O)(=O)OC[C@H]2O[C@H]([C@H](O)[C@@H]2O)[N]3C=C[C](=O)[NH][C]3=O

Properties
Chemical formula	C_{15}H_{22}N_{2}O_{18}P_{2}
Molar mass	580.285
- Except where otherwise noted, data are given for materials in their standard state (at 25 °C [77 °F], 100 kPa). verify (what is ?) Infobox references

UDP-glucuronic acid is a sugar used in the creation of polysaccharides and is an intermediate in the biosynthesis of ascorbic acid (except in primates and guinea pigs). It is central to the glucuronidation reaction, in which waste molecules in the body, such as heme, are made more hydrophilic to facilitate their excretion.

It is made from UDP-glucose by UDP-glucose 6-dehydrogenase (EC 1.1.1.22) using NAD+ as a cofactor. It is the source of the glucuronosyl group in glucuronosyltransferase reactions.

== See also ==
- Glucuronic acid
- UDP
