= Zyklophin =

Chemical compound

Clinical data
- ATC code: None

Legal status
- Legal status: In general: legal

Identifiers
- IUPAC name: N-Benzyl-L-tyrosylglycylglycyl-N-[(3S,6S,9S,12S)-6-[(2S)-2-butanyl]-3-({(2S)-5-carbamimidamido-1-[(2S)-2-{[(2S)-1,6-diamino-1-oxo-2-hexanyl]carbamoyl}-1-pyrrolidinyl]-1-oxo-2-pentanyl}carbamoyl)-9-(3-carbamimidamidopropyl)-5,8,11,14-tetraoxo-1,4,7,10-tetraazacyclotetradecan-12-yl]-L-phenylalaninamide
- CAS Number: 1819383-12-4
- PubChem CID: 45483651
- IUPHAR/BPS: 9193
- ChemSpider: 30844961

Chemical and physical data
- Formula: C_{65}H_{96}N_{20}O_{13}
- Molar mass: 1365.610 g·mol^{−1}
- 3D model (JSmol): Interactive image
- SMILES: CC[C@H](C)[C@H]1C(=O)N[C@@H](CNC(=O)C[C@@H](C(=O)N[C@H](C(=O)N1)CCCNC(=N)N)NC(=O)[C@H](CC2=CC=CC=C2)NC(=O)CNC(=O)CNC(=O)[C@H](CC3=CC=C(C=C3)O)NCC4=CC=CC=C4)C(=O)N[C@@H](CCCNC(=N)N)C(=O)N5CCC[C@H]5C(=O)N[C@@H](CCCCN)C(=O)N
- InChI: InChI=1S/C65H96N20O13/c1-3-38(2)54-62(97)83-49(60(95)81-45(21-13-29-73-65(70)71)63(98)85-30-14-22-50(85)61(96)79-43(55(67)90)19-10-11-27-66)35-75-51(87)33-48(59(94)80-44(57(92)84-54)20-12-28-72-64(68)69)82-58(93)47(32-39-15-6-4-7-16-39)78-53(89)37-76-52(88)36-77-56(91)46(31-40-23-25-42(86)26-24-40)74-34-41-17-8-5-9-18-41/h4-9,15-18,23-26,38,43-50,54,74,86H,3,10-14,19-22,27-37,66H2,1-2H3,(H2,67,90)(H,75,87)(H,76,88)(H,77,91)(H,78,89)(H,79,96)(H,80,94)(H,81,95)(H,82,93)(H,83,97)(H,84,92)(H4,68,69,72)(H4,70,71,73)/t38-,43-,44-,45-,46-,47-,48-,49-,50-,54-/m0/s1; Key:UWLIKQFWZOPOAX-KLROISQLSA-N

Zyklophin is a semisynthetic peptide derived from dynorphin A and a highly selective antagonist of the κ-opioid receptor (KOR). It is systemically-active, displaying good metabolic stability and blood-brain-barrier penetration. Similarly to other KOR antagonists, it has been shown to block stress-induced reinstatement of cocaine-seeking in animals. The drug is currently experimental, and thus cannot be considered safe for consumption or usage.

== See also ==
- CERC-501
- PF-4455242
- BU09059
- ALKS-5461
