= C36H53N7O6 =

The molecular formula C_{36}H_{53}N_{7}O_{6} (molar mass: 679.85 g/mol, exact mass: 679.4057 u) may refer to:

- Difelikefalin
- Telaprevir
