= Asimadoline =

Chemical compound

Clinical data
- Other names: EMD-61753
- ATC code: none

Identifiers
- IUPAC name: N-[(1S)-2-[(3S)-3-Hydroxypyrrolidin-1-yl]-1-phenylethyl]-N-methyl-2,2-diphenylacetamide
- CAS Number: 153205-46-0
- PubChem CID: 179340
- ChemSpider: 156107
- UNII: D0VK52NV5M
- ChEMBL: ChEMBL1190199
- CompTox Dashboard (EPA): DTXSID60165285

Chemical and physical data
- Formula: C_{27}H_{30}N_{2}O_{2}
- Molar mass: 414.549 g·mol^{−1}
- 3D model (JSmol): Interactive image
- SMILES: CN([C@H](CN1CC[C@@H](C1)O)C2=CC=CC=C2)C(=O)C(C3=CC=CC=C3)C4=CC=CC=C4
- InChI: InChI=1S/C27H30N2O2/c1-28(25(21-11-5-2-6-12-21)20-29-18-17-24(30)19-29)27(31)26(22-13-7-3-8-14-22)23-15-9-4-10-16-23/h2-16,24-26,30H,17-20H2,1H3/t24-,25+/m0/s1; Key:JHLHNYVMZCADTC-LOSJGSFVSA-N

Asimadoline (EMD-61753) is an experimental drug which acts as a peripherally selective κ-opioid receptor (KOR) agonist. Because of its low penetration across the blood–brain barrier, asimadoline lacks the psychotomimetic effects of centrally acting KOR agonists, and consequently was thought to have potential for medical use. It has been studied as a possible treatment for irritable bowel syndrome, with reasonable efficacy seen in clinical trials, but it has never been approved or marketed.

== See also ==
- Eluxadoline
- Fedotozine
- Nalfurafine
- Trimebutine
