= Κ-opioid receptor =

Protein-coding gene in the species Homo sapiens, named for ketazocine

OPRK1
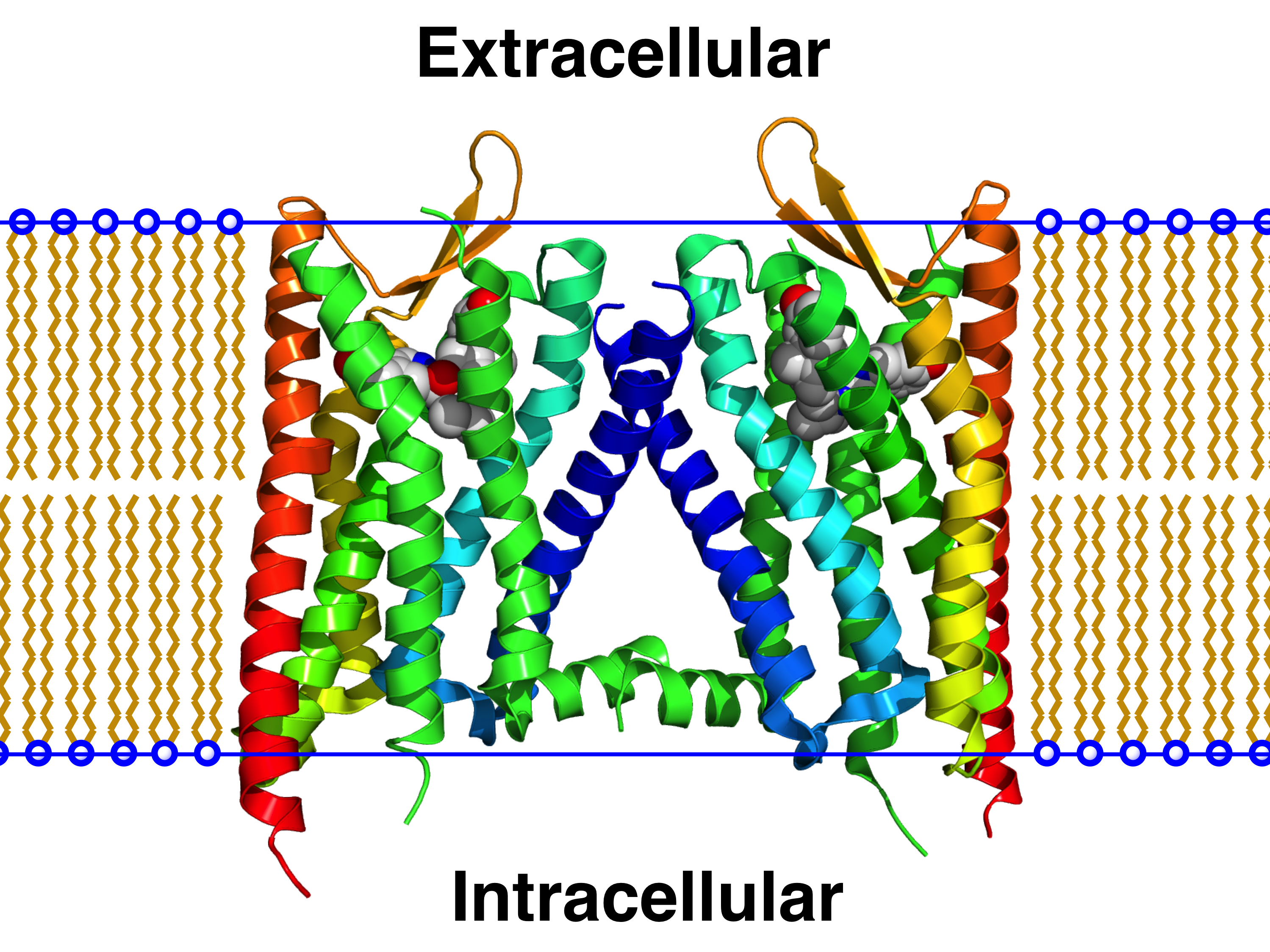

Identifiers
- Aliases: OPRK1, K-OR-1, KOR, KOR-1, OPRK, opioid receptor kappa 1, KOR1, KOP
- External IDs: OMIM: 165196; MGI: 97439; GeneCards: OPRK1
Available structures
PDB	Ortholog search: PDBe RCSB
PDB	List of PDB id codes 4DJH

Gene location (Human)
Chr.	Chromosome 8 (human)
Band	8q11.23	Start	53,225,724 bp
Band	8q11.23	End	53,251,637 bp

Gene location (Mouse)
Chr.	Chromosome 1 (mouse)
Band	1 A1|1 1.89 cM	Start	5,658,689 bp
Band	1 A1|1 1.89 cM	End	5,676,354 bp
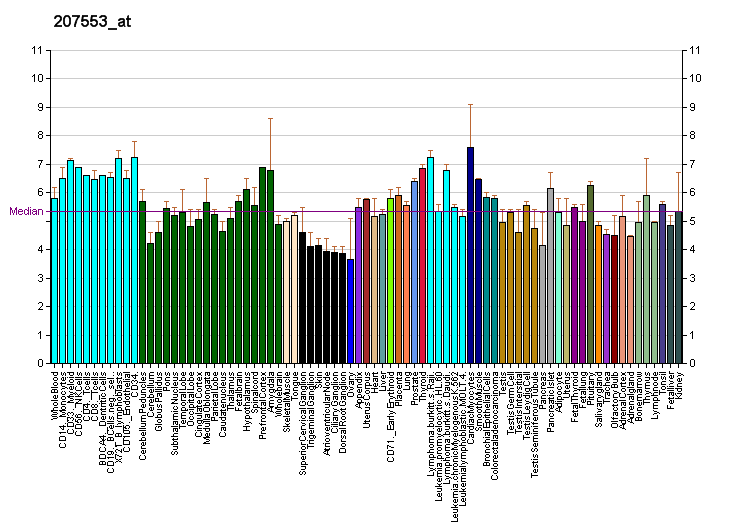
RNA expression pattern
Bgee	Human / Mouse (ortholog); Top expressed in: endothelial cell; pons; lateral nuclear group of thalamus; testicle; Brodmann area 23; entorhinal cortex; middle temporal gyrus; nucleus accumbens; spinal ganglia; prefrontal cortex / Top expressed in: decidua basalis; arachnoid mater; gastrula; superior frontal gyrus; wall of uterus; lumbar subsegment of spinal cord; embryo; submandibular gland; embryo; endometrium; More reference expression data
BioGPS	More reference expression data
Gene ontology
Molecular function	G protein-coupled receptor activity; neuropeptide binding; signal transducer activity; G protein-coupled opioid receptor activity; protein binding; dynorphin receptor activity; receptor serine/threonine kinase binding; peptide binding
Cellular component	axon terminus; integral component of membrane; perikaryon; membrane; synapse; integral component of plasma membrane; soma; dendrite; neuron projection; nucleus; cytosol; plasma membrane; integral component of synaptic vesicle membrane; integral component of postsynaptic membrane; integral component of presynaptic membrane
Biological process	positive regulation of p38MAPK cascade; response to cocaine; negative regulation of luteinizing hormone secretion; adenylate cyclase-inhibiting G protein-coupled receptor signaling pathway; sensory perception; regulation of sensory perception of pain; eating behavior; locomotory behavior; behavioral response to cocaine; sensory perception of temperature stimulus; estrous cycle; conditioned place preference; response to estrogen; response to insulin; phospholipase C-activating G protein-coupled receptor signaling pathway; response to morphine; regulation of saliva secretion; positive regulation of dopamine secretion; G protein-coupled opioid receptor signaling pathway; defense response to virus; maternal behavior; immune response; response to acrylamide; positive regulation of potassium ion transmembrane transport; sensory perception of pain; response to radiation; response to ethanol; neuropeptide signaling pathway; cellular response to lipopolysaccharide; positive regulation of locomotion; signal transduction; adenylate cyclase-inhibiting opioid receptor signaling pathway; chemical synaptic transmission; G protein-coupled receptor signaling pathway; animal behavior; positive regulation of eating behavior; cellular response to glucose stimulus
Sources:Amigo / QuickGO
Orthologs
Databases	NCBI: entry; OMA: entry
Species	Human	Mouse
Entrez	4986	18387
Ensembl	ENSG00000082556	ENSMUSG00000025905
UniProt	P41145	P33534
RefSeq (mRNA)	NM_001282904; NM_000912; NM_001318497	NM_001204371; NM_011011; NM_001318735
RefSeq (protein)	NP_000903; NP_001269833; NP_001305426	NP_001191300; NP_001305664; NP_035141
Location (UCSC)	Chr 8: 53.23 – 53.25 Mb	Chr 1: 5.66 – 5.68 Mb
PubMed search
- Wikidata
View/Edit Human	View/Edit Mouse

The κ-opioid receptor or kappa opioid receptor, abbreviated KOR or KOP for its ligand ketazocine, is a G protein-coupled receptor that is encoded by the OPRK1 gene in humans. The KOR is coupled to the G protein G_{i}/G_{0} and is among related receptors that bind opioid-like compounds in the brain and are responsible for mediating the effects of these compounds. These include altering nociception, mood, reward system, and motor control.

KOR is one of the two opioid receptors that bind dynorphin opioid peptides as the primary endogenous ligands, the other being newly deorphanized GPR139 receptor. In addition, oxytocin was found to be a positive allosteric modulator of KOR, and a variety of natural alkaloids, terpenoids, and synthetic ligands bind to the receptor.

Dysregulation of this receptor system has been implicated in multiple psychiatric disorders including: depressive and anxiety disorders, disorders of diminished motivation, schizophrenia, borderline personality disorder, bipolar disorder, and substance use disorder.

Ligands binding to the receptor have been approved to treat pruritus and manage pain. Aside from those indications they are investigated for various psychiatric disorders, irritable bowel syndrome, and acute stroke.

== Tissue distribution ==
=== Central nervous system ===
==== Brain ====
KORs are widely distributed throughout the brain. The claustrum represents the brain region with the highest density of KOR expression. Other CNS regions expressing moderate to high KOR densities include the prefrontal cortex, periaqueductal gray, dorsal raphe nuclei (dorsal), ventral tegmental area, substantia nigra, dorsal striatum (putamen, caudate), ventral striatum (nucleus accumbens, olfactory tubercle), amygdala, bed nucleus of the stria terminalis, hippocampus (pyramidal and molecular layers, granular cell layer of the dentate gyrus), hypothalamus, thalamus (centromedian, paraventricular, and centrolateral nuclei), locus coeruleus, spinal trigeminal nucleus, parabrachial nucleus, and solitary nucleus.

Positron emission tomography (PET) imaging studies with the KOR-selective radioligand [^{11}C]GR-103545 in non-human primates showed high binding potential (BP_{ND} > 1.3) in the pituitary gland, followed by insula, claustrum, and orbitofrontal cortex, with moderate binding (BP_{ND} 0.9–1.3) in nucleus accumbens, amygdala, and hippocampus. [^{3}H]bremazocine binding showed elevated densities along the ventral edge of the nucleus accumbens and ventral putamen regions.

There is evidence that distribution and/or function of this receptor may differ between sexes.

==== Spinal cord ====
In spinal cord, KOR is expressed in the substantia gelatinosa and superficial laminae of the dorsal horn, where they modulate thermal nociception and chemical viscelar pain. They are concentrated in the upper laminae of the dorsal horn (laminae I–III) and within the posterolateral tract. The highest density was localized within the inner segment of lamina II, forming a dense band immediately dorsal to lamina III. 53% of KOR binding sites in the superficial dorsal horn (laminae I–II) are localized presynaptically on primary afferent terminals, with the remainder distributed postsynaptically.

=== Peripheral nervous system ===
==== Dorsal root ganglia ====
KOR is present in dorsal root ganglia (DRG) in moderate expression levels in human tissue. KOR is expressed in peptidergic primary afferents genes encoding calcitonin gene-related peptide (CGRP) and substance P, as well as in populations of low-threshold mechanoreceptors that innervate hair follicles. In human DRG neurons, approximately 25% cells express OPRK1 mRNA.

==== Immune cells ====
In immune cells, KOR is distributed in specific leukocyte populations. Approximately 50% of resident peritoneal macrophages express KOR, while expression decreases during lymphocyte maturation, with less than 25% of splenic T-helper or T-cytotoxic lymphocytes and only 16% of splenic B lymphocytes displaying receptor expression.

=== Gastrointestinal tract ===
In the gastrointestinal tract, KOR is expressed on myenteric and submucosal plexus neurons, where they modulate intestinal motility and secretion. Both KOR and MOR mRNAs are expressed in all investigated gastrointestinal regions in one study, with the stomach and proximal colon displaying the highest expression levels, and the duodenum exhibiting the lowest. KOR in the proximal colon represented 40% of the amount found in the brain. A higher number of neurons expressing KOR-like immunoreactivity are visualized in the myenteric plexus with a smaller number in the submucosal plexus, unlike the distribution pattern of MORs.

=== Cardiovascular system ===
KORs are expressed in human cardiac tissue, including cardiomyocytes, where they exert negative inotropic and lusitropic effects through pertussis toxin-sensitive G_{i/o} protein signaling.

=== Renal system ===
Healthy human kidney expresses KOR, yet detailed cellular localization within specific nephron segments aren't investigated.

== Subtypes ==
Based on receptor binding studies, three variants of the KOR: κ_{1}, κ_{2}, and κ_{3} have been characterized via radioligand binding and regional CNS mapping. However, only one encoding cDNA has been cloned, hence these subtypes likely arise from interactions of the KOR protein with other membrane-associated proteins rather than gene duplication. Historically the understanding that KORs are encoded by a single gene reopened the question of how one receptor system could be involved in such a multiplicity of interactions and disparate profiles.

== Function ==
=== General ===
KOR agonism seems to functionally oppose multiple effects mediated by μ-opioid receptors (MOR) and δ-opioid receptors (DOR), including analgesia, tolerance, euphoria, and memory regulation. Activation of KOR by dynorphins during stress exposure has been shown to induce dysphoria, aversion, and negative affective states in both human and non-human subject. This contrasts with activation of MOR, which is associated with mood elevation and producing hedonic effects. Consequently, the KOR system has traditionally been conceptualized as mediating anti-reward processes and negative reinforcement, representing a functional counterpart to MOR in terms of behavioral and affective outcomes. However, recent research highlights a more nuanced role for KOR signaling, implicating it in a spectrum of complex behaviors and neural processes that extend beyond a strictly dichotomous and unidimensional frameworks, including functions independent of hedonic tone within reward processing.

Centrally active KOR agonists have distinct, atypical dissociative hallucinogenic effects, as exemplified by salvinorin A (the active constituent in Salvia divinorum). The experiences include: dissociation, incapacitation, psychotomimesis, profound alterations in interoception, somatic sensations, visual and auditory hallucinations, synesthesia (particularly visual-proprioceptive binding), sedation, analgesia, anti-inflammation, neuroprotection, memory impairment, anti-addiction, aversion, dysphoria, anxiogeny, both antidepressant and depressogenic effect.

==== Signaling bias ====
Main section: § Signaling dynamics

Many functional differences between KOR agonists can be explained by biased signaling, whereby different agonists preferentially activate distinct signaling pathways downstream of the receptor. Evidence suggests that G protein signaling primarily mediates the therapeutic analgesic and antipruritic effects of KOR agonists, whilst β-arrestin2-dependent signaling through p38 MAPK activation mediates adverse dysphoric, sedative, and aversive effects.

==== Limitations ====
Studying the exact functions mediated by KOR is limited by the non-selectivity and signaling biases of the compounds used in the research and naturally occurring in the human body. Dynorphin peptides, endogenous agonists of KOR, especially big dynorphin, are direct complex modulators of the NMDA receptor. Certain dynorphin peptides also have affinity for the MOR and DOR and influence other pathways that are not directly coupled to KOR. KOR activation in the context of in vivo stress responses could be biased for β-arrestin2 and other pathways related to dysphoria due to the presence of corticotropin-releasing hormone (CRF). Salvinorin A as well as other KOR agonists have been found to possess properties such as dopamine D_{2} receptor agonism with lower, but non-negligible affinity and potency. Salvinorin A is a balanced G protein and β-arrestin2 agonist.

=== Pain ===
Similarly to μ-opioid receptor (MOR), KOR activation produces antinociceptive effects. KOR agonists are potently analgesic and have been employed clinically for pain management, but they produce characteristic adverse effects which both limit their abuse potential and, unfortunately, their therapeutic utility.

The receptor mediates acute thermal and mechanical pain processing. The analgesic actions of KOR occur at both spinal and supraspinal sites. In the spinal cord, presynaptic activation suppresses nociceptive transmission through inhibition of calcium influx and reduction of neurotransmitter release from primary sensory neurons.

Neuropathic pain following peripheral nerve injury is accompanied by sustained elevation of dynorphin levels in the spinal dorsal horn, resulting in tonic KOR activation that contributes to pain inhibition. The prodynorphin-derived opioid system within the spinal cord exhibits both pronociceptive and antinociceptive functions. Acute KOR activation produces pain reversal and chronic stimulation leads to receptor tolerance and hyperalgesia with allodynia. Mechanisms such as activation of NMDA receptors on spinal interneurons, and increasing glutamate and substance P release from primary afferent terminals might play a role.

KOR also mediates the affective-motivational dimensions of pain. At the supraspinal level, KOR activation in the ventral tegmental area, periaqueductal gray, and other pain-modulatory nuclei influences both pain perception and pain-related motivated behavior. The engagement of KOR during chronic pain states, particularly neuropathic pain, has been implicated in the high comorbidity between chronic pain and mood disorders, as dynorphin-mediated KOR signaling in limbic and reward-related brain regions drives negative emotional states and anhedonia.

=== Memory ===
Receptor activation is linked to impairing multiple memory processes, including working memory, spatial learning, and fear memory consolidation, by inhibiting synaptic plasticity such as long-term potentiation (LTP) in regions like the amygdala and hippocampus. In models of amnesia, endogenous receptor activation leads to reactivation of memory traces, prolonging retention latency in inhibitory avoidance tasks, with antagonism often protecting against stress-induced deficits. Receptor activation by dynorphins also reduces the intensity of the emotional aspect of memories.

=== Neuroendocrine ===
KOR agonists increase serum prolactin levels by tonic inhibition of hypothalamic dopaminergic systems. This response occurs following administration of both centrally penetrating and peripherally restricted KOR agonists.

Activation of KOR produce diuretic effects through negative regulation of vasopressin, also known as antidiuretic hormone (ADH). This water diuresis is characterized by increased urine volume and decreased urine osmolality without prominent alterations in electrolyte excretion. Both centrally and peripherally acting KOR agonists promote diuresis through mechanisms including decreased antidiuretic hormone secretion from the hypothalamus and posterior pituitary, reduced renal responsiveness to antidiuretic hormone, and modulation of renal sympathetic nerve activity. KOR signaling in renal tissue may also modulate responses to metabolic stress and induce pathophysiological processes in kidney disease.

Activation of the receptor increases adrenocorticotropic hormone (ACTH) and cortisol levels in humans and non-human primates through activation of the hypothalamic-pituitary-adrenal axis (HPA). Administration of the selective agonist U50,488 dose-dependently stimulates ACTH and cortisol release, an effect specific to KOR activation and not observed following μ-opioid (MOR) or δ-opioid receptor (DOR) stimulation.

KOR exhibits coexpression with oxytocin and vasopressin in the paraventricular nucleus (PVN) and supraoptic nucleus (SON) of the hypothalamus. Functional KORs are present on nerve terminals of both oxytocin and vasopressin neurons in the rat neurohypophysis, where agonists inhibit potassium-evoked hormone release. Both dynorphin_{1-8} and (1–17) suppress stimulated oxytocin release from isolated neurosecretory endings, with effects on the initial and secondary peaks of hormone secretion, while exerting no influence on vasopressin release under similar conditions. These interactions extend to plasma hormone levels, where KOR agonists decrease circulating oxytocin concentrations, while antagonists increase oxytocin release, suggesting that KOR signaling mediates negative regulation of oxytocin secretion during stress or physiological challenges.

=== Mood and stress ===
The involvement of KOR in stress, as well as in consequences of chronic stress such as depression, anxiety, anhedonia, and modulating drug-seeking behavior, has been widely investigated. KOR is postulated to play an important and varied role in regulating various affective state and stress responses in humans through multiple complex processes. There have been numerous studies implicating KOR in pathology of various psychiatric disorders. One of the main premises for this investigation comes from the receptor activation causing cellular hyperpolarization and, in neurons, decreased neurotransmitter release through a reduction in calcium and increase in potassium conductance. Through these mechanisms, KORs are thought to regulate the release of many signaling molecules including: γ-aminobutyric acid (GABA), glutamate, serotonin, dopamine, norepinephrine. Results on exact influence on neuronal activity and neurotransmitter release vary in vivo. KOR activation elicits immediate hyperpolarization of dopamine neurons (in 1–2 min), followed by decreased dopamine release (5–10 min) and secondary effects on serotonin and glutamate (10–30 min).

==== Crf-dynorphin-kor cascade ====
Diverse stressors initiate CRF release which subsequently leads to dynorphin release and KOR activation in limbic circuits. This integrated stress response is mediated primarily by corticotropin-releasing factor (CRF), one of the main neuropeptide integrators of the stress response.

Physical stressors trigger CRF release from the hypothalamic paraventricular nucleus (PVN). Cold exposure provokes CRF secretion from the hypothalamus and produces increases in plasma glucocorticoids. Acute physical stressors such as forced swimming, inescapable footshock, and restraint stress similarly lead to CRF release. Acute stress induces rapid increases in plasma corticosterone levels that are dependent on CRF secretion. Intravenous CRF administration induces rapid increases in KOR phosphorylation in striatal, VTA, amygdaloid, hippocampal, and nucleus accumbens (NAcc) components of stress and anxiety circuits. These CRF-induced increases are absent in prodynorphin (PDYN) knockout mice. Social defeat stress model activates CRF and dynorphin. Learned helplessness also engages these systems. Fear conditioning and fear-related stress produce KOR-dependent behavioral responses through CRF receptor. The uncontrollability and inescapability of the stressor substantially augments the response. Even brief, non-intensive stressors produce significant neurobiological and behavioral effects when unpredictable and uncontrollable, whereas identical stressors with controllability demonstrate attenuated activation of stress systems.

CRF, produced in the PVN, activates CRF_{1} receptors and CRF_{2} receptors distributed across limbic circuits. CRF_{1} receptor activation, which mediates rapid and intense stress responses, triggers acute dynorphin release in limbic stress-responsive regions including the NAcc, basolateral amygdala, dorsal raphe nucleus (DRN), hippocampus, and bed nucleus of the stria terminalis (BNST). CRF_{2} receptor activation, generally associated with slower, later-phase stress response components, also induces dynorphin-dependent aversive responses such as conditioned place aversion (CPA). Subsequently dynorphin activates KORs expressed on GABAergic and dopaminergic neurons, encoding the aversive and dysphoric qualities of stress exposure.

Acutely stress-induced dynorphin release and KOR activation have evolutionarily adaptive functions. KOR-mediated analgesia facilitates physical escape responses to threat, and concurrent KOR-induced dysphoria and aversion promote avoidance and active coping. However, during the delayed temporal phase following acute stress exposure (hours to days), stress-induced KOR signaling initiates intracellular signaling cascades including p38 MAPK and extracellular signal-regulated kinases (ERK) which phosphorylate transcription factors such as cAMP response element-binding protein (CREB) and alter dynorphin and KOR gene expression itself, establishing a self-amplifying cycle.

Chronic social defeat stress produces a counterintuitive long-lasting downregulation of prodynorphin mRNA levels in the NAcc (occurring by day 10 of chronic exposure), and this downregulation is reversed by chronic treatment with standard antidepressant medication (imipramine). Despite this molecular downregulation, behavioral signs of stress-induced dysphoria, anhedonia, and anxiety persist and even intensify with repeated stress exposure, indicating that the coupling between dynorphin release and KOR phosphorylation, as well as the downstream consequences of KOR activation, may become sensitized through counter-adaptations in post-receptor signaling or in competing inhibitory circuits. This process involves: § Signaling after internalisation.

==== Serotonergic pathway regulation ====
KOR activation suppresses serotonergic signaling through multiple mechanisms, including regulation of the serotonin transporter (SERT) via intracellular kinase cascades. Dynorphin, released from local GABAergic neurons within reward-related regions, can bind to KORs expressed on serotonergic terminals projecting from the DRN to regions such as NAcc, prefrontal cortex, and other limbic structures associated with mood regulation. Agonist-induced binding to these receptors triggers rapid, concentration-dependent upregulation of SERT function through CaMKII and Akt. This increased trafficking of SERT to the plasma membrane, enhances serotonin reuptake via p38 MAPK-mediated recruitment, coupled with increased phosphorylation of the transporter protein, reducing serotonin's functional availability to the postsynaptic 5‑HT_{1A} and other 5‑HT receptor subtypes.

Beyond depleting serotonin levels, KOR agonism directly interferes with the signaling efficacy of 5-HT_{1A} receptor G-protein through competition as both receptors are coupled to G_{i/0}. The presence of KOR agonists depletes the available pool of the heterotrimeric G-proteins and the receptor's mutant variant I135L which has a high basal activity inhibits signaling mediated by the 5-HT_{1A}.

In the NAcc, stress-dependent upregulation of postsynaptic 5-HT_{1B} receptors co-expressed on direct pathway neurons expressing prodynorphin is an additional downstream mechanism. 5-HT_{1B} receptor, also coupled to G_{i/o} proteins, mediates serotonin-dependent inhibition of dopaminergic neuron excitability and modulate the balance between reward approach and behavioral inhibition. Chronic stress-induced elevation of 5-HT_{1B} expression in these accumbens neurons paradoxically increases sensitivity to dopamine suppression and amplifies the anhedonic phenotype despite the simultaneous reduction in baseline serotonin availability.

Collectively, under conditions of chronic stress, sustained KOR-mediated suppression could result in reduced release and enhanced uptake of serotonin, leading to diminished activation of postsynaptic serotonergic receptors in mesocorticolimbic ("hedonic") circuits and contributing to the dysphoric and anhedonic states associated with sustained KOR activation.

==== Dopaminergic pathway and reward suppression ====
The mesolimbic dopaminergic circuit functions as a substrate for KOR-regulated mood homeostasis. Dynorphin is synthesized and released by dopamine D_{1} receptor-expressing medium spiny neurons within the NAcc, establishing a local negative feedback loop that suppresses dopamine release. KOR activation on dopamine terminals inhibits dopamine release through multiple mechanisms: increased potassium conductance via G protein-coupled inward-rectifier potassium (GIRK) channels, suppression of calcium entry, activation of protein kinase C-β (PKCβ), c-Jun N-terminal kinase (JNK), and ERK, as well as facilitation of dopamine transporter (DAT) function through ERK1/2-dependent pathways that accelerate dopamine reuptake. Additionally, KOR activation on local dynorphin-expressing neurons produces presynaptic inhibition of both glutamatergic and GABAergic afferents onto D_{1} receptor-expressing medium spiny neurons, with preferential suppression of amygdala inputs to D_{1}-MSNs while facilitating integration of hippocampal/amygdalar inputs onto D_{2} receptor-expressing neurons through disinhibition.

In the caudal NAcc shell, KOR-induced dopamine suppression triggers anxiogenic behaviors accompanied by reduced locomotor activity. Conversely, in the rostral shell, KOR activation produces attenuated dopaminergic suppression with diminished aversive behavioral consequences. This topographic architecture extends to the NAcc core, where KOR-mediated dopamine inhibition similarly manifests with greater intensity in the caudal relative to rostral subregion. The DRN to ventral tegmental area (VTA) circuit is an additional stress-responsive pathway whereby prodynorphin-expressing neurons release dynorphin at dopaminergic terminals, enabling KOR-dependent suppression of dopamine neuron excitability during acute stressors.

=== Addiction ===
The KOR system is involved in increased drug-seeking behavior. KOR agonists have been investigated for their therapeutic potential in the treatment of addiction. and evidence points towards dynorphin peptides, the endogenous KOR agonists, to be the body's natural addiction control mechanism. Childhood stress and abuse are well-known predictors of drug abuse which is reflected in alterations of the MOR and KOR systems. In experimental "addiction" models the KOR has also been shown to influence stress-induced relapse to drug seeking behavior. For the drug-dependent individual, risk of relapse is a major obstacle to becoming drug-free. Recent reports demonstrated that KORs are required for stress-induced reinstatement of cocaine seeking.

The nucleus accumbens (NAcc) and broader striatum are among the brain regions most strongly associated with addiction, although other structures that project to and from the NAcc also play critical roles in addictive processes. Though many other changes occur, addiction is often characterized by the reduction in the availability of dopamine D_{2} receptors in the NAcc. In addition to decreasing NAcc D_{2} binding, cocaine is also known to produce a variety of changes to the primate brain such as increases of prodynorphin mRNA in caudate putamen and decreases of the same polypeptide in the hypothalamus. The administration of a KOR agonist produced an opposite effect, causing an increase in D_{2} receptor availability in the NAcc.

Additionally, while cocaine overdose victims showed a large increase in KORs (doubled) in the NAcc, KOR agonist administration is shown to be effective in decreasing cocaine seeking and self-administration. Furthermore, while cocaine abuse is associated with lowered prolactin response, KOR activation causes a release of prolactin, a hormone known for its important role in learning, neuronal plasticity and myelination.

It has also been reported that the KOR system is critical for stress-induced drug-seeking. In animal models, stress has been demonstrated to potentiate cocaine reward behavior in a kappa opioid-dependent manner. These effects are likely caused by stress-induced drug craving that requires activation of the KOR system. Although seemingly paradoxical, it is well known that drug taking results in a change from homeostasis to allostasis. It has been suggested that withdrawal-induced dysphoria or stress-induced dysphoria may act as a driving force by which the individual seeks alleviation via drug taking. The rewarding properties of drug are altered, and it is clear KOR activation following stress modulates the valence of drug to increase its rewarding properties and cause potentiation of reward behavior, or reinstatement to drug seeking. The stress-induced activation of KORs is likely due to multiple signaling mechanisms. The effects of KOR agonism on dopamine systems are well documented, and recent work also implicates the p38 MAPK cascade and pCREB in KOR-dependent behaviors.

The predominant drugs of abuse examined have been cocaine (44%), ethanol (35%), and opioids (24%). As these are different classes of drugs of abuse working through different receptors (increasing dopamine directly and indirectly, respectively), albeit in the same systems, they produce functionally different responses. Pharmacological activation of KOR can have marked effects in any of the psychiatric disorders (clinical depression, bipolar disorder, anxiety disorder, etc.) as well as various neurological disorders (i.e. Parkinson's disease and Huntington's disease). Not only are genetic differences in dynorphin receptor expression a marker for alcohol dependence, but a single dose of a KOR antagonist markedly increased alcohol consumption in rats. There are numerous studies that reflect a reduction in self-administration of alcohol, and heroin dependence has also been shown to be effectively treated with KOR agonism by reducing the immediate rewarding effects and by causing the curative effect of upregulation (increased production) of MORs that have been downregulated during opioid abuse.

The anti-rewarding properties of KOR agonists are mediated through both chronic and acute effects. The immediate effect of KOR agonism leads to reduction of dopamine release in the NAcc during self-administration of cocaine and, over the chronic period, upregulates receptors that have been downregulated during substance abuse such as the MOR and the D_{2} receptor. These receptors modulate the release of other neurochemicals such as serotonin in the case of MOR agonists, and acetylcholine in the case of D_{2}. These changes can account for the physical and psychological remission of the pathology of addiction. The longer effects of KOR agonism (30 minutes or greater) have been linked to KOR-dependent stress-induced potentiation and reinstatement of drug seeking. It is hypothesized that these behaviors are mediated by KOR-dependent modulation of dopamine, serotonin, or norepinephrine and/or via activation of downstream signal transduction pathways.

Of significant note, while KOR activation blocks many of the behavioral and neurochemical responses elicited by drugs of abuse as stated above. These results are indicative of the KOR induced negative affective states counteracting the rewarding effects of drugs of abuse. Implicating the KOR/dynorphin system as an anti-reward system, supported by the role of KOR signaling and stress, mediating both stress-induced potentiation of drug reward and stress-induced reinstatement of seeking behavior. This in turn addresses what was thought to be paradoxical above. That is, rather, KOR signaling is activated/upregulated by stress, drugs of abuse and agonist administration - resulting in negative affective state. As such drug addiction is maintained by avoidance of negative affective states in stress, craving, and drug withdrawal. Consistent with KOR induced negative affective states and role in drug addiction, KOR antagonists are efficacious at blocking negative affect induced by drug withdrawal and at decreasing escalated drug intake in pre-clinical trial involving extended drug access.

Traditional models of KOR function in drug addiction have postulated that KOR signaling is associated with dysphoria and aversion, thought to underlie the stress-induced exacerbation of addiction. However, recent research in animal models has proposed alternative models, suggesting that KOR-mediated responses may not act directly on negative valence systems but modulate related processes such as novelty processing. Studies in humans came to similar conclusions that KORs may modulate various aspects of reward processing in a manner that is independent of the hedonic valence traditionally ascribed to them. This broadens the potential understanding of KORs in addiction beyond a unidimensional framework, implicating their role in complex behaviors and treatment approaches that do not align strictly with stress or aversion. These emerging perspectives may inform the development of novel pharmacotherapies targeting KORs for the treatment of substance use disorders, as they highlight the receptor's multifaceted role in addiction.

=== Consciousness and altered states ===
==== Claustral theories ====
The claustrum is the region of the brain in which the KOR is most densely expressed. Historically, it has been proposed on the basis of the claustrum's structural and connectivity characteristics that this region orchestrates diverse brain functions and serves as a critical substrate for consciousness. Clinical observations supported this hypothesis: lesions of the claustrum in humans are associated with disruption of consciousness and cognition, and electrical stimulation of the insula-claustrum border has been found to produce immediate loss of consciousness in humans, with recovery upon cessation of stimulation. Earlier theories proposed that inhibition of the claustrum (as well as, "additionally, the deep layers of the cortex, mainly in prefrontal areas") by activation of KORs in these areas is primarily responsible for the profound consciousness-altering atypical dissociative hallucinogen effects of salvinorin A and other KOR agonists.

According to Addy et al.:

Theories suggest the claustrum may act to bind and integrate multisensory information, or else to encode sensory stimuli as salient or nonsalient (Mathur, 2014). One theory suggests the claustrum harmonizes and coordinates activity in various parts of the cortex, leading to the seamless integrated nature of subjective conscious experience (Crick and Koch, 2005; Stiefel et al., 2014). Disrupting claustral activity may lead to conscious experiences of disintegrated or unusually bound sensory information, perhaps including synesthesia. Such theories are in part corroborated by the fact that [salvia divinorum], which functions almost exclusively on the KOR system, can cause consciousness to be decoupled from external sensory input, leading to experiencing other environments and locations, perceiving other "beings" besides those actually in the room, and forgetting oneself and one's body in the experience.

From this perspective, disrupting claustral activity might lead to conscious experiences of disintegrated or unusually bound sensory information, including synesthesia. However, even early formulations acknowledged that their assumptions are merely tentative and that "KORs are not exclusive to the claustrum; there is also a fairly high density of receptors located in the prefrontal cortex, hippocampus, nucleus accumbens and putamen", and that "disruptions to other brain regions could also explain the consciousness-altering effects [of salvinorin A]".

==== Current neuroimaging evidence ====
The task of elucidating the exact role of claustrum in mediating sensory information and conscioussness remains a topic of active debate. And findings on whether distruptions of claustral activity lead to the loss of consciousness are conflicting.

Recent imaging studies have confirmed the suspected complexity and multi-regional character of specifically KOR-mediated alterations, and argued that the neural substrates involve cortico-thalamic integration and default mode network (DMN) disruption rather than claustrum-centric mechanism. Salvinorin A induces decreases in default mode network connectivity, specifically within the medial prefrontal cortex and posterior cingulate cortex and increased between-network connectivity with reduced dynamic connectivity stability. While both salvinorin A and psilocybin attenuate default mode network connectivity, their effects on thalamocortical networks differ; salvinorin A-induced thalamic modulation is independent of 5-HT_{2A} receptor activation.

The thalamus, especially the centromedian, paraventricular, and centrolateral nucleus, expresses high KOR density and mediates cortical arousal, viscero-limbic integration, and relay of sensory and interoceptive information to cortical processing hierarchies. KOR activation within these thalamic nuclei reduces the relay of exteroceptive and interoceptive information to the cortex, producing the characteristic dissociation from external reality and loss of contact with self-representation and body schema. Salvinorin A induces prominent auditory phenomena and gating of audio-visual information at the perceptual threshold, coupled with unusual modifications of interoceptive awareness and body ownership that exhibit inverted-U-shaped dose-response relationship. Low to moderate doses enhance sensations and perceived body-safety, whereas high doses produce depersonalization, loss of body awareness, out-of-body experiences, and subjective feelings of existing in alternative spatial or dimensional realities, sometimes as objects or alternatively other living organisms.

KOR activation also suppresses activity in sensory-integration regions, including parietal and temporal areas involved in body schema codification and multisensory binding, whilst simultaneously disrupting medial prefrontal cortex-mediated self-referential processing within the DMN. The claustrum is embedded within cortico-claustro-cortical loops that depend on maintained thalamic-cortical communication; consequently, thalamic KOR activation may disrupt claustral function indirectly through compromised afferent and efferent signaling rather than through direct local inhibition. Collectively, it is likely that KOR-mediated experiences of dimensionality alterations, synesthesia, and modified temporal perception represent emergent properties of disrupted hierarchical sensory integration at thalamic and cortical levels coupled with claustrum activity rather than direct consequences of that single region or modulation of its pathways.

=== Heart ===
In the cardiovascular system, KOR activation produces negative inotropic and lusitropic effects in cardiac tissue through pertussis toxin-sensitive G_{i/o} protein signaling. KOR activation during myocardial infarction reperfusion reduces infarct size through ERK1/2-dependent mechanisms, suggesting cardioprotective effects. In cardiomyopathic hearts, KOR-mediated cardiac depression is augmented through increased inhibition of cAMP accumulation and decreased amplitude of systolic Ca^{2+} transients. Ventricular arrhythmias resulting from administration of certain antagonists are attributed to the presence of KORs in the heart. Cardiomyopathic hamster hearts show augmented negative inotropic responses to KOR agonists in heart failure.

=== Other ===
A variety of other effects of KOR are known:

- KOR agonist administration reduces both NREM and REM sleep while increasing sleep fragmentation across the sleep-wake cycle.
- Peripheral KOR activation drives sensory responses including cold allodynia and mechanical hypersensitivity through mechanisms distinct from central effects.
- In a mouse model, agonism of inhibitory, GABAergic KOR-containing neurons in the rostral ventromedial medulla activates a top-down mechanism of inhibiting pain and itch perception from the spinal cord simultaneously.
- KOR activation modulates immune cell trafficking, cytokine production, and inflammatory responses, implicating peripheral opioidergic signaling in immunoregulation.
- KOR agonists suppress itching, and the selective KOR agonist nalfurafine is used clinically as an antipruritic.
- KOR agonism is neuroprotective against hypoxia/ischemia in multiple experimental models.
- The selective KOR agonist U-50488 protected rats against supramaximal electroshock seizures, indicating that KOR agonism may have anticonvulsant effects.

== Ligands ==
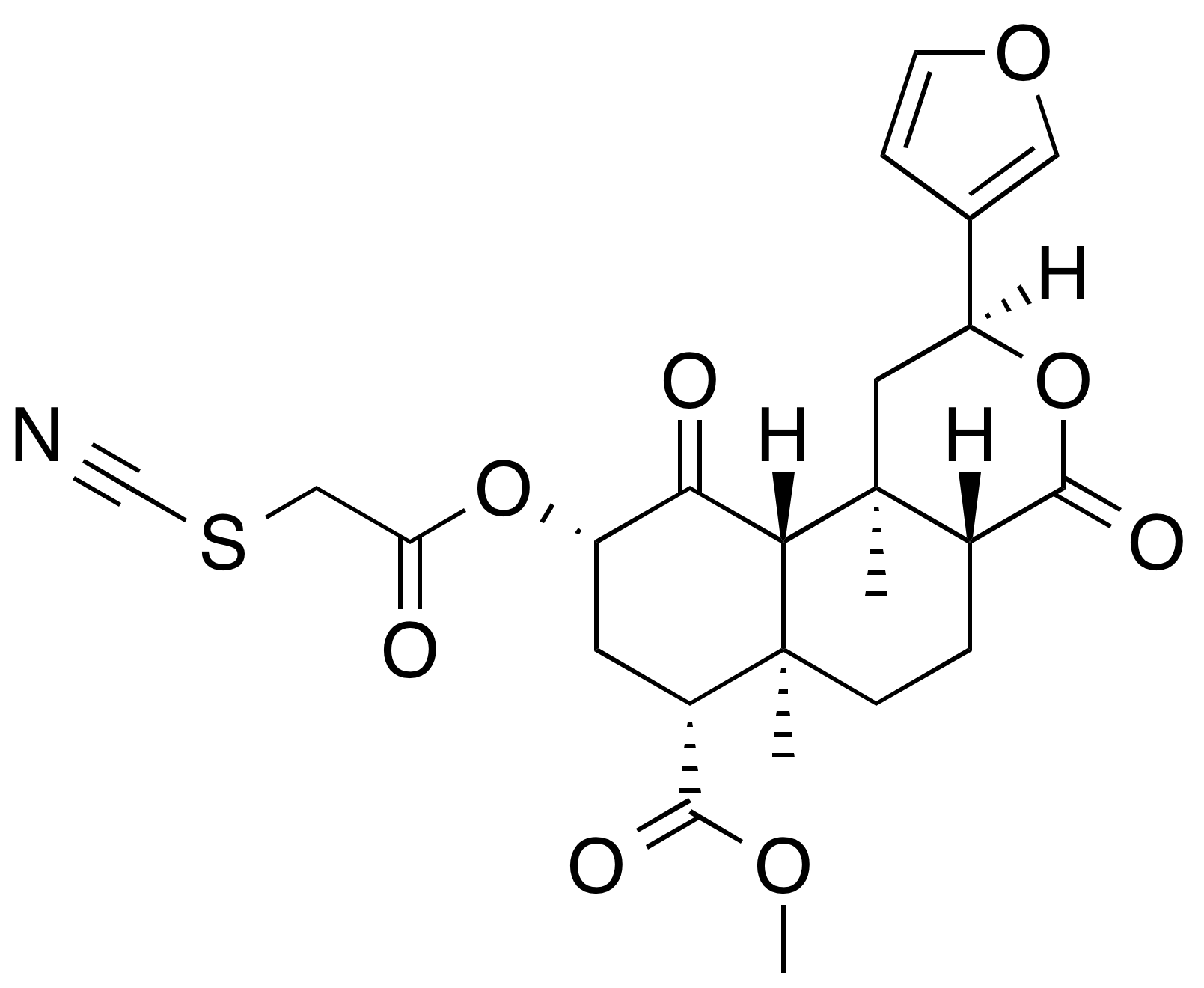
22-Thiocyanatosalvinorin A (RB-64) is a functionally-selective κ-opioid receptor agonist.

=== Agonists ===
The synthetic opioid ketazocine and terpenoid natural product salvinorin A are potent and selective KOR agonists. The KOR also mediates the dysphoria and hallucinations seen with opioids such as pentazocine.

Benzomorphans

- Alazocine – partial agonist
- BPHA
- Bremazocine – highly selective
- 8-Carboxamidocyclazocine
- Cyclazocine – partial agonist
- Ketazocine
- MCBPHA
- MCPPHA – moderately biased for G protein
- Metazocine – partial agonist
- MR-2034
- Pentazocine – partial agonist
- Phenazocine – partial agonist

Morphinans

- 6'-Guanidinonaltrindole (6'-GNTI) – biased ligand: G protein agonist, β-arrestin antagonist
- Butorphan – full agonist
- Butorphanol – partial agonist
- Cebranopadol – partial agonist
- Cyclorphan – full agonist
- Diprenorphine – non-selective, partial agonist
- Etorphine – non-selective
- Levallorphan
- Levomethorphan
- Levorphanol
- Morphine – alkaloid
- Nalbuphine – partial agonist
- Nalfurafine – full agonist, atypical agonist (possibly biased or subtype-selective)
- Nalmefene – partial agonist
- Nalodeine
- Nalorphine – partial agonist
- Norbuprenorphine – partial agonist, peripherally-selective metabolite of buprenorphine
- Norbuprenorphine-3-glucuronide – likely partial agonist, peripherally-selective metabolite of buprenorphine
- Oxilorphan – partial agonist
- Oxycodone – selective for κ_{2b} subtype
- Proxorphan – partial agonist
- Samidorphan – non-selective, weak partial agonist
- Xorphanol – partial agonist

Arylacetamides

- Asimadoline – peripherally-selective
- BRL-52537
- Eluxadoline
- Enadoline
- GR-89696 – selective for κ_{2}
- GR-103545
- ICI-204,448 – peripherally-selective
- ICI-199,441
- LPK-26 – highly selective
- MB-1C-OH
- Niravoline
- N-MPPP
- Spiradoline
- U-50,488
- U-54,494A
- U-69,593

Peptides (endo-/exogenous)

- CR665 – peripherally-selective
- Difelikefalin (CR845) – peripherally-selective
- Dynorphins (dynorphin A, dynorphin B, big dynorphin)
- MP1104
- LOR17

Terpenoids

- Erinacine E
- Menthol
- RB-64 – G protein biased agonist with a bias factor of 96; β-arrestin antagonist
- Salvinorin A – naturally-occurring
- 16-Bromo Salvinorin A
- 16-Ethynyl Salvinorin A – selective
- 2-Methoxymethyl salvinorin B – and its ethoxymethyl and fluoroethoxymethyl homologues

Others/unsorted

- 4-Allyl-6-oxa-noribogainalog
- Apadoline
- Collybolide – naturally-occurring
- Fedotozine – peripherally specific
- GM-3009 – noribogaine analogue
- HS665
- HS666
- HZ-2
- Ibogaine – alkaloid
- Ketamine (weak)
- MEB-1170
- Noribogaine – non-selective, biased ligand: G protein agonist, β-arrestin antagonist
- Oxa-noribogaine
- Tifluadom – (atypical) benzodiazepine
- Mirtazapine – partial agonist at high concentrations
- KSC-12-192 – selective, biased ligand: G protein agonist, β-arrestin antagonist

Nalfurafine (Remitch), which was introduced in 2009, is the first selective KOR agonist to enter clinical use.

=== Antagonists ===
- 5'-Acetamidinoethylnaltrindole (ANTI) – selective
- 5'-Guanidinonaltrindole (5'-GNTI) – selective, long-acting
- 6'-Guanidinonaltrindole (6'-GNTI) – biased ligand: G protein agonist, β-arrestin antagonist
- Amentoflavone – non-selective; naturally-occurring
- AT-076 – non-selective, likely long acting; JDTic analogue
- Aticaprant – selective, short-acting
- Binaltorphimine – selective, long-acting
- BU09059 – selective, short-acting; JDTic analogue
- Buprenorphine – non-selective; silent antagonist or weak partial agonist, depending on source
- Dezocine – non-selective; silent antagonist
- DIPPA – selective, long-acting
- Icalcaprant (CVL-354) – selective, short-acting
- JDTic – selective, long-acting
- KSC-12-192 - selective, biased ligand: G protein agonist, β-arrestin antagonist
- LY-255582 - non-selective
- LY-2459989 – selective, short-acting
- LY-2795050 – selective, short-acting
- Methylnaltrexone – non-selective
- ML190 – selective
- ML350 – selective, short-acting
- MR-2266 – non-selective
- Naloxone – non-selective
- Naltrexone – non-selective
- Navacaprant - selective
- Noribogaine – non-selective; naturally occurring; biased ligand: G protein agonist, β-arrestin antagonist
- Norbinaltorphimine – selective, long-acting
- Pawhuskin A – selective; naturally-occurring
- PF-4455242 – selective, short-acting
- Quadazocine – non-selective; silent antagonist; preference for κ_{2}
- RB-64 (22-thiocyanatosalvinorin A) – G protein biased agonist with a bias factor of 96; β-arrestin antagonist
- Zyklophin – selective peptide antagonist; dynorphin A analogue

=== Allosteric modulators ===
==== Positive allosteric modulators ====
- Oxytocin – endogenous, selective for G protein, also a μ-opioid receptors (MOR) positive allosteric modulator
- BMS-986187 – also a δ-opioid receptor (DOR) positive allosteric modulator

==== Negative allosteric modulators ====
- c[D-Trp-Phe-β-Ala-β-Ala]

== Genetics ==
The human OPRK1 gene is located on chromosome 8 and comprises four exons separated by three introns, spanning approximately 25 kilobases. The gene utilizes at least three transcription initiation sites, generating mRNAs with 5′-UTRs of 215–299 nucleotides, with the predominant isoform containing 238 nucleotides of 5′-UTR sequence. The exon-intron organization is conserved between human, mouse, and rat OPRK1 genes.

=== Polymorphisms ===
Single nucleotide polymorphisms (SNPs) genetic variations within OPRK1, have been associated with susceptibility to substance use disorders and stress-related behaviors. The G36T SNP (rs1051660) is more frequent in heroin-dependent individuals compared to healthy controls. Other study found an association of OPRK1 variants with cocaine dependence and relapse susceptibility.

=== Epigenetics ===
==== Early life stress ====
Epigenetic modifications including DNA methylation and histone acetylation regulate OPRK1 gene expression in response to environmental factors such as early life stress and psychological trauma. Decreased DNA methylation in intron 2 of OPRK1, functioning as a gene enhancer, has been observed in the anterior insula of individuals with histories of childhood abuse, which correlates with altered receptor expression and stress responsivity.

Postmortem samples from suicide completers with a history of severe child abuse (CA) had higher rates of KOR downregulation relative to controls and suicide completers without CA history, an effect not accompanied by alterations in multiple other genes. Hypomethylation of OPRK1 intron 2 was associated with the CA group, as low levels of DNA methylation facilitate glucocorticoid binding and subsequent regulation of OPRK1 transcription. Additionally, a specific insertion deletion (INDEL) polymorphism, rs35566036, in the OPRK1 promoter region occurred more frequently in suicide completers with major depressive disorder relative to healthy controls.

==== Borderline personality disorder ====
Similar epigenetic alterations in OPRK1 methylation patterns have been linked to borderline personality disorder (BPD), where an imbalance between opioid receptor systems could cause symptoms such as chronic dysphoria, suicidality, and emotional instability. In individuals with BPD, decreased DNA methylation (hypomethylation) in a differentially methylated region (DMR) located within the promoter region, specifically at a cluster of five adjacent CpG sites (CG34–CG38) positioned immediately upstream of core CpG islands (CGI-1 and CGI-2), results in enhanced gene transcription and elevated KOR expression.

The DMR hypomethylation in BPD is strategically positioned on the "falling slope" of the gene's methylation gap; a transition zone between the sparsely methylated CpG island promoter and densely methylated downstream regions. This location amplifies the functional consequences of hypomethylation by progressively steepening the methylation gradient, further facilitating transcription initiation at multiple transcription start sites (TSS) distributed throughout the CGI promoter region. Consequently, the decreased methylation rates in the DMR are associated with increased OPRK1 mRNA transcription and heightened KOR protein expression in peripheral white blood cells and, by extension, in central brain regions involved in emotion regulation.

Symptom severity in BPD correlates with DMR hypomethylation levels. As DMR methylation rates decrease (become more hypomethylated), BPD symptom severity measured by the Borderline Symptom List (BSL-23) increases. Additionally, heightened trait impulsivity, measured by the Barratt Impulsivity Scale, and particularly its motor impulsivity subscale, shows inverse relationships with DMR methylation levels.

The epigenetic imbalance may also impact social attachment and interpersonal functioning through effects on mu-opioid receptor (MOR). Childhood neglect produces chronic basal understimulation of MORs, which mediate reward and social motivation. Paradoxically, prolonged MOR understimulation may trigger compensatory MOR upregulation in regions such as the amygdala and orbitofrontal cortex. This MOR hypersensitization, with its heightened responsivity to negative affective stimuli, may in turn provoke strong counter-activating KOR responses, resulting in the increased OPRK1 expression observed epigenetically. This KOR-MOR imbalance, where relative KOR overactivity combines with contextually inappropriate MOR hyperexcitability, likely affects BPD's dysregulation of interpersonal relationships and affective instability.

==== Substances ====
===== Alcohol =====
Repeated alcohol exposure alters both DNA methylation and hydroxymethylation of the OPRK1 promoter in the nucleus accumbens, a key reward centre in alcohol-preferring rodent models. Chronic intermittent ethanol exposure reduces both 5-methylcytosine and 5-hydroxymethylcytosine percentages in the OPRK1 promoter, leading to changes in receptor expression correlated with addiction-related motivational and reward behaviours.

===== Stimulants =====
Cocaine and methamphetamine exposure induce epigenetic modifications of the OPRK1 and PDYN loci through both histone remodeling and DNA methylation pathways. Acute cocaine and methamphetamine increase histone H4 acetylation and histone acetyltransferase (HAT) activity in the striatum, facilitating increased PDYN and OPRK1 transcription that initiates dynorphin-mediated counter-inhibition of dopamine release. This acute epigenetic activation could be interpreted as a compensatory mechanism attempting to restore dopaminergic homeostasis during drug-induced dopaminergic overstimulation.

In chronic context cocaine and methamphetamine exposure reverse this epigenetic profile through increased DNA methyltransferase (DNMT) activity and histone deacetylase (HDAC)-mediated repression of plasticity genes, including decreased OPRK1 transcription. Epigenetic silencing of adaptability genes consolidates compulsive drug-seeking behaviour whilst simultaneously dysregulating the KOR-mediated feedback system, facilitating withdrawal-related dysphoria and relapse vulnerability.

===== Opioids =====
In humans addicted to opioids, epigenetic modifications of the OPRK1 gene, including altered DNA methylation profiles in peripheral blood cells, correlate with substance use severity and withdrawal symptoms.

==== Gastrointenstinal tract ====
Age-related changes in OPRK1 gene expression were observed in mouse gastrointestinal tract, with mRNA expression significantly decreased in the distal ileum in 12-month-old mice compared to 6-month-old animals, though no statistically significant differences were detected in the stomach and colon. Protein expression of dynorphin in the colon was lower in older mice.

== Receptor oligomers ==
Heteromerization with other G protein-coupled receptors (GPCRs) produces complexes with differing ligand selectivity and signaling properties. They show altered G protein coupling, receptor trafficking, and tissue distribution compared to homodimers. Targeting specific KOR-containing heteromers with bivalent ligands may yield analgesics with fewer dysphoric effects, which could be relevant for addiction research and therapy.

Heterodimer of KOR with δ-opioid receptor (DOR) is proposed to underlie the pharmacologically defined κ1 subtype and explain region-specific effects like analgesia or dysphoria. Besides KOR-DOR the receptor heterodimerizes with μ-opioid (preferentially forms in females), nociceptin (NOP), orexin receptor 1 (OX_{1}), dopamine transporter (DAT), neurotensin 1, bradykinin B2, beta-2 adrenergic receptors, GPR88. With others possible but not yet definitely established.

== Signaling dynamics ==
=== Transduction ===
Upon activation by dynorphin, KORs bind to pertussis toxin-sensitive heterotrimeric G_{αi} proteins, initiating a pattern of signaling events within the cell, including inhibition of adenylate cyclase activity, increase in K^{+} conductance, decrease in calcium conductance, emptying of intracellular calcium storage. KOR activation is coupled to the G protein G_{i}/G_{0}, which subsequently increases phosphodiesterase activity. Phosphodiesterases break down cAMP, producing an inhibitory effect in neurons. KORs also couple to inward-rectifier potassium and to N-type calcium ion channels. Studies have also shown that agonist-induced stimulation of the KOR, like other G-protein coupled receptors, can result in the activation of mitogen-activated protein kinases (MAPK). These include extracellular signal-regulated kinase (ERK), p38 mitogen-activated protein kinases, and c-Jun N-terminal kinases.

=== Interactions ===
KOR has been shown to interact with sodium-hydrogen antiporter 3 regulator 1, ubiquitin C, 5-HT1A receptor, and RGS12.

=== G protein and β-arrestin pathways ===
KOR activation initiates both G protein-mediated and β-arrestin-dependent signaling pathways. Following agonist binding, activated G_{αi} subunits inhibit adenylyl cyclase activity, whilst Gβγ dimers activate G protein-coupled inwardly rectifying potassium channels (GIRKs) and inhibit calcium channels. G protein signaling also initiates early-phase phosphorylation of ERK through Gβγ-mediated activation of phosphoinositide 3-kinase (PI3Ks).

After G protein activation, G protein-coupled receptor kinases (GRKs) phosphorylate the receptor, which promotes recruitment of β-arrestins. Their recruitment mediates receptor desensitization, internalization, and downregulation, whilst also initiating distinct signaling cascades independent of G protein activation. β-arrestin2 is the dominant isoform mediating KOR desensitization, β-arrestin1 recruitment to KOR is possible but appears weaker and less functionally significant. β-Arrestin2-mediated signaling includes late-phase ERK phosphorylation and activation of p38 MAPK and c-Jun N-terminal kinase (JNK).

Repeated stress produces dynorphin-dependent activation of both KOR and p38 MAPK within GABAergic neurons localized to the nucleus accumbens, prefrontal cortex, and hippocampus. This p38 activation is dependent upon G protein-coupled receptor kinase 3 (GRK3) and β-arrestin2 recruitment and occurs through Ser369 phosphorylation of KOR itself. Inhibition of p38 MAPK selectively blocks stress-induced immobility and conditioned place aversion while preserving analgesia and non-selective learning processes, isolating p38 signaling as specifically responsible for dysphoric-like behavioral responses.

Evidence suggests that G protein signaling mediates the therapeutic analgesic and antipruritic effects of KOR agonists, whilst β-arrestin2-dependent signaling through p38 MAPK activation mediates adverse dysphoric, sedative, and aversive effects. Experiments in β-arrestin2 knockout mice demonstrated that the antipruritic effects of KOR agonists are preserved in the absence of β-arrestin2, whilst conditioned place aversion requires both GRK3 and β-arrestin2.

=== Conformational states ===
Simulations identified three distinct active-state conformational states of KOR: the canonical active state, an alternative state, and an occluded state. The alternative state, characterized by specific transmembrane domain conformations, correlates with β-arrestin2-biased signaling. The occluded state, in which the intracellular portion of transmembrane helix 7 rotates clockwise toward transmembrane helix 2, appears to favor G protein coupling whilst disfavoring β-arrestin recruitment.

Specific residues within the receptor binding pocket differentially influence G protein versus β-arrestin signaling. Disruption of the ionic interaction by certain agonists increases the distance between the extracellular ends of transmembrane helices 5 and 6, contributing to ligand-specific transducer coupling preferences.

=== Signaling after internalisation ===
KOR undergoes agonist-mediated GRK-dependent phosphorylation followed by β-arrestin recruitment, initiating clathrin-mediated endocytosis. KOR trafficking differs compared to other opioid receptors. Whereas the μ-opioid receptor (MOR) contains a C-terminal LENL recycling motif that engages retromer complexes for rapid plasma membrane recycling, and the δ-opioid receptor (DOR) undergoes predominantly lysosomal degradation following internalization, KOR requires a PDZ domain-binding sequence for post-endocytic sorting. Following internalization, KOR rapidly accumulates in early endosomes, where it remains partially dissociated from β-arrestin, allowing continued G protein coupling and signaling in compartment-specific contexts.

KOR-mediated signaling persists within late endosomes and lysosomes despite agonist-induced translocation from the plasma membrane, representing a form of sustained "post-internalization" signaling distinct from plasma membrane coupling. Dynorphin A maintains prolonged adenylyl cyclase suppression when KOR is sequestered within late endosomal and lysosomal compartments, which suggests that dynorphin isoforms differentially stabilize intracellular receptor conformations suited to late-compartment signaling. This property distinguishes KOR from MOR, which primarily signals from endosomal compartments when β-arrestin-bound, and from classical recycling receptors that rapidly regain surface expression. The intracellular KOR signaling axis involves continued G_{i/o} coupling on late endosomal membranes, sustained suppression of adenylyl cyclase and cAMP production, and prolonged recruitment of ERK pathway components through Gβγ-dependent mechanisms, thereby establishing a biochemical niche for chronic dynorphin signaling distinct from acute plasma membrane responses. This signaling permits differential integration of intracellular second messenger systems and transcriptional responses compared to plasma membrane-restricted coupling.

== Clinical significance ==
=== Pain ===
KOR agonists have been clinically employed as analgesics, with examples including butorphanol, nalbuphine, levorphanol, levallorphan, pentazocine, phenazocine, and eptazocine. Unlike MOR agonists, KOR agonists do not cause respiratory depression and have lower abuse potential, but centrally-mediated side effects such as dysphoria, hallucinations, and dissociation have limited their clinical utility.

Nalorphine and nalmefene are dual MOR antagonists and KOR agonists used clinically as antidotes for opioid overdose, but the specific role of KOR activation to their efficacy remains uncertain as KOR agonists do not reverse respiratory depression induced by MOR activation and thus cannot serve as standalone antidotes for this purpose.

Peripherally selective KOR agonists display analgesic efficacy mediated through anti-inflammatory effects on immune cells and nociceptors. CR665 and difelikefalin (CR845, FE-202845) have been investigated clinically; marking the first peripherally-restricted KOR agonist to reach regulatory approval, though none have yet been approved specifically for pain indication. Recent evidence supports the therapeutic potential of mixed KOR/MOR agonists and KOR-biased ligands as adjuncts to conventional analgesics in inflammatory and cancer pain, with particular promise for chronic neuropathic pain syndromes.

=== Major depressive disorder ===
The mechanistic rationale for KOR antagonism in major depressive disorder (MDD) derives from the observation that chronic stress and depression are associated with higher activity of the KOR system. KOR activation suppresses dopamine release and prevents dopamine rebound after stress exposure, thereby leading to anhedonia and depressive phenotypes. KOR antagonists reverse this pathway by disinhibiting dopaminergic tone and restoring reward sensitivity. KOR-mediated upregulation of pro-inflammatory signaling in microglia likely drives the depression pathophysiology, and antagonism may provide benefits. The claustrum-prelimbic cortex circuit operates via dynorphin and KOR signaling to modulate cognitive and affective functions.

Buprenorphine/samidorphan (ALKS-5461) displayed antidepressant efficacy in randomized controlled trials as an adjunctive therapy and has shown durable effects with a favorable safety profile including low abuse potential and minimal withdrawal symptoms. A phase 2 study demonstrated significant reduction of depressive symptoms and improvement in anhedonia when aticaprant was added to existing antidepressant therapy. A phase 3 clinical trials (KOASTAL-1 and additional studies) of navacaprant failed to achieve statistically significant superiority over placebo across the broader MDD population, with its development discontinued for this purpose in early 2025.

Main sections: §§ Signaling after internalisation and Conformational states

The persistent signaling that is present after internalisation could be the reason for ineffectivity of common KOR antagonists given that they work on receptor's outer membrane. Antagonists also tend to preserves conformation states; in this case presumably "alternative state" due to the endogenous bias for the β-arrestin signaling during stress responses.

=== Anxiety disorders ===
KOR antagonists have demonstrated anxiolytic efficacy in preclinical stress models and early clinical evaluation. Early generation antagonists such as JDTic and nor-BNI produced anxiolytic-like effects in GAD, PTSD, and panic disorder models. However their long duration of action and off-target toxicities limited clinical development. Contemporary short-acting antagonists such as aticaprant are being evaluated for anxiety indications given their improved pharmacokinetic profiles and reduced toxicity burden.

=== Schizophrenia ===
Persistent KOR signaling has been implicated in the pathophysiology of schizophrenia, in the generation of both positive and negative symptoms, and as an explanation for treatment-resistant psychosis. Mechanistically, chronic KOR activation produces long-term sensitization of dopamine D_{2} receptors in the striatum, which manifests as supersensitized D2 receptor states that amplify phasic dopamine signaling and hyperresponsivity to dopaminergic stimuli. This mechanism could interact with the underlying excessive striatal dopamine transmission in schizophrenia, potentiating positive symptoms including delusions and hallucinations, and explaining why dopamine D_{2} receptor antagonists (antipsychotics) remain effective. Apart from striatal mechanisms, KOR signaling modulates cortical glutamate and GABA homeostasis through KOR activation on GABAergic terminals of dynorphin-expressing neurons in prefrontal cortex which suppresses GABA release and disrupting the balance of cortical inhibition-excitation that might drive cognitive dysfunction and negative symptoms. Thus, KOR antagonism may provide a complementary strategy to D_{2} antagonism by simultaneously reducing D_{2} receptor sensitization to normalize striatal dopamine responsivity and restoring cortical inhibition-excitation balance to ameliorate cognitive dysfunction. The receptor availability also predicts severity of anhedonia in schizophrenia.

=== Borderline personality disorder ===
Main section: § Borderline personality disorder

Recent epigenetic findings suggest that KOR antagonists, which block the hyperactive KOR system, might be a viable pharmacological approach for borderline personality disorder (BPD) treatment, particularly for anhedonia, suicidality, and dissociative symptoms. Current early evidence supports the efficacy of naltrexone and nalmefene in reducing suicidal ideation, non-suicidal self-injury, binge eating, and dissociation in patients with BPD.

=== Bipolar disorder ===
In a small clinical study, pentazocine, a KOR agonist, rapidly reduced acute manic symptoms in bipolar disorder patients. The therapeutic mechanism is postulated to involve KOR agonist-mediated suppression of excessive dopaminergic signaling in reward pathways and striatal circuits that drive manic hyperactivity and impulsivity. Complete desensitization of KOR renders the receptor unable to gate dopaminergic signaling, thereby lifting the inhibitory constraint and disinhibiting phasic dopamine and norepinephrine release. Temporary KOR sensitization during acute mania may reverse this disinhibition.

=== Addiction and withdrawal ===
Aticaprant was well-tolerated in cocaine use disorder (CUD) patients. A positron emission tomography (PET) study in CUD patients utilizing a KOR selective agonist [^{11}C]GR-103545 radioligand showed CUD individuals with higher KOR availability were more prone to stress-induced relapse. A subsequent PET scan following a three-day cocaine binge showed a decrease in KOR availability, interpreted as increased endogenous dynorphin competing with the radioligand at the KOR binding sites. These findings are in support of the negative affect state and further implicate the KOR/dynorphin system clinically and therapeutically relevant in humans with CUD. Taken together, in drug addiction the KOR system is implicated as a homeostatic mechanism to counteract the acute effects of drugs of abuse. Chronic drug use and stress up-regulate the system in turn leading to a dysregulated state which induces negative affective states and stress reactivity.

KOR agonists have also been investigated for their therapeutic potential in the treatment of addiction, particularly substance use disorders. Ibogaine, atypical KOR agonist with G-protein-biased signaling and complex pharmacodynamics involving multiple neurotransmitter systems. Ibogaine's primary active metabolite, noribogaine, acts as a moderate KOR agonist selective for G protein and a potent serotonin reuptake inhibitor. This mechanism, combined with activity at 5-HT_{2A}, 5-HT_{2C}, σ_{2}, and NMDA receptors, likely leads its anti-addictive effects. The precise extent to which KOR agonism underlies ibogaine's anti-addictive properties is unclear.

In animal models, ibogaine administration has been shown to reduce self-administration of opioids, stimulants, and alcohol, ameliorate withdrawal symptoms, and decrease drug-seeking behavior. A 2022 systematic review of 24 studies involving 705 participants found that both ibogaine and noribogaine show promise in treating substance use disorders and comorbid depressive symptoms.

=== Pruritus ===
KOR agonists suppress itching, and the selective KOR agonist nalfurafine is used clinically as an antipruritic. Peripheral agonist difelikefalin also have been approved in the US and Europe for moderate-to-severe pruritus.

=== Gut ===
Eluxadoline is a peripherally restricted KOR agonist as well as MOR agonist and DOR antagonist that has been approved for the treatment of diarrhea-predominant irritable bowel syndrome. Asimadoline and fedotozine are selective and similarly peripherally restricted KOR agonists that were also investigated for the treatment of irritable bowel syndrome and reportedly demonstrated at least some efficacy for this indication but were ultimately never marketed.

== See also ==
- δ-opioid receptor
- μ-opioid receptor
- Nociceptin receptor
- GPR139
