= C18H24Cl2N2O =

The molecular formula C_{18}H_{24}Cl_{2}N_{2}O (molar mass: 355.30 g/mol, exact mass: 354.1266 u) may refer to:

- BRL-52537
- LPK-26
