= GR-45809 =

Kappa opioid receptor agonist painkiller

Identifiers
- IUPAC name: 2-(3,4-Dichloro-phenyl)-1-(7-pyrrolidin-1-ylmethyl-1,4-dioxa-8-aza-spiro[4.5]dec-8-yl)-ethanone
- CAS Number: 138154-97-9
- PubChem CID: 9955378
- ChemSpider: 8130988

Chemical and physical data
- Formula: C_{20}H_{26}Cl_{2}N_{2}O_{3}
- Molar mass: 413.34 g·mol^{−1}
- 3D model (JSmol): Interactive image
- SMILES: C1CCN(C1)CC2CC3(CCN2C(=O)CC4=CC(=C(C=C4)Cl)Cl)OCCO3
- InChI: InChI=1S/C20H26Cl2N2O3/c21-17-4-3-15(11-18(17)22)12-19(25)24-8-5-20(26-9-10-27-20)13-16(24)14-23-6-1-2-7-23/h3-4,11,16H,1-2,5-10,12-14H2; Key:LWUQHEXXEFUHHQ-UHFFFAOYSA-N

GR-45809 is a kappa opioid receptor (KOR) agonist with use in the treatment of pain. It was developed over 30 years ago. It has a structure that is similar to ZT-52656A.
