= CR665 =

Names
- IUPAC name (R)-2-((R)-2-((R)-2-amino-3-phenylpropanamido)-3-phenylpropanamido)-N-((R)-5-guanidino-1-oxo-1-((pyridin-4-ylmethyl)amino)pentan-2-yl)hexanamide
- Other names CR 665; JNJ 38488502

Identifiers
CAS Number	228546-92-7
3D model (JSmol)	Interactive image
ChemSpider	32702094
PubChem CID	25030387
UNII	3BX9UG06GG
CompTox Dashboard (EPA)	DTXSID30177395
- InChI: InChI=1S/C36H49N9O4/c1-2-3-15-30(34(48)43-29(16-10-19-41-36(38)39)33(47)42-24-27-17-20-40-21-18-27)44-35(49)31(23-26-13-8-5-9-14-26)45-32(46)28(37)22-25-11-6-4-7-12-25/h4-9,11-14,17-18,20-21,28-31H,2-3,10,15-16,19,22-24,37H2,1H3,(H,42,47)(H,43,48)(H,44,49)(H,45,46)(H4,38,39,41)/t28-,29-,30-,31-/m1/s1 Key: DBOGGOVKHSCMNB-OMRVPHBLSA-N; InChI=1/C36H49N9O4/c1-2-3-15-30(34(48)43-29(16-10-19-41-36(38)39)33(47)42-24-27-17-20-40-21-18-27)44-35(49)31(23-26-13-8-5-9-14-26)45-32(46)28(37)22-25-11-6-4-7-12-25/h4-9,11-14,17-18,20-21,28-31H,2-3,10,15-16,19,22-24,37H2,1H3,(H,42,47)(H,43,48)(H,44,49)(H,45,46)(H4,38,39,41)/t28-,29-,30-,31-/m1/s1 Key: DBOGGOVKHSCMNB-OMRVPHBLBS
- SMILES: O=C(NCC1=CC=NC=C1)[C@H](NC([C@H](NC([C@@H](CC2=CC=CC=C2)NC([C@@H](CC3=CC=CC=C3)N)=O)=O)CCCC)=O)CCCNC(N)=N

Properties
Chemical formula	C_{36}H_{49}N_{9}O_{4}
Molar mass	671.847 g·mol^{−1}
- Except where otherwise noted, data are given for materials in their standard state (at 25 °C [77 °F], 100 kPa). Infobox references

CR665 (H-D-Phe-D-Phe-D-Nle-D-Arg-NH-4-Picolyl), also known by the previous developmental code names FE-200665 and JNJ-38488502, is an all D-amino acid peptide that acts as a peripherally restricted κ-opioid receptor agonist. The selectivity for FE 200665 is 1/16,900/84,600 for the human κ, μ, and δ opioid receptors, respectively. The dose of FE 200665 required to produce motor impairment (measure of CNS penetration) was 548 times higher than the dose required for antinociceptive activity. It is being developed for use by Cara Therapeutics under the code name CR665.

A small, blinded study was done in healthy humans to determine the analgesic effects. CR665 was dosed at 0.36 mg/kg I.V., and was compared to 15 mg oxycodone orally. CR665 had analgesic effects on visceral pain, but produced a hyperalgesic response in a skin pinch test.

== See also ==
- Difelikefalin (CR845)
