= C19H25Cl2N3O3 =

The molecular formula C_{19}H_{25}Cl_{2}N_{3}O_{3} (molar mass: 414.33 g/mol) may refer to:

- GR-89696
- GR-103545
