= KSC-12-192 =

Drug; KOR biased agonist

Clinical data
- Other names: "probe 1.1"
- ATC code: None

Identifiers
- IUPAC name: 2-[4-(furan-2-ylmethyl)-5-[[4-methyl-3-(trifluoromethyl)phenyl]methylsulfanyl]-1,2,4-triazol-3-yl]pyridine
- CAS Number: 1526944-32-0
- PubChem CID: 46245518
- IUPHAR/BPS: 9191
- ChemSpider: 58145205
- ChEMBL: ChEMBL4458783

Chemical and physical data
- Formula: C_{21}H_{17}F_{3}N_{4}OS
- Molar mass: 430.45 g·mol^{−1}
- 3D model (JSmol): Interactive image
- SMILES: CC1=C(C=C(C=C1)CSC2=NN=C(N2CC3=CC=CO3)C4=CC=CC=N4)C(F)(F)F
- InChI: InChI=1S/C21H17F3N4OS/c1-14-7-8-15(11-17(14)21(22,23)24)13-30-20-27-26-19(18-6-2-3-9-25-18)28(20)12-16-5-4-10-29-16/h2-11H,12-13H2,1H3; Key:OQJGZGAYSCWFCK-UHFFFAOYSA-N

KSC-12-192 is a drug that is used in scientific research to study the κ-opioid receptor, where it acts as a biased agonist.

KSC-12-192 preferentially activates G-protein coupling over β-arrestin 2 recruitment in vitro, an intrinsic activity shared with many other KOR ligands developed to separate KOR-mediated analgesia from accompanying dysphoria.

Compared with most of the known KOR G-protein biased agonists, KSC-12-192 and its parent compound ML138 do not exhibit stereoisomerism.

Out of a range of tested compounds with the same substituted triazole scaffold (see table), KSC-12-192 had the highest reported in vitro potency as a human KOR agonist (EC_{50} = 31nM).

Scaffold	Identifiers		X	R_{1}	R_{2}	R_{3}
		KSC-12-192	O	H	CH_{3}	CF_{3}
	ML138	KSC-5-240	O	H	Cl	Cl
		KSC-12-193	S	H	CH_{3}	CF_{3}
		KSC-5-247G	S	H	Cl	Cl
		KSC-12-238-B5	O	CH_{3}	CH_{3}	CF_{3}
		KSC-12-238-B4	O	CH_{3}	Cl	Cl

== See also ==
- Ketazocine
- RB-64
- ICI-199,441
- Spiradoline
