= LY-2459989 =

Chemical compound

Clinical data
- Routes of administration: Oral, intravenous
- ATC code: None

Pharmacokinetic data
- Elimination half-life: 15 minutes (in rhesus monkeys)

Identifiers
- IUPAC name: 3-Fluoro-4-[4-[[(2S)-2-pyridin-3-ylpyrrolidin-1-yl]methyl]phenoxy]benzamide
- CAS Number: 2254067-61-1
- PubChem CID: 134819873
- ChemSpider: 81367627
- UNII: 2X23M5HP34
- ChEMBL: ChEMBL5499267
- CompTox Dashboard (EPA): DTXSID201045938

Chemical and physical data
- Formula: C_{23}H_{22}FN_{3}O_{2}
- Molar mass: 391.446 g·mol^{−1}
- 3D model (JSmol): Interactive image
- SMILES: NC(=O)c1ccc(Oc2ccc(CN3CCC[C@H]3c4cccnc4)cc2)c(F)c1
- InChI: InChI=1S/C23H22FN3O2/c24-20-13-17(23(25)28)7-10-22(20)29-19-8-5-16(6-9-19)15-27-12-2-4-21(27)18-3-1-11-26-14-18/h1,3,5-11,13-14,21H,2,4,12,15H2,(H2,25,28)/t21-/m0/s1; Key:DRGHCUTTXWIERB-NRFANRHFSA-N

LY-2459989 is a silent antagonist of the κ-opioid receptor (KOR) that has been developed by Eli Lilly as a radiotracer of that receptor, labeled either with carbon-11 or fluorine-18.

== Pharmacology ==
=== Pharmacokinetics ===
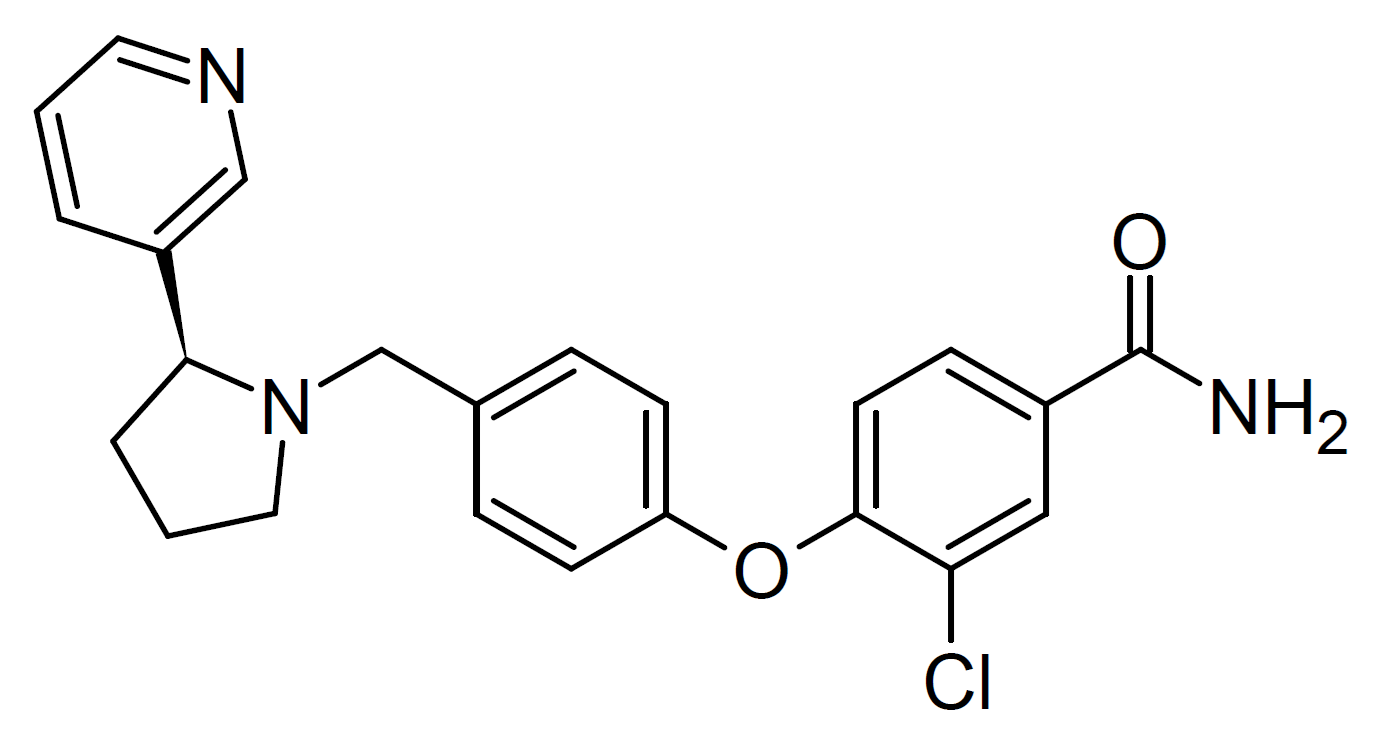
LY-2795050, CAS# 1346133-08-1

LY-2459989 exhibits greatly improved central nervous system permeation relative to LY-2795050, with brain levels approximately six times higher than those of its predecessor. The compound has a short duration of action, with only 25% of the compound remaining in serum 30 minutes post-injection in rhesus monkeys, making it an ideal agent for application in biomedical imaging, such as positron emission tomography (PET).

=== Pharmacodynamics ===
LY-2459989 possesses high affinity for the KOR (K_{i} = 0.18 nM) and is highly selective for it over the μ-opioid receptor (K_{i} = 7.68 nM) and the δ-opioid receptor (K_{i} = 91.3 nM), showing over 43-fold selectivity for the KOR relative to the other opioid receptors. LY-2459989 is a fluorine-containing analogue and follow-up compound of LY-2795050, the first KOR-selective antagonist radiotracer. Relative to LY-2795050, LY-2459989 displays 4-fold higher affinity for the KOR and similar selectivity.

Earlier analogues of LY-2459989 besides LY-2795050 with similar actions and potential uses have also been described. Short-acting κ antagonists of this type have been shown to produce antidepressant-like effects in animal studies.

== See also ==
- κ-Opioid receptor § Antagonists
- List of investigational antidepressants
