= Navacaprant =

Investigational antidepressant compound

Clinical data
- Other names: BTRX-140; CYM-53093; NMRA-140; NMRA-335140
- Routes of administration: Oral
- Drug class: κ-Opioid receptor antagonist

Identifiers
- IUPAC name: 1-[6-ethyl-8-fluoro-4-methyl-3-(3-methyl-1,2,4-oxadiazol-5-yl)quinolin-2-yl]-N-(oxan-4-yl)piperidin-4-amine
- CAS Number: 2244614-14-8
- PubChem CID: 137434175
- ChemSpider: 78316413
- UNII: XK5ILZ28KI
- KEGG: D12869
- CompTox Dashboard (EPA): DTXSID401104655
- ECHA InfoCard: 100.513.362

Chemical and physical data
- Formula: C_{25}H_{32}FN_{5}O_{2}
- Molar mass: 453.562 g·mol^{−1}
- 3D model (JSmol): Interactive image
- SMILES: CCC1=CC2=C(C(=C(N=C2C(=C1)F)N3CCC(CC3)NC4CCOCC4)C5=NC(=NO5)C)C
- InChI: InChI=1S/C25H32FN5O2/c1-4-17-13-20-15(2)22(25-27-16(3)30-33-25)24(29-23(20)21(26)14-17)31-9-5-18(6-10-31)28-19-7-11-32-12-8-19/h13-14,18-19,28H,4-12H2,1-3H3; Key:CQOJHAJWCDJEAT-UHFFFAOYSA-N

Navacaprant (developmental code names include BTRX-335140, BTRX-140, CYM-53093, NMRA-335140, and NMRA-140) is a selective κ-opioid receptor (KOR) antagonist which is under development for the treatment of major depressive disorder and bipolar depression. It was originated by BlackThorn Therapeutics and is being developed by Neumora Therapeutics. As of February 2025, navacaprant is in phase 3 clinical trials for major depressive disorder. In January 2025, it was disclosed that navacaprant had failed to show effectiveness for major depressive disorder in a phase 3 trial. Upon this announcement, the stock price of Neumora Therapeutics decreased by 80%.

== See also ==
- κ-Opioid receptor § Antagonists
- List of investigational antidepressants
- List of investigational bipolar disorder drugs
- Aticaprant and icalcaprant
