= MEB-1170 =

Clinical data
- Other names: MEB1170
- Routes of administration: Oral
- Drug class: μ-Opioid receptor biased agonist; κ-Opioid receptor agonist; Analgesic; Opioid replacement
- ATC code: None

MEB-1170 is an atypical opioid receptor modulator which is under development for the treatment of pain and opioid use disorder. It is a highly biased agonist of the μ-opioid receptor (MOR) and appears to be biased for activation of G protein signaling over β-arrestin recruitment. Aside from the fact that it is a MOR biased agonist, the drug is said to be a MOR full agonist as well as a κ-opioid receptor (KOR) partial agonist and to have a unique pharmacological profile. It is taken orally.

The drug produces robust analgesia in several assays similarly to morphine in rodents. However, in contrast to other MOR agonists like morphine and oliceridine, MEB-1170 is said to have not produced analgesic tolerance, sedation, respiratory depression, rewarding effects, or reinforcing effects and to have shown only minimal withdrawal symptoms. In addition, unlike morphine, but similarly to oliceridine, it negligibly affected gastrointestinal transit, a measure of constipation-like effect. As such, the drug is claimed to have greatly improved tolerability, safety, and misuse liability relative to conventional opioids like morphine. The toxicokinetics of MEB-1170 in rats and dogs have been described. It has a longer duration than morphine in rodents.

MEB-1170 was first described in the news media in 2017 and in the scientific literature in 2018. It is being developed by Mebias Discovery. As of April 2023, the drug is in phase 1 clinical trials for treatment of pain and opioid use disorder. It is being developed for both prevention and treatment of opioid use disorder. A phase 1 dose-ascending trial has been completed as of October 2024. Mebias Discovery has received ongoing grant funding from the National Institute on Drug Abuse (NIDA) for the development of MEB-1170. The chemical structure of MEB-1170 does not yet appear to have been disclosed.

== See also ==
- μ-Opioid receptor § Biased agonists
