= BU09059 =

Chemical compound

Identifiers
- IUPAC name: ethyl 2-{[(3R)-7-hydroxy-1,2,3,4-tetrahydroisoquinolin-3-yl]formamido}-3-[(3R,4R)-4-(3-hydroxyphenyl)-3,4-dimethylpiperidin-1-yl]propanoate
- CAS Number: 1541206-05-6
- PubChem CID: 134817175
- ChemSpider: 88297259

Chemical and physical data
- Formula: C_{28}H_{37}N_{3}O_{5}
- Molar mass: 495.620 g·mol^{−1}
- 3D model (JSmol): Interactive image
- SMILES: CCOC(=O)C(CN1CC[C@](C)([C@@H](C)C1)c2cccc(O)c2)NC(=O)[C@H]3Cc4ccc(O)cc4CN3
- InChI: InChI=1S/C28H37N3O5/c1-4-36-27(35)25(30-26(34)24-13-19-8-9-23(33)12-20(19)15-29-24)17-31-11-10-28(3,18(2)16-31)21-6-5-7-22(32)14-21/h5-9,12,14,18,24-25,29,32-33H,4,10-11,13,15-17H2,1-3H3,(H,30,34)/t18-,24+,25?,28+/m0/s1; Key:RKGRJMYCISUSNK-XTNINKNLSA-N

BU09059 is a potent, selective, short-acting (non-"inactivating") antagonist of the κ-opioid receptor (KOR). It was derived from the irreversible (long-acting) KOR antagonist JDTic in search of an antagonist with a reversible profile of inactivation of the KOR that could be used with less concern to treat psychiatric disorders. In addition to its reversibility, BU09059 is much more selective for the KOR than JDTic, showing 15-fold and 616-fold preference for the KOR over the μ- and δ-opioid receptors (K_{i} = 1.72 nM, 26.5 nM, and 1060 nM, respectively).

== See also ==
- κ-Opioid receptor § Antagonists
- List of investigational antidepressants
