= PF-04455242 =

Abandoned drug for bipolar depression

Clinical data
- Other names: PF-4455242; PF04455242; PF4455242
- Routes of administration: Oral
- Drug class: κ-Opioid receptor antagonist
- ATC code: None

Identifiers
- IUPAC name: 2-methyl-N-[[4-(2-pyrrolidin-1-ylsulfonylphenyl)phenyl]methyl]propan-1-amine
- CAS Number: 1202647-54-8
- PubChem CID: 44599828
- ChemSpider: 26610764
- UNII: Y3530Z78QD
- ChEMBL: ChEMBL1818341
- CompTox Dashboard (EPA): DTXSID30152783

Chemical and physical data
- Formula: C_{21}H_{28}N_{2}O_{2}S
- Molar mass: 372.53 g·mol^{−1}
- 3D model (JSmol): Interactive image
- SMILES: CC(C)CNCC1=CC=C(C=C1)C2=CC=CC=C2S(=O)(=O)N3CCCC3
- InChI: InChI=1S/C21H28N2O2S/c1-17(2)15-22-16-18-9-11-19(12-10-18)20-7-3-4-8-21(20)26(24,25)23-13-5-6-14-23/h3-4,7-12,17,22H,5-6,13-16H2,1-2H3; Key:OWVIKBRKPCTDEP-UHFFFAOYSA-N

PF-04455242 is an experimental κ-opioid receptor (KOR) antagonist which was under development by Pfizer for the treatment of bipolar depression but was never marketed. Its development was discontinued in early clinical trials. It is taken by mouth.

== Pharmacology ==
The drug is a selective KOR antagonist and shows approximately 10- to 20-fold higher affinity for the KOR (K_{i} = 1–3 nM) over the μ-opioid receptor (MOR) (K_{i} = 10–64 nM) and has negligible affinity for the δ-opioid receptor (DOR) (K_{i} > 4,000 nM). It is a "short-acting" or non-inactivating antagonist of the KOR (as opposed to irreversible antagonists like JDTic). Although originally characterized as a KOR neutral antagonist however, subsequent research revealed in 2020 that PF-04455242 is actually only a moderately efficacious partial antagonist of the KOR (I_{max} ≈ 50%). In any case, the drug reversed the analgesic and prolactin-elevating effects of the KOR agonist spiradoline in animals, showed efficacy in animal models predictive of antidepressant activity, and reversed stress-induced reinstatement of cocaine-seeking behavior. However, PF-04455242 also showed a variety of other weak off-target activities.

== Clinical studies ==
PF-04455242 reached phase 1 clinical trials for bipolar depression prior to the discontinuation of its development in 2010. Its development was discontinued upon unfavorable toxicological findings in animals that had been exposed to the drug for 3 months. Along with JDTic, which was also discontinued due to toxicity findings early in clinical trials, PF-04455242 was one of the first KOR antagonists to be developed for potential treatment of psychiatric disorders. It was in phase 1 trials by 2009 and was first described in the scientific literature by 2010.

== See also ==
- κ-Opioid receptor § Antagonists
- List of investigational antidepressants
- List of investigational bipolar disorder drugs
