= Niravoline =

Names
- Preferred IUPAC name N-Methyl-2-(3-nitrophenyl)-N-[(1S,2S)-2-(pyrrolidin-1-yl)-2,3-dihydro-1H-inden-1-yl]acetamide

Identifiers
CAS Number	130610-93-4
3D model (JSmol)	Interactive image
ChEMBL	ChEMBL2105162
ChemSpider	7996923
PubChem CID	9821174
UNII	R8T17Q4LXC
CompTox Dashboard (EPA)	DTXSID601123055
- InChI: InChI=1S/C22H25N3O3/c1-23(21(26)14-16-7-6-9-18(13-16)25(27)28)22-19-10-3-2-8-17(19)15-20(22)24-11-4-5-12-24/h2-3,6-10,13,20,22H,4-5,11-12,14-15H2,1H3/t20-,22-/m0/s1 Key: ZSDAQBWGAOKTSI-UNMCSNQZSA-N
- SMILES: CN([C@@H]1[C@H](CC2=CC=CC=C12)N3CCCC3)C(=O)CC4=CC(=CC=C4)[N+](=O)[O-]

Properties
Chemical formula	C_{22}H_{25}N_{3}O_{3}
Molar mass	379.460 g·mol^{−1}
- Except where otherwise noted, data are given for materials in their standard state (at 25 °C [77 °F], 100 kPa). Infobox references

Niravoline, also known as RU-51599, is a chemical compound with the formula C_{22}H_{25}N_{3}O_{3}. It has diuretic and aquaretic effects and has been studied for its potential use for cerebral edema and cirrhosis.

It exerts its pharmacological effect as a κ-opioid receptor agonist. The drug produces hallucinogenic effects at high doses in humans.
