= Icalcaprant =

Chemical compound

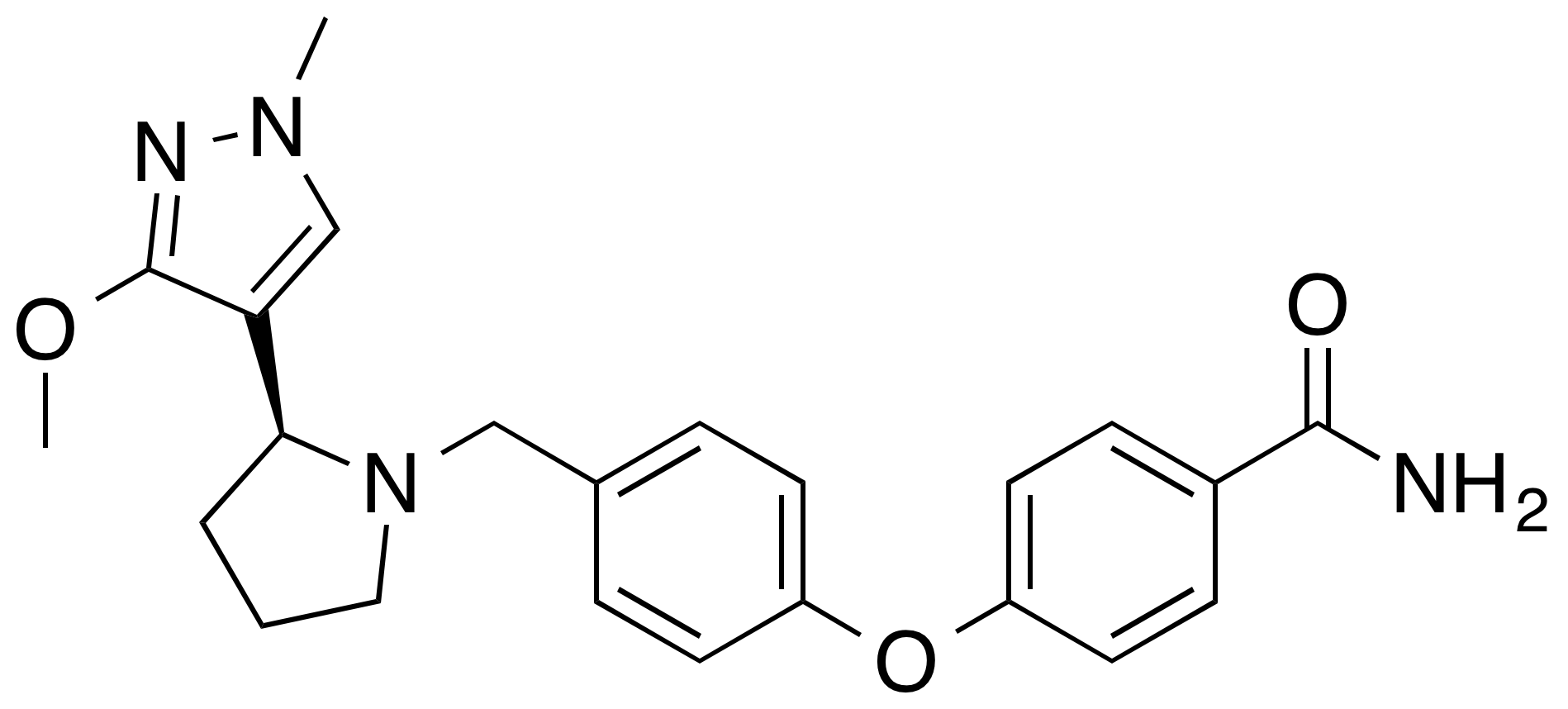

Clinical data
- Other names: CVL-354
- Routes of administration: Oral
- Drug class: κ-Opioid receptor antagonist

Identifiers
- IUPAC name: 4-[4-{{(2S)-2-(3-methoxy-1-methylpyrazol-4-yl)pyrrolidin-1-yl]methyl]phenoxy]benzamide
- CAS Number: 2227384-17-8
- PubChem CID: 134540598
- UNII: GNR4JZG668
- KEGG: D13002
- ChEMBL: ChEMBL5314519

Chemical and physical data
- Formula: C_{23}H_{26}N_{4}O_{3}
- Molar mass: 406.486 g·mol^{−1}
- 3D model (JSmol): Interactive image
- SMILES: CN1C=C(C(=N1)OC)[C@@H]2CCCN2CC3=CC=C(C=C3)OC4=CC=C(C=C4)C(=O)N
- InChI: InChI=1S/C23H26N4O3/c1-26-15-20(23(25-26)29-2)21-4-3-13-27(21)14-16-5-9-18(10-6-16)30-19-11-7-17(8-12-19)22(24)28/h5-12,15,21H,3-4,13-14H2,1-2H3,(H2,24,28)/t21-/m0/s1; Key:OBDLEFCGVHQDFR-NRFANRHFSA-N

Icalcaprant (developmental code name CVL-354) is a κ-opioid receptor (KOR) antagonist which is under development for the treatment of major depressive disorder and substance-related disorders. It is taken by mouth.

It acts as a selective antagonist of the KOR. The drug is also more weakly an antagonist of the μ-opioid receptor (MOR), with about 31-fold lower affinity and 27-fold lower inhibitory potency at the MOR relative to the KOR.

It was originated by Pfizer and is under development by Cerevel Therapeutics (a subsidiary of AbbVie). As of September 2022, icalcaprant is in phase 1 clinical trials for major depressive disorder and is in the preclincal stage of development for substance-related disorders.

== See also ==
- κ-Opioid receptor § Antagonists
- List of investigational antidepressants
- List of investigational bipolar disorder drugs
- List of investigational substance-related disorder drugs
- Aticaprant and navacaprant
