= ICI-204,448 =

Chemical compound

Identifiers
- IUPAC name: 2-(3-[1-([2-(3,4-dichlorophenyl)acetyl]-methylamino)-2-pyrrolidin-1-ylethyl]phenoxy)acetic acid
- CAS Number: 121264-04-8
- PubChem CID: 3683
- IUPHAR/BPS: 1650
- ChemSpider: 3555
- ChEBI: CHEBI:91666
- ChEMBL: ChEMBL23472
- CompTox Dashboard (EPA): DTXSID20923747

Chemical and physical data
- Formula: C_{23}H_{26}Cl_{2}N_{2}O_{4}
- Molar mass: 465.37 g·mol^{−1}
- 3D model (JSmol): Interactive image
- SMILES: C2CCCN2CC(c(ccc3)cc3OCC(O)=O)N(C)C(=O)Cc(cc1Cl)ccc1Cl
- InChI: InChI=1S/C23H26Cl2N2O4/c1-26(22(28)12-16-7-8-19(24)20(25)11-16)21(14-27-9-2-3-10-27)17-5-4-6-18(13-17)31-15-23(29)30/h4-8,11,13,21H,2-3,9-10,12,14-15H2,1H3,(H,29,30); Key:JKYJSFISYHSNOE-UHFFFAOYSA-N

ICI-204,448 is a drug which acts as a potent and peripherally selective κ-opioid agonist, with possible uses in the treatment of heart attack as well as anti-itching effects. It is used in research to distinguish centrally from peripherally mediated kappa opioid receptor effects.
