= Apadoline =

Clinical data
- Other names: RP-60180; RP60180; RP-60,180; RP-60180A
- Drug class: κ-Opioid receptor agonist
- ATC code: None

Identifiers
- IUPAC name: N-propyl-10-[(2R)-1-pyrrolidin-1-ylpropan-2-yl]phenothiazine-2-carboxamide
- CAS Number: 135003-30-4
- PubChem CID: 179334
- DrugBank: DB20043
- ChemSpider: 156101
- UNII: 5Q36UVB8YA
- ChEMBL: ChEMBL442174
- CompTox Dashboard (EPA): DTXSID101350883

Chemical and physical data
- Formula: C_{23}H_{29}N_{3}OS
- Molar mass: 395.57 g·mol^{−1}
- 3D model (JSmol): Interactive image
- SMILES: CCCNC(=O)C1=CC2=C(C=C1)SC3=CC=CC=C3N2[C@H](C)CN4CCCC4
- InChI: InChI=1S/C23H29N3OS/c1-3-12-24-23(27)18-10-11-22-20(15-18)26(17(2)16-25-13-6-7-14-25)19-8-4-5-9-21(19)28-22/h4-5,8-11,15,17H,3,6-7,12-14,16H2,1-2H3,(H,24,27)/t17-/m1/s1; Key:KXMAIWXPZGQNCR-QGZVFWFLSA-N

Apadoline (INN; developmental code name RP-60180) is a κ-opioid receptor agonist and experimental analgesic which was under development for the treatment of cancer pain but was never marketed. It produces effects and adverse effects in humans including analgesia, drowsiness, and headache, among others. Its affinities (K_{i}) for the opioid receptors are 0.55 nM for the κ-opioid receptor, 11.4 nM for the δ-opioid receptor, and 57 nM for the μ-opioid receptor. Apadoline was first described in the scientific literature by 1990. It was under development by Rhône-Poulenc in the 1990s and reached phase 2 clinical trials prior to the discontinuation of its development. An analogue with greater potency, RP-61127, has also been described.

== See also ==
- List of investigational analgesics
- κ-Opioid receptor agonist
