= ICI-199,441 =

Chemical compound

Identifiers
- IUPAC name: 2-(3,4-dichlorophenyl)-N-methyl-N-[(1S)-1-phenyl-2-pyrrolidin-1-ylethyl]acetamide
- CAS Number: 116508-24-8
- PubChem CID: 3082718
- IUPHAR/BPS: 11691
- ChemSpider: 2340095
- UNII: Q5R50X7L6M
- ChEMBL: ChEMBL38576
- CompTox Dashboard (EPA): DTXSID101029523 DTXSID60921646, DTXSID101029523

Chemical and physical data
- Formula: C_{21}H_{24}Cl_{2}N_{2}O
- Molar mass: 391.34 g·mol^{−1}
- 3D model (JSmol): Interactive image
- SMILES: CN([C@H](CN1CCCC1)c2ccccc2)C(=O)Cc3ccc(c(c3)Cl)Cl
- InChI: InChI=1S/C21H24Cl2N2O/c1-24(21(26)14-16-9-10-18(22)19(23)13-16)20(15-25-11-5-6-12-25)17-7-3-2-4-8-17/h2-4,7-10,13,20H,5-6,11-12,14-15H2,1H3/t20-/m1/s1; Key:AEJOEPSMZCEYJN-HXUWFJFHSA-N

ICI-199,441 is a drug which acts as a potent and selective κ-opioid agonist, and has analgesic effects. It is a biased agonist of the KOR, and is one of relatively few KOR ligands that is G protein-biased rather than β-arrestin-biased.

== See also ==
- U-47700
- U-50488
- U-69,593
