= JDTic =

Chemical compound

Clinical data
- Other names: JDTic

Identifiers
- IUPAC name: (3R)-7-Hydroxy-N-[(2S)-1-[(3R,4R)-4-(3-hydroxyphenyl)-3,4-dimethylpiperidin-1-yl]-3-methylbutan-2-yl]-1,2,3,4-tetrahydroisoquinoline-3-carboxamide
- CAS Number: 361444-66-8
- PubChem CID: 9956146
- IUPHAR/BPS: 7362
- ChemSpider: 8131755
- UNII: 3C6FZ6UXC8
- PDB ligand: JDC (PDBe, RCSB PDB)
- CompTox Dashboard (EPA): DTXSID70433301

Chemical and physical data
- Formula: C_{28}H_{39}N_{3}O_{3}
- Molar mass: 465.638 g·mol^{−1}
- 3D model (JSmol): Interactive image
- SMILES: C[C@H]1CN(CC[C@@]1(C)C2=CC(=CC=C2)O)C[C@H](C(C)C)NC(=O)[C@H]3CC4=C(CN3)C=C(C=C4)O
- InChI: InChI=1S/C28H39N3O3/c1-18(2)26(30-27(34)25-13-20-8-9-24(33)12-21(20)15-29-25)17-31-11-10-28(4,19(3)16-31)22-6-5-7-23(32)14-22/h5-9,12,14,18-19,25-26,29,32-33H,10-11,13,15-17H2,1-4H3,(H,30,34)/t19-,25+,26+,28+/m0/s1; Key:ZLVXBBHTMQJRSX-VMGNSXQWSA-N

JDTic is a selective, long-acting ("inactivating") antagonist of the κ-opioid receptor (KOR). JDTic is a 4-phenylpiperidine derivative, distantly related structurally to analgesics such as pethidine and ketobemidone, and more closely to the MOR antagonist alvimopan. In addition, it is structurally distinct from other KOR antagonists such as norbinaltorphimine. JDTic has been used to create crystal structures of KOR [ PDB: 4DJH, 6VI4].

== Pharmacology ==
JDTic is a potent KOR antagonist, and is highly selective for KOR over μ- (MOR) and δ-opioid receptors (DOR), along with many non-opioid receptors. However, it shows modest affinity for the nociceptin receptor (NOP). In one study, JDTic showed little binding selectivity over the μ-opioid receptor, but it failed to block the effects of the selective μ-opioid receptor agonist sufentanil across a wide range of doses in animals. It has a very long duration of action, with effects in animals seen for up to several weeks after administration of a single dose, although its binding to the KOR is not irreversible; its long duration of action is instead caused by activation of a c-Jun N-terminal kinase.

Animal studies suggest that JDTic may produce antidepressant, anxiolytic, and anti-stress effects, as well as having possible application in the treatment of addiction to cocaine and morphine. JDTic shows robust activity in animal models of depression, anxiety, stress-induced cocaine relapse, and nicotine withdrawal.

== Discontinuation of clinical development ==
During phase I human clinical trials for the treatment of cocaine abuse, development of JDTic was halted due to the occurrence of non-sustained ventricular tachycardia, a type of arrhythmia that can potentially be life-threatening. As a result, new KOR antagonists with more favorable drug profiles (e.g., short-acting, improved brain penetration, etc.), such as ALKS-5461 (a combination of buprenorphine and samidorphan) and CERC-501 (formerly LY-2456302), are being developed instead.

The discontinuation of the clinical development of JDTic is detailed in the following important literature quote:

Overall, the adverse events attributed to JDtic were similar to those reported with placebo, except for cardiac events, such as bradycardia and ventricular tachycardia (VT), which were seen only in the JDTic group. The episodes of VT occurred in two subjects, were not sustained (NSVT), and were asymptomatic. Preclinical experiments in monkeys showed that JDTic administration resulted in a short run of NSVT. Other safety measurements, including clinical laboratory studies, 12-lead ECG, psychomotor function, and measures of mood, did not differ between group during admission or at follow-up. Overall, these results indicate that JDTic administration is associated with short lived, but detectable ventricular tachycardia in 2/6 subjects receiving the active dose. The episodes of NSVT were asymptomatic, were not seen in the majority of subjects, and sporadic. NSVT is known to occur in the general population, although at a low rate. Nonetheless, the likelihood that these cardiac events were induced by JDTic is high, given that both events occurred as a similar time following dosing, the lower incidence of sporadic VT expected in healthy subjects, and the presence of kappa receptors and dynorphin in cardiac tissue. Given the potentially serious clinical consequences of VT and concerns that individuals with cardiovascular disease may have heightened vulnerability, the decision was made by the safety board of this study that further human trials of this drug would not be ethically justified.

In the same paper, LY-2456302 (now CERC-501) was described, "The LY2456302 compound developed by Eli Lilly is an example of a KOR antagonist that does not strongly activate JNK. In a recent phase 1 trial of LY2456302, the authors concluded that the drug was well-tolerated with no clinically significant findings (Lowe et al, 2014)." Note that KOR antagonists that strongly activate JNK are inactivating (long-acting) while those that do not are non-inactivating (short-acting), and that inactivating KOR antagonists are more "complete" and hence potentially more risky inhibitors of the KOR than are non-inactivating antagonists.

== See also ==
- κ-Opioid receptor § Antagonists
- List of investigational antidepressants
