= GR-103545 =

Kappa opioid receptor radioligand

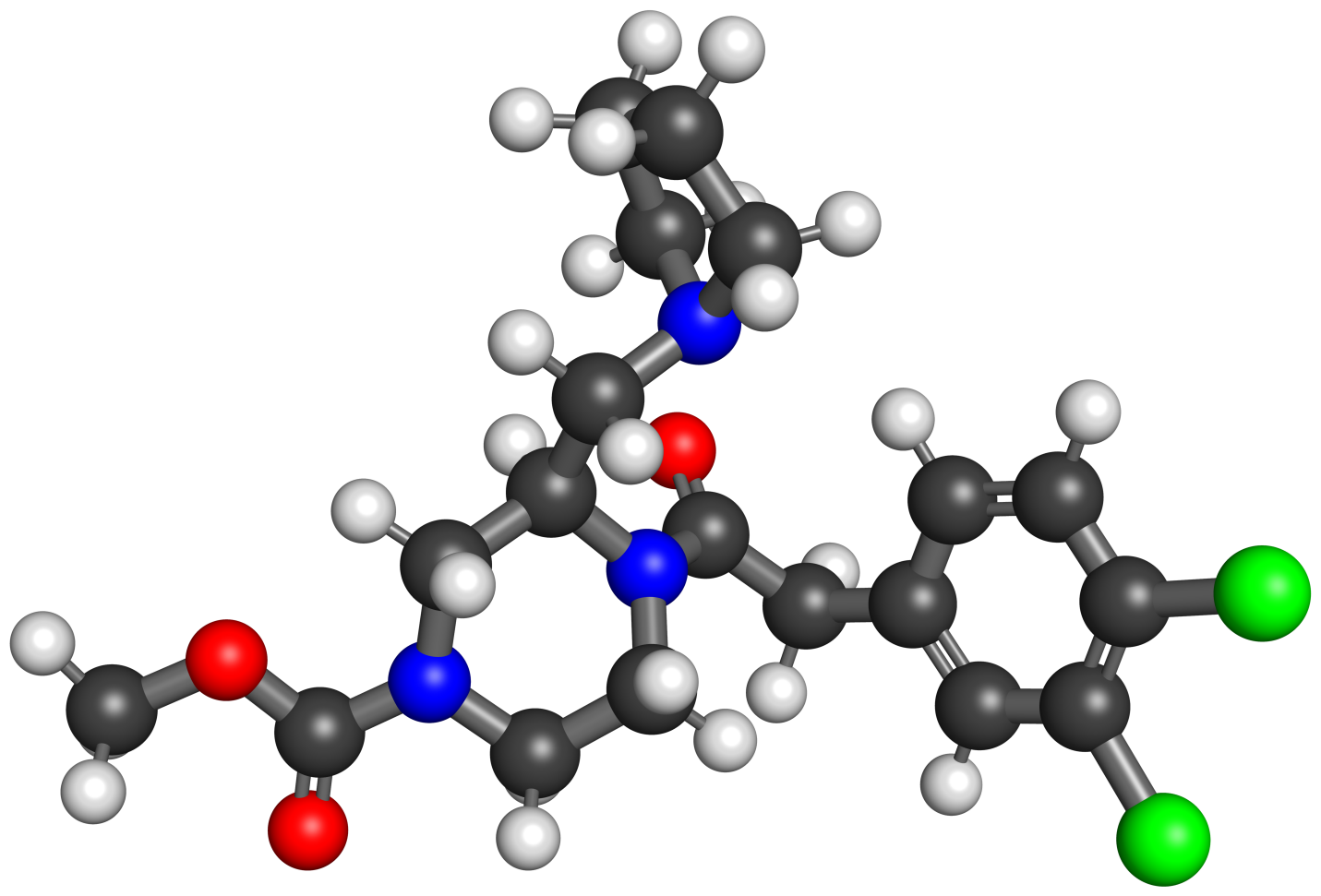

Names
- IUPAC name methyl (3R)-4-[2-(3,4-dichlorophenyl)acetyl]-3-(pyrrolidin-1-ylmethyl)piperazine-1-carboxylate
- Other names GR-103545; 860VEX6583; GR103545

Identifiers
CAS Number	126766-42-5
3D model (JSmol)	Interactive image
ChEMBL	ChEMBL277863
ChemSpider	5036164
PubChem CID	6603856
UNII	860VEX6583
- InChI: InChI=1S/C19H25Cl2N3O3/c1-27-19(26)23-8-9-24(15(13-23)12-22-6-2-3-7-22)18(25)11-14-4-5-16(20)17(21)10-14/h4-5,10,15H,2-3,6-9,11-13H2,1H3/t15-/m1/s1 Key: HJUAKZYKCANOOZ-OAHLLOKOSA-N
- SMILES: OC(/C=C/C(O)=O)=O.ClC(C=C1CC(N2[C@@H](CN(CC2)C(OC)=O)CN3CCCC3)=O)=C(C=C1)Cl

Properties
Chemical formula	C_{19}H_{25}Cl_{2}N_{3}O_{3}
Molar mass	414.3 g/mol
- Except where otherwise noted, data are given for materials in their standard state (at 25 °C [77 °F], 100 kPa). Infobox references

GR-103545 is a potent and highly selective κ-opioid receptor (KOR) agonist primarily employed as a radioligand in positron emission tomography (PET) neuroimaging research. When radiolabeled with carbon-11, [^{11}C]GR-103545 serves as a neuroimaging tracer for quantifying KOR availability and receptor occupancy in the human brain.

== Pharmacology ==
=== Mechanism of action ===
GR-103545 acts as an agonist of the κ-opioid receptor (KOR), exhibiting high selectivity over other opioid receptor subtypes. The compound represents the active (−)-enantiomer of the racemic mixture GR-89696.

=== Binding affinity and selectivity ===
Based on In vitro radioligand competition assays using recombinant cells expressing human opioid receptors GR-103545 binds to KOR with high affinity (K_{i} = 0.02 ± 0.01 nmol/L) and exhibits substantial selectivity over μ-opioid receptors (K_{i} = 16 ± 5 nmol/L) and δ-opioid receptors (K_{i} = 536 ± 234 nmol/L). It is approximately 800-fold selective for KOR over μ-opioid and even more selective over δ-opioid receptors. The in vivo dissociation constant (K_{D}) of [^{11}C]GR-103545 has been estimated at 0.069 nmol/L in humans and 0.048 nmol/L in rhesus macaques.

=== Regional distribution ===
The highest binding potential values based on [^{11}C] radioligand are observed in the amygdala, anterior cingulate cortex, and insula. Intermediate binding is detected in the temporal lobe, frontal lobe, globus pallidus, and putamen, while lower binding is observed in the occipital lobe, caudate nucleus, hippocampus, posterior cingulate cortex, cerebellum, and thalamus. In titi monkeys the highest binding was observed in the pituitary gland, followed by the insula, claustrum, and orbitofrontal cortex.

== Neuroimaging applications ==
=== PET imaging characteristics ===
[^{11}C]GR-103545 demonstrates favorable properties for PET imaging, including high brain penetration, and good specific binding signals in non-human primates and humans, although it has slow kinetics and variability of kinetic parameters is higher than desirable. Following intravenous administration, the radiotracer exhibits relatively slow kinetics in human brain tissue, with uptake reaching plateau at approximately 100 minutes post-injection in high-binding regions. The non-displaceable distribution volume (V_{ND}) has been estimated at 3.4 ± 0.9 mL/cm^{3} using naltrexone blocking studies. Test-retest reproducibility studies have shown relative variability of approximately 15% for regional volume of distribution measurements.

=== Substance use disorders ===
Imaging with [^{11}C]GR-103545 has been employed to investigate κ-opioid receptor (KOR) involvement in cocaine use disorder. One study have demonstrated an association between KOR availability and cocaine self-administration behavior, with greater KOR binding associated with increased cocaine-seeking. Additionally, cocaine binge administration has been shown to reduce the radioligand's binding by 18% in the striatum and 14% across other brain regions.

== See also ==
- Kappa opioid receptor
- Positron emission tomography
- Radioligand
