= Synthetic substance =

A synthetic substance or synthetic compound refers to a substance that is made by changing starting substances, such as naturally occurring substances, into new substances with different characteristics. All synthetic substances are created via a chemical reaction, for example by chemical synthesis.

== Definition ==
Standard middle school chemistry curriculums define a substance to be synthetic when it is created via a chemical process. Previously, the NOSB considered any substance not occurring in a plant, animal or mineral to be synthetic. In 2005, the USDA redefined the definition of synthetic. Non-synthetic substances are considered to be such when they are extracted from a naturally occurring plant, animal, or mineral without any chemical reaction occurring, provided any synthetic substances used in the extraction remain at insignificant levels. They also clarified that products that are created via chemical reactions within living organisms, such as reaction via enzymes, to not be synthetic, i.e. biosynthetic products do not count as being a synthetic substance.

Once a substance is extracted and processed, had it not already been, it would be petitioned to be included to the National List of Allowed and Prohibited Substances, a list of substances that may and may not be used in organic crop and livestock production. In general, non-synthetic substances are allowed while synthetic products are not, with certain exceptions.

== Examples ==
There are countless examples of synthetic substances, many are found in our daily lives. Some notable examples include:

- Plastics
- Drugs
- Cloths
- Fuel
- Rubber
