= Eluxadoline =

Chemical compound

- Skeletal structure of eluxadoline

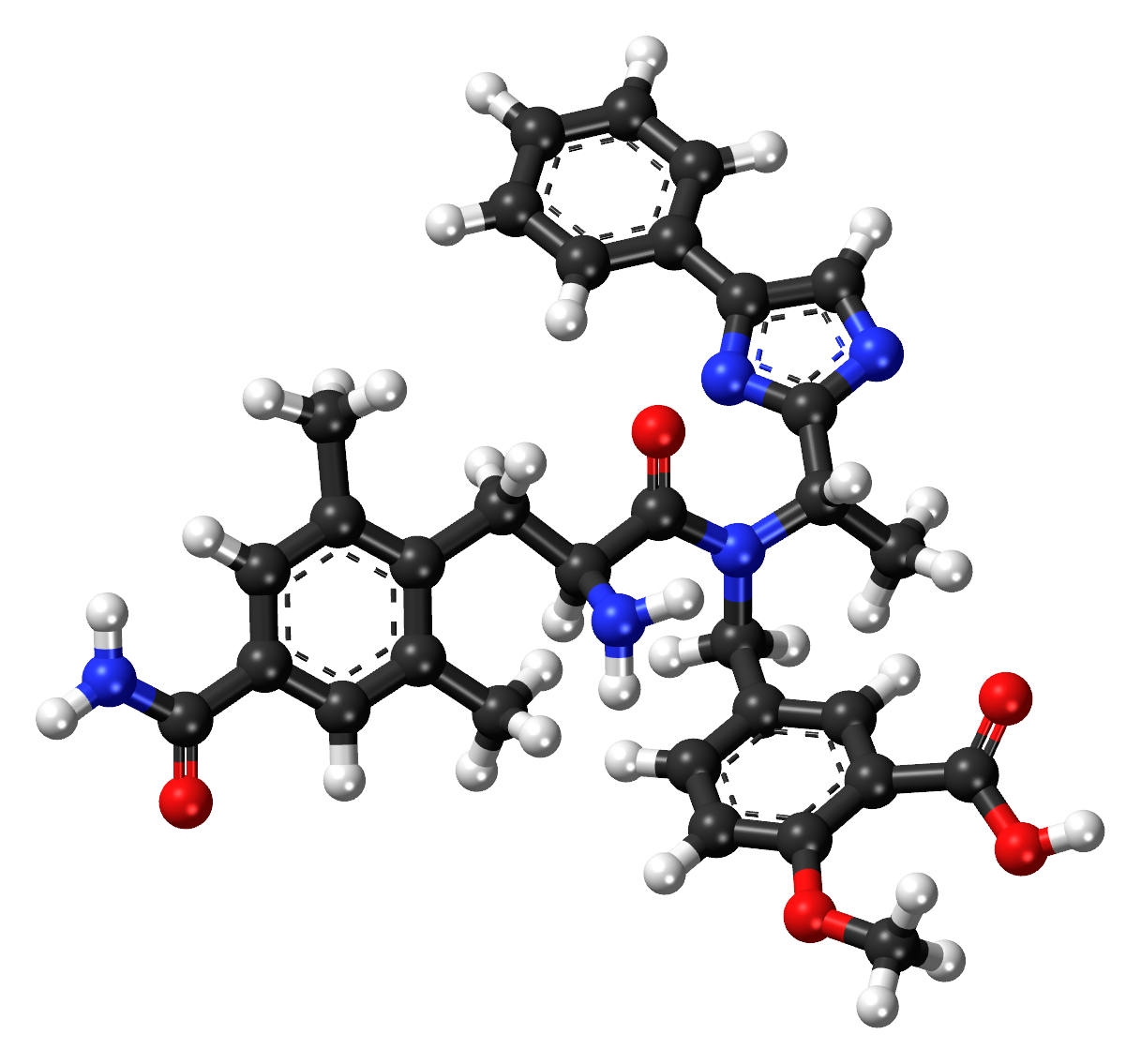
- Ball-and-stick model of eluxadoline

Clinical data
- Pronunciation: Viberzi (/vaɪˈbɜːrzi/ vy-BUR-zee
- Trade names: Viberzi, Truberzi
- Other names: JNJ-27018966
- Addiction liability: None
- Routes of administration: Oral (by mouth)
- ATC code: A07DA06 (WHO)

Legal status
- Legal status: CA: ℞-only; US: Schedule IV

Pharmacokinetic data
- Bioavailability: 1.0 % (low due to poor gastrointestinal permeability and significant first-pass metabolism)
- Protein binding: 81%
- Elimination half-life: 3.7–6 hours
- Excretion: 82.2% (feces), <1% (urine)

Identifiers
- IUPAC name: 5-({[(2S)-2-amino-3-(4-carbamoyl-2,6-dimethylphenyl)propanoyl][(1S)-1-(4-phenyl-1H-imidazol-2-yl)ethyl]amino}methyl)-2-methoxybenzoic acid
- CAS Number: 864821-90-9
- PubChem CID: 11250029
- IUPHAR/BPS: 7691
- DrugBank: DB09272
- ChemSpider: 9425062
- UNII: 45TPJ4MBQ1
- KEGG: D10403
- CompTox Dashboard (EPA): DTXSID70235589

Chemical and physical data
- Formula: C_{32}H_{35}N_{5}O_{5}
- Molar mass: 569.662 g·mol^{−1}
- 3D model (JSmol): Interactive image
- SMILES: COc1ccc(CN(C(=O)C(N)Cc2c(C)cc(C(N)=O)cc2C)C(C)c2ncc(-c3ccccc3)[nH]2)cc1C(=O)O
- InChI: InChI=1S/C32H35N5O5/c1-18-12-23(29(34)38)13-19(2)24(18)15-26(33)31(39)37(17-21-10-11-28(42-4)25(14-21)32(40)41)20(3)30-35-16-27(36-30)22-8-6-5-7-9-22/h5-14,16,20,26H,15,17,33H2,1-4H3,(H2,34,38)(H,35,36)(H,40,41)/t20-,26-/m0/s1; Key:QFNHIDANIVGXPE-FNZWTVRRSA-N

Eluxadoline, sold under the brand names Viberzi and Truberzi, is a medication taken by mouth for the treatment of diarrhea and abdominal pain in individuals with diarrhea-predominant irritable bowel syndrome (IBS-D). It was approved for use in the United States in 2015. The drug originated from Janssen Pharmaceutica and was developed by Actavis.

== Contraindications ==
This drug is contraindicated in case of having:

- Blockage of the gallbladder or a sphincter of Oddi problem
- Problems with excessive alcohol use
- Pancreatitis
- Liver problems
- Chronic or severe constipation

== Adverse effects ==
Common adverse effects are constipation and nausea, but rates of discontinuation due to constipation were low for both eluxadoline and placebo. Rare adverse effects: fatigue, bronchitis, viral gastroenteritis. Rare serious adverse effects include pancreatitis with a general incidence of 0.3%: higher incidence with 100 mg dose (0.3%) than with 75 mg dose (0.2%). The risk is even greater in those who do not have a gallbladder and the medication is not recommended in this group.

In March 2017, the U.S. Food and Drug Administration issued a safety alert for eluxadoline concerning an increased risk of serious pancreatitis in patients without a gallbladder. An FDA review found that in such patients, spasm of the sphincter of Oddi may lead to severe pancreatitis. The FDA reported that in some cases symptoms have occurred with just one or two doses at the recommended dosage for patients without a gallbladder (75 mg). Of two deaths associated with eluxadoline reported up to February 2017, both occurred in patients without a gallbladder.

== Interactions ==
Elevated concentrations of eluxadoline were observed with co-administration of inhibitors of the transporter protein OATP1B1, such as ciclosporin, gemfibrozil, certain antiretrovirals, rifampicin, and eltrombopag.

Concurrent use of other drugs that cause constipation, such as opioids, alosetron, anticholinergics, and bismuth subsalicylate, is not preferred.

Eluxadoline increases the concentrations of drugs which are OATP1B1 and BCRP substrates. Co-administration of eluxadoline with rosuvastatin may increase the risk of rhabdomyolysis.

== Pharmacology ==
=== Mechanism of action ===
Eluxadoline is a μ- and κ-opioid receptor agonist and δ-opioid receptor antagonist that acts locally in the enteric nervous system, possibly decreasing adverse effects on the central nervous system.

=== Pharmacokinetics ===
In the in vitro studies, eluxadoline was found to be transported by OAT3 (SLC22A8), OATP1B1 (SLCO1B1), and BSEP (ABCB11) at the highest concentrations tested (400 ng/ml, which is 162-fold larger than the observed C_{max} of the highest therapeutic dose of 100 mg). However, it was not to be transported by OCT1 POU2F1, OAT1 (organic anion transporter 1), OCT2, OATP1B3 (SLCO1B3), P-gp (P-glycoprotein), or BCRP (ABCG2).

Multidrug resistance-associated protein 2 (MRP2)-vesicular accumulation of eluxadoline was observed, indicating that the drug is a substrate of MRP2. Eluxadoline was not found to inhibit BCRP-, BSEP-, MRP2-, OCT1-, OCT2-, OAT1-, OAT3-, or OATP1B3-mediated transport of probe substrates but inhibited the transport of probe substrates of OATP1B1 and P-gp. In the in vitro studies, it was observed that eluxadoline is an in vivo substrate of OATP1B1, OAT3, and MRP2. Finally, no inhibition or induction of cytochrome P450 enzymes was observed.

Following a 100 mg dose of eluxadoline, the C_{max} was about 2 to 4 ng/ml and AUC was 12 to 22 ng.h/ml. Eluxadoline has linear pharmacokinetics with no accumulation upon repeated twice daily dosing. Taking eluxadoline with high fat meal decreased the C_{max} by 50% and AUC by 60%.

== Chemistry ==
=== Synthesis ===
The synthesis of eluxadoline was published in 2006.

== Future ==
it is currently undergoing Phase 3 clinical trials for pediatric use ( ages 6-17)
