= BRL-52537 =

Chemical compound

Identifiers
- IUPAC name: 2-(3,4-dichlorophenyl)-1-[(2S)-2-(pyrrolidin-1-ylmethyl)piperidin-1-yl]ethanone
- CAS Number: 130497-33-5
- PubChem CID: 6603740
- ChemSpider: 5036053
- CompTox Dashboard (EPA): DTXSID501137900 DTXSID00462129, DTXSID501137900

Chemical and physical data
- Formula: C_{18}H_{24}Cl_{2}N_{2}O
- Molar mass: 355.30 g·mol^{−1}
- 3D model (JSmol): Interactive image
- SMILES: C1CCN([C@@H](C1)CN2CCCC2)C(=O)CC3=CC(=C(C=C3)Cl)Cl
- InChI: InChI=1S/C18H24Cl2N2O/c19-16-7-6-14(11-17(16)20)12-18(23)22-10-2-1-5-15(22)13-21-8-3-4-9-21/h6-7,11,15H,1-5,8-10,12-13H2/t15-/m0/s1; Key:GHCCBWMZKJQGLS-HNNXBMFYSA-N

BRL-52537 is a drug which acts as a potent and highly selective κ-opioid agonist. It has neuroprotective effects in animal studies, and is used for research into potential treatments for stroke and heart attack as well as more general brain research.
