= Paraventricular thalamus =

The paraventricular thalamus (PVT) is a midline thalamic nucleus with broad connectivity with other brain structures such as the hypothalamus, striatum, and amygdala. Rodent studies suggest that the PVT plays a role in modulating reward-seeking behavior, threat avoidance, and wakefulness via the hypothalamic-thalamic-striatal circuit, while contributing to the retrieval of fear and the regulation of stress through other circuits.

== Anatomy ==
The PVT is a nucleus in the midline nuclear group of the thalamus. It has an elongated ovoid shape and an approximate volume of 7 mm³. At the cellular level, the PVT is composed predominantly of glutamatergic neurons, neurons that release glutamate as the primary neurotransmitter.

== Connectivity ==
The PVT is connected to several structures, including the brainstem, midbrain, striatum, and medial temporal lobe.

For the brainstem and midbrain, the PVT receives inputs in the form of orexin from the hypothalamus, which are essential for regulating stress responses, anxiety, wakefulness, and motivated behaviors. For output, PVT sends glutamatergic projections, projections involving glutamate) to the bed nucleus of the stria terminalis (BNST), a region that plays a crucial role in regulating anxiety. The PVT also stimulates dopaminergic neurons in the ventral tegmental area (VTA), influencing reward-related dopamine release and motivation.

For the striatum, PVT's outputs, including glutamate and corticotropin-releasing hormone (CRH), trigger dopamine release in the nucleus accumbens (NAc), supporting reward and motivational processes. PVT also triggers the caudate via glutamatergic activity, influencing behavioral choices associated with action selection and goal-directed activities

For the medial temporal lobe, PVT sends glutamatergic and CRH outputs to the amygdala, a brain structure crucial for consolidating and expressing fear memories.

== Functions (suggested by studies in rodents) ==
=== PVT in the hypothalamic-thalamic-striatal circuit ===
The PVT is a critical node of the hypothalamic-thalamic-striatal circuit. This circuit is composed of three brain structures: the hypothalamus, the NAc, and the PVT. The PVT integrates the other two structures, facilitating reward-seeking behavior, threat avoidance and wakefulness.

==== Reward-seeking behavior ====
The PVT is critical in modulating reward-seeking behavior as part of the hypothalamic-thalamic-striatal circuit.

The circuit's activity begins when the LH detects internal states such as hunger, thirst, arousal, and stress, and sends the detected state as orexin signals to the PVT. The orexin signals increase activity in glutamatergic neurons in PVT, meaning the neurons fire more frequently and release glutamate. Glutamate is transmitted to the NAc, which triggers dopamine release, thereby increasing dopamine activity in the NAc. As a result, the increased dopamine activity of NAc neurons promotes reward-seeking behaviors.

==== Threat avoidance ====
The PVT is also critical in modulating threat-avoidant behavior, a reduce in reward-seeking behavior when a threat is detected through the hypothalamic-thalamic-striatal circuit.

In this pathway, the ventromedial hypothalamus (VMH) detects threats and sends glutamatergic projections to the PVT), specifically corticotropin-releasing factor (CRF) neurons, a type of neuron that expresses CRF. This triggers the CRF neurons to release glutamate into the nucleus accumbens (NAc), thereby altering the following activities of the NAc. Firstly, the released glutamate reduces the activity of medium spiny neurons (MSNs), decreasing reward-seeking behaviors. Secondly, the glutamate triggers the release of acetylcholine from cholinergic interneurons, which subsequently reduces the activity of MSNs and dopamine, both contributing to decreased reward-seeking behaviors.

==== Wakefulness ====
The PVT is critical to wakefulness through fiber photometry studies, which show high activity of PVT neurons during wakefulness. Moreover, the study indicates that suppression of PVT activity leads to reduced wakefulness.

Overall, this function is facilitated via the hypothalamic-thalamic-striatal circuit. The first connection of the circuit involves the projection of hypocretin from the lateral hypothalamus (LH) to the PVT, which activates the glutamergic neurons to fire and release glutamate in the PVT. This pathway was demonstrated by the finding that chemogenetic inhibition of these hypocretin inputs decreases wakefulness, whereas optogenetic stimulation showed the increased firing of PVT neurons, promoting wakefulness.

Glutamatergic neurons in the PVT transmit glutamate to dopamine D1 receptor-expressing neurons in the NAc, increasing dopamine activity in the NAc, and, as a result, promoting wakefulness. In the experiment, stimulating the PVT-NAc pathway triggers transitions from sleep to wakefulness, while inhibiting this pathway decreases wakefulness.

=== PVT in other circuits ===
==== Fear retrieval ====
Research on the retrieval of conditioned fear in rodents indicates that the PVT becomes engaged at a delayed time point following fear conditioning. For the methodology, rats were trained to associate a specific auditory cue with an electric shock, and neural responses were later assessed when the conditioned stimulus was reintroduced. As a result, PVT activity did not immediately increase, but became stronger 24 hours after conditioning, as evidenced by increased c-fos expression, a marker of neuronal activation, and greater neuronal responsiveness to the conditioned stimulus.

A temporal shift in neural circuitry can explain the delayed activities of PVT. Initially, the fear response is mediated by projections from the prelimbic cortex (PL) to the basolateral amygdala (BLA). This is shown by the fact that silencing the PL–BLA pathway disrupted fear retrieval in the early time point. However, the circuit shifts over time to involve the PL–PVT–central amygdala (CeA) pathway. During reintroduction of the stimulus after 24 hours, PL-PVT projections are active, and by day seven, PVT-CeA projections also show to be active. Silencing these projections disrupted the retrieval and maintenance of fear memory, highlighting the PVT's role in the long-term processing of emotionally salient experiences.

==== Stress ====
The PVT is associated with stress response, evidenced by changes in neuronal activities parallel with stressful stimuli. For instance, several studies have reported increased c-fos expression, a marker of neuronal activation. Moreover, stress stimuli have been shown to elevate calcium transients, brief calcium concentration increases within neurons, in D2 receptor-expressing neurons within the PVT.

The PVT also contributes to regulating chronic stress by interacting with the hypothalamic-pituitary-adrenal axis (HPA), which controls the fight-or-flight response. An experiment has shown that blocking orexin input to the PVT inhibits the facilitation of adrenocorticotropic hormone (ACTH) release from the HPA axis, thereby repressing chronic stress responses.
