= Aticaprant =

Investigational antidepressant compound

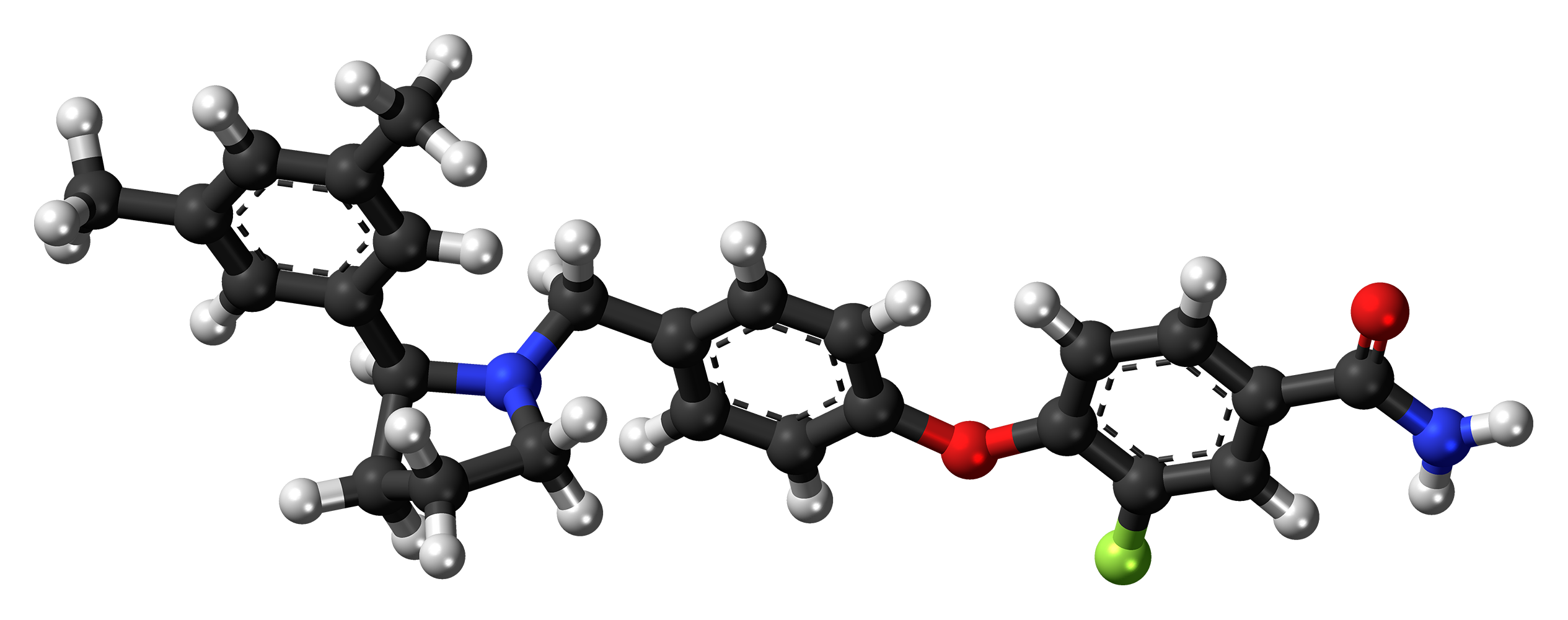

Clinical data
- Other names: JNJ-67953964; CERC-501; LY-2456302
- Routes of administration: Oral
- Drug class: κ-Opioid receptor antagonist
- ATC code: None

Pharmacokinetic data
- Bioavailability: 25%
- Elimination half-life: 30–40 hours

Identifiers
- IUPAC name: 4-(4-{[(2S)-2-(3,5-Dimethylphenyl)-1-pyrrolidinyl]methyl}}phenoxy)-3-fluorobenzamide
- CAS Number: 1174130-61-0
- PubChem CID: 44129648
- IUPHAR/BPS: 9194
- DrugBank: DB12341
- ChemSpider: 28424203
- UNII: DE4G8X55F5
- KEGG: D11831
- ChEMBL: ChEMBL1921847
- CompTox Dashboard (EPA): DTXSID90151777

Chemical and physical data
- Formula: C_{26}H_{27}FN_{2}O_{2}
- Molar mass: 418.512 g·mol^{−1}
- 3D model (JSmol): Interactive image
- SMILES: CC1=CC(=CC(=C1)[C@@H]2CCCN2CC3=CC=C(C=C3)OC4=C(C=C(C=C4)C(=O)N)F)C
- InChI: InChI=1S/C26H27FN2O2/c1-17-12-18(2)14-21(13-17)24-4-3-11-29(24)16-19-5-8-22(9-6-19)31-25-10-7-20(26(28)30)15-23(25)27/h5-10,12-15,24H,3-4,11,16H2,1-2H3,(H2,28,30)/t24-/m0/s1; Key:ZHPMYDSXGRRERG-DEOSSOPVSA-N

Aticaprant, also known by its developmental codes JNJ-67953964, CERC-501, and LY-2456302, is a κ-opioid receptor (KOR) antagonist which was under development for the treatment of major depressive disorder and other conditions. Aticaprant is taken orally.

Side effects of aticaprant include itching, among others. Aticaprant acts as a selective antagonist of the KOR, the biological target of the endogenous opioid peptide dynorphin. The medication has decent selectivity for the KOR over the μ-opioid receptor (MOR) and other targets, a relatively long half-life of 30 to 40 hours, and readily crosses the blood–brain barrier to produce central effects.

Aticaprant was originally developed by Eli Lilly, was under development by Cerecor for a time, and is now under development by Janssen Pharmaceuticals. In July 2022, it was in phase III clinical trials for major depressive disorder. In March 2025, Johnson & Johnson discontinued development of aticaprant for major depressive disorder due to lack of effectiveness in phase III trials.

Aticaprant was also under development for the treatment of alcoholism, cocaine use disorder, and nicotine withdrawal, but development for these indications was discontinued as well.

== Pharmacology ==
=== Pharmacodynamics ===
Aticaprant is a potent, selective, short-acting (i.e., non-"inactivating") antagonist of the KOR (K_{i} = 0.81 nM vs. 24.0 nM and 155 nM for the μ-opioid receptor (MOR) and δ-opioid receptor (DOR), respectively; approximately 30-fold selectivity for the KOR). The drug has been found to dose-dependently block fentanyl-induced miosis at 25 mg and 60 mg in humans (with minimal to no blockade at doses of 4 to 10 mg), suggesting that the drug significantly occupies and antagonizes the MOR at a dose of at least 25 mg but not of 10 mg or less. However, a more recent study assessing neuroendocrine effects of the drug in normal volunteers and subjects with a history of cocaine dependence reported observations consistent with modest MOR antagonism at the 10 mg dose. In animal models of depression, aticaprant has been found to have potent synergistic efficacy in combination with other antidepressants such as citalopram and imipramine.

Positron emission tomography imaging revealed that brain KORs were almost completely saturated by the drug 2.5 hours following a single dose of 10 mg, which supported the 4 mg to 25 mg dosages that aticaprant is being explored at in clinical trials. Occupancy was 35% for a 0.5 mg dose and 94% for a 10 mg dose. At 24 hours post-dose, receptor occupancy was 19% for 0.5 mg and 82% for 25 mg. No serious side effects were observed, and all side effects seen were mild to moderate and were not thought to be due to aticaprant.

=== Pharmacokinetics ===
The oral bioavailability of aticaprant is 25%. The drug is rapidly absorbed, with maximal concentrations occurring 1 to 2 hours after administration. It has an elimination half-life of 30 to 40 hours in healthy subjects. The circulating levels of aticaprant increase proportionally with increasing doses. Steady-state concentrations are reached after 6 to 8 days of once-daily dosing. Aticaprant has been shown to reproducibly penetrate the blood–brain barrier.

== History ==
Aticaprant was originally developed by Eli Lilly under the code name LY-2456302. It first appeared in the scientific literature in 2010 or 2011. The compound was first patented in 2009.

In February 2015, Cerecor Inc. announced that they had acquired the rights from Eli Lilly to develop and commercialize LY-2456302 (under the new developmental code CERC-501).

As of 2016, aticaprant has reached phase II clinical trials as an augmentation to antidepressant therapy for treatment-resistant depression. A phase II study of aticaprant in heavy smokers was commenced in early 2016 and results of the study were expected before the end of 2016. Aticaprant failed to meet its main endpoint for nicotine withdrawal in the study.

In August 2017, it was announced that Cerecor had sold its rights to aticaprant to Janssen Pharmaceuticals. Janssen was also experimenting with esketamine for the treatment of depression as of 2017.

In March 2025, Johnson & Johnson discontinued development of aticaprant for major depressive disorder due to lack of effectiveness in phase 3 trials. It has not completely discontinued aticaprant however and has said that it will continue to evaluate the drug in other areas. A regulatory application for approval of the medication had previously been expected to be submitted by 2025.

== Research ==
In addition to major depressive disorder, aticaprant was under development for the treatment of alcoholism, cocaine use disorder, and smoking withdrawal. However, development for these indications was discontinued.

== See also ==
- κ-Opioid receptor § Antagonists
- List of investigational antidepressants
- List of investigational substance-related disorder drugs
- Icalcaprant and navacaprant
