= Nalodeine =

Chemical compound

Clinical data
- Other names: N-Allylnorcodeine

Identifiers
- IUPAC name: (4R,4aR,7S,7aR,12bS)-9-methoxy-3-prop-2-enyl-2,4,4a,7,7a,13-hexahydro-1H-4,12-methanobenzofuro[3,2-e]isoquinoline-7-ol
- CAS Number: 56195-50-7
- PubChem CID: 5486632
- ChemSpider: 4588998
- UNII: YD9M6BEL6S
- CompTox Dashboard (EPA): DTXSID80971582

Chemical and physical data
- Formula: C_{20}H_{23}NO_{3}
- Molar mass: 325.408 g·mol^{−1}
- 3D model (JSmol): Interactive image
- SMILES: COC1=C2C3=C(CC4C5C3(CCN4CC=C)C(O2)C(C=C5)O)C=C1
- InChI: InChI=1S/C20H23NO3/c1-3-9-21-10-8-20-13-5-6-15(22)19(20)24-18-16(23-2)7-4-12(17(18)20)11-14(13)21/h3-7,13-15,19,22H,1,8-11H2,2H3/t13-,14+,15-,19-,20-/m0/s1; Key:XAOWELGMJQTJQR-WYIOCLOVSA-N

Nalodeine, also known more commonly as N-allylnorcodeine, is an opioid antagonist (specifically, an antagonist of the μ-opioid receptor) that was never marketed but is notable as the first opioid antagonist to be discovered. It was first reported in 1915 and was found to block the effects of morphine in animals. This was followed by the clinical introduction of nalorphine (N-allylnormorphine) in 1954, naloxone (N-allyloxymorphone) in 1960, and naltrexone (N-methylcyclopropyloxymorphone) in 1963. Nalmefene (6-desoxy-6-methylene-naltrexone), another structurally related opioid antagonist derivative, was also subsequently introduced, in 1996. In animals, nalodeine both reverses morphine- and heroin-induced respiratory depression and acts as a respiratory stimulant in its own right (i.e., when given alone). Similarly to nalorphine, nalodeine has also been found to act as an agonist of the κ-opioid receptor.

== See also ==
- Levallorphan
- Norcodeine
- Nalbuphine
- Buprenorphine
- Diprenorphine
- Samidorphan
