= Buprenorphine/naltrexone =

Combination drug formulation

Combination of
- Buprenorphine: Opioid modulator
- Naltrexone: Opioid antagonist

Legal status
- Legal status: US: Schedule III

Identifiers
- CAS Number: 126635-03-8

Buprenorphine/naltrexone is an experimental combination drug formulation of buprenorphine, a μ-opioid receptor (MOR) weak partial agonist and κ-opioid receptor (KOR) antagonist, and naltrexone, a MOR and KOR silent antagonist, which is under investigation for the potential treatment of psychiatric disorders. The combination of the two drugs is thought to result in a selective blockade of the KOR and hence fewer MOR activation-related concerns such as euphoria and opioid dependence. It has been found to produce antidepressant-like effects in mice (similarly to the case of buprenorphine alone or in combination with samidorphan) and (at a buprenorphine dosage of 16 mg/day but not 4 mg/day) has recently been found to be effective in the treatment of cocaine dependence in a large clinical trial.

== See also ==
- Buprenorphine/samidorphan
- Buprenorphine/naloxone
