= John David Sinclair =

American researcher (1943-2015)

- Born: March 28, 1943; Bluefield, West Virginia, U.S.
- Died: April 6, 2015 (aged 72); Evitskog, Finland
- Occupations: Scientist; researcher
- Known for: The Sinclair Method, Pharmacological extinction
- Spouse: Kirsti Kaarina Laine (m. 1973–2015)
- Children: Stephanie Sinclair Lappi, Joanna Sinclair, Pamela Sinclair, Annette Sinclair

John David Sinclair (March 28, 1943 – April 6, 2015) was an American scientist and researcher best known for discovering the Alcohol Deprivation Effect (ADE) and targeted pharmacological extinction, otherwise known as the Sinclair Method, as a medication treatment for Alcohol Use Disorder (AUD).

== Early life ==
Sinclair was born March 28, 1943, in Bluefield, West Virginia, and grew up in Fairmont. He was the son of John and June Biddle Sinclair, having a sister Vicki and brother Stephen.

== Education ==
He graduated from Fairmont Senior High School, and attended Carnegie Tech University. At the University of Cincinnati he was a teaching and research assistant from 1963 to 1967 whilst gaining his bachelor's degree (1965) and his master's degree (1967). From 1967 to 1970, he was National Defense Education Act fellow at the University of Oregon, Eugene, and from 1970 to 1971 National Science Foundation trainee, gaining his Ph.D. from the University of Oregon (1972).

== Career ==
Sinclair's research work for his master's degree and PhD led to the discovery of the alcohol deprivation effect (ADE). Contrary to earlier beliefs, detoxification and alcohol deprivation did not stop alcohol craving but in fact increased subsequent alcohol drinking.

After getting his doctorate in 1972 from the University of Oregon on the ADE, Sinclair immediately went to Helsinki to work at Alko Laboratories (now part of Finland's National Public Health Institute). Research here showed that alcohol drinking is a learned behavior and in most cases the reinforcement from alcohol involved the opioid system, i.e., the same system where morphine, heroin, and endorphin produce their effects. Taking an opioid antagonist such as naltrexone or nalmefene reduces the reinforcement such that a person is no longer interested in alcohol.

This solution, pharmacological extinction, became apparent when he wrote The Rest Principle: A Neurophysiological Theory of Behavior. In the late 1990s in Finland, David Sinclair was one of the founders of Contral Clinics to study the efficacy and security of The Sinclair Method. Since then, Contral Clinics, an outpatient facility, has treated thousands with a success rate of 78%. The Sinclair Method, as the protocol has been named, was the subject of a large body of laboratory studies and used in over 90 clinical trials around the world.

The Sinclair Method, which is simply taking an opioid antagonist before drinking, has been found to be successful in about 80% of Alcohol Use Disorder (AUD) sufferers. The method's unconventional requirement for drinking to continue during treatment conflicts with the tenets of traditional abstinence-based treatment, and is a significant barrier to wider acceptance by the treatment community. More recent publications have seen greater acceptance by medical professionals.

Targeted pharmacological extinction is explained in Roy Eskapa's book, The Cure for Alcoholism, written with the assistance of Sinclair. The C Three Foundation, founded by Claudia Christian, is the world's only non-profit organization dedicated to raising awareness of the Sinclair Method for treating and preventing alcohol use disorder. One Little Pill is a documentary film about the use of generic medications (primarily naltrexone, but also nalmefene) for treating and curing alcohol use disorder.

In later years, Sinclair was the chief science officer with Lightlake Therapeutics (now named Opiant Pharmaceuticals), doing research until his retirement using a similar method for the treatment of binge eating. He also worked with Stephen Cox to try and create a treatment for panic attacks using a pipe that reduces the amount of carbon dioxide being inhaled.

He was a member of the American Association for the Advancement of Science, International Society for Biomedical Research on Alcoholism, International Behavioral Neuroscience Society, and Research Society on Alcoholism.
