= Naltrexone/bupropion =

Medication for treatment of obesity

- Skeletal structures of bupropion (top) and naltrexone (bottom)

Combination of
- Naltrexone: Opioid receptor antagonist
- Bupropion: Norepinephrine-dopamine reuptake inhibitor and nicotinic acetylcholine receptor antagonist

Clinical data
- Trade names: Contrave, Mysimba
- AHFS/Drugs.com: Monograph
- Routes of administration: By mouth
- ATC code: A08AA62 (WHO)

Legal status
- Legal status: AU: S4 (Prescription only); CA: ℞-only; US: ℞-only; EU: Rx-only

Identifiers
- CAS Number: 1201668-08-7
- PubChem CID: 11556075
- KEGG: D10751

Naltrexone/bupropion, sold under the brand name Contrave among others, is a fixed-dose combination medication for the management of chronic obesity in adults in combination with a reduced-calorie diet and increased physical activity. It contains naltrexone, an opioid antagonist, and bupropion, an aminoketone atypical antidepressant. It is taken by mouth. Both component medications have individually demonstrated some evidence of effectiveness in promoting weight loss, and the combination has been shown to produce some synergistic effects on weight.

In September 2014, a sustained release formulation of the drug was approved for marketing in the United States under the brand name Contrave. The combination, sold under the brand name Mysimba, was subsequently approved by the European Medicines Agency for medical use in the European Union in the spring of 2015. It was approved in Canada under the Contrave brand name in 2018.

== Medical uses ==
Naltrexone/bupropion is indicated, as an adjunct to a reduced-calorie diet and increased physical activity, as anti-obesity medication for the management of weight in adults with an initial body mass index (BMI) of:

- 30 kg/m^{2} (obese), or
- 27 kg/m^{2} to <30 kg/m^{2} (overweight) in the presence of one or more weight-related comorbidities, like type 2 diabetes, dyslipidaemia, or controlled high blood pressure

=== Available forms ===
Each Contrave tablet contains 8 mg naltrexone and 90 mg bupropion. Once full dosing is reached (after 4 weeks of administration), the total dosage of Contrave for treating overweight or obesity is two tablets twice daily or 32 mg naltrexone and 360 mg bupropion per day.

== Contraindications ==
According to the U.S. Food and Drug Administration (FDA), naltrexone/bupropion is contraindicated in patients who have/are:

- History of seizures
- History of an eating disorder such as bulimia nervosa or anorexia nervosa
- Taking opioids, or are in opiate withdrawal.
- Taken monoamine oxidase inhibitors in the last 14 days
- Pregnant
- Abruptly stopped use of alcohol, benzodiazepines, barbiturates, or antiepileptic drugs

== Adverse effects ==
The FDA has issued a boxed warning regarding an increased risk for suicidal thoughts and behavior in children, adolescents, and young adults under the age of 25. This is attributed to the bupropion component, as the FDA requires all antidepressants to include that boxed warning on medication package inserts. The safety and effectiveness of naltrexone/bupropion in children under the age of 18 has not been studied.

== Mechanism of action ==
Individually, naltrexone and bupropion each target pathways in the central nervous system that influence appetite and energy use.

- Bupropion is a reuptake inhibitor of both norepinephrine and dopamine and a nicotinic acetylcholine receptor antagonist. It activates proopiomelanocortin (POMC) neurons in the hypothalamus, producing a downstream loss of appetite and increased energy output. The POMC is regulated by endogenous opioids via opioid-mediated negative feedback.
- Naltrexone is a pure opioid antagonist, which further augments bupropion's activation of the POMC.

Combined, naltrexone/bupropion affects the reward pathway, which results in reduced food cravings. In 2009, Monash University physiologist Michael Cowley was awarded one of Australia's top research honors, the Commonwealth Science Minister's Prize for Life Scientist of the Year, in recognition of his elucidation of these pathways, which led to the development of the combination medication.

== History ==
Orexigen Therapeutics submitted a New Drug Application (NDA) for the combination to the FDA in March 2010. Having paid a fee under the Prescription Drug User Fee Act, Orexigen was given a deadline for the FDA to approve or reject the drug of January 2011. In December 2010, an FDA Advisory Committee voted 13–7 to approve Contrave and 11–8 to conduct a post-marketing cardiovascular outcomes study. Subsequently, on 2 February 2011, the FDA rejected the drug, and it was decided that an extremely large-scale study of the long-term cardiovascular effects of Contrave would be needed before approval could be considered. It was ultimately approved in the United States in 2014.

In December 2014, the Committee for Medicinal Products for Human Use (CHMP) of the European Medicines Agency endorsed the combination for licensure as an obesity medication when used alongside diet and exercise. Authorization was granted in March 2015. A review of Mysimba was completed by the CHMP in March 2025.

In May 2015, Orexigen prematurely ended the trial that was intended to test whether naltrexone/bupropion increased the risk of major adverse cardiovascular events in obese patients with cardiovascular disease because an independent panel of experts said that the drug maker "inappropriately" compromised the trial by prematurely releasing interim data. The early data release reported a reduction in heart attacks, but that advantage was no longer observed when a more complete view of the data was analyzed. The company then initiated a second trial (CONVENE) designed to test this outcome in 2016, but it was terminated in 2016 shortly after Takeda announced that it would sell its rights to the drug in the US to Orexigen.

In 2018, Orexigen sold its assets, including Contrave, to Nalpropion Pharmaceuticals.

== Society and culture ==
=== Economics ===
The sustained-release formulation, Contrave, is marketed by Takeda under license from the combination medication's developer, Orexigen Therapeutics. As of 2015, Orexigen received 20% of net sales from Takeda.
