= 6β-Naltrexol-d4 =

Chemical compound

Clinical data
- ATC code: None

Identifiers
- IUPAC name: (1S,5R,13R,14R,17S)-4-(cyclopropylmethyl)(13,14,15,15-^{2}H_{4})-12-oxa-4-azapentacyclo[9.6.1.0^{1,13}.0^{5,17}.0^{7,18}]octadeca-7(18),8,10-triene-10,14,17-triol
- CAS Number: 1279034-32-0
- PubChem CID: 46782432
- ChemSpider: 58783513
- UNII: PQ8P3KXF3E
- CompTox Dashboard (EPA): DTXSID501018245

Chemical and physical data
- Formula: C_{20}H_{21}D_{4}NO_{4}
- Molar mass: 347.445 g·mol^{−1}
- 3D model (JSmol): Interactive image
- SMILES: O[C@@]1(C(C[C@@]2(O)[C@H]3Cc4ccc(O)c5O[C@@]1([C@]2(CCN3CC6CC6)c45)[2H])([2H])[2H])[2H]
- InChI: InChI=1S/C20H25NO4/c22-13-4-3-12-9-15-20(24)6-5-14(23)18-19(20,16(12)17(13)25-18)7-8-21(15)10-11-1-2-11/h3-4,11,14-15,18,22-24H,1-2,5-10H2/t14-,15-,18+,19+,20-/m1/s1/i5D2,14D,18D; Key:JLVNEHKORQFVQJ-NCRVCFHNSA-N

6β-Naltrexol-d4, also known as 6β-hydroxynaltrexone-d4, is a deuterium-labeled form of 6β-naltrexol used for NMR imaging. Unlike opioid inverse agonists such as naloxone and naltrexone (which are often dubbed "antagonists" for simplicity's sake), 6β-naltrexol and 6β-naltrexol-d4 are opioid neutral antagonists.
