= CTAP (peptide) =

Opioid antagonist peptide selective for the mu receptor

Names
- IUPAC name (4R,7S,10S,13R,16S,19R)-N-[(2S,3R)-1-amino-3-hydroxy-1-oxobutan-2-yl]-19-[[(2R)-2-amino-3-phenylpropanoyl]amino]-10-[3-(diaminomethylideneamino)propyl]-7-[(1R)-1-hydroxyethyl]-16-[(4-hydroxyphenyl)methyl]-13-(1H-indol-3-ylmethyl)-3,3-dimethyl-6,9,12,15,18-pentaoxo-1,2-dithia-5,8,11,14,17-pentazacycloicosane-4-carboxamide

Identifiers
CAS Number	103429-32-9
3D model (JSmol)	Interactive image
ChEMBL	ChEMBL1795717
ChemSpider	8594132
IUPHAR/BPS	1635
PubChem CID	10418702
- InChI: InChI=1S/C51H69N13O11S2/c1-26(65)39(42(53)68)62-49(75)41-51(3,4)77-76-25-38(61-43(69)33(52)21-28-11-6-5-7-12-28)47(73)59-36(22-29-16-18-31(67)19-17-29)45(71)60-37(23-30-24-57-34-14-9-8-13-32(30)34)46(72)58-35(15-10-20-56-50(54)55)44(70)63-40(27(2)66)48(74)64-41/h5-9,11-14,16-19,24,26-27,33,35-41,57,65-67H,10,15,20-23,25,52H2,1-4H3,(H2,53,68)(H,58,72)(H,59,73)(H,60,71)(H,61,69)(H,62,75)(H,63,70)(H,64,74)(H4,54,55,56)/t26-,27-,33-,35+,36+,37-,38+,39+,40+,41-/m1/s1 Key: OFMQLVRLOGHAJI-FGHAYEPSSA-N
- SMILES: C[C@H]([C@H]1C(=O)N[C@@H](C(SSC[C@@H](C(=O)N[C@H](C(=O)N[C@@H](C(=O)N[C@H](C(=O)N1)CCCN=C(N)N)CC2=CNC3=CC=CC=C32)CC4=CC=C(C=C4)O)NC(=O)[C@@H](CC5=CC=CC=C5)N)(C)C)C(=O)N[C@@H]([C@@H](C)O)C(=O)N)O

Properties
Chemical formula	C_{51}H_{69}N_{13}O_{11}S_{2}
Molar mass	1104.31 g·mol^{−1}
- Except where otherwise noted, data are given for materials in their standard state (at 25 °C [77 °F], 100 kPa). Infobox references

CTAP is an opioid antagonist peptide, which is an analogue of somatostatin. It displays high selectivity for the mu-opioid receptor.

== Pharmacology ==
CTAP is described as being a mu-selective opioid antagonist. In other words, when blocking opioid receptors, it is much more selective for the mu-opioid receptors than the other receptors. For example, in Norway rats, it has an IC_{50} value of 0.0021 μM at mu opioid 1 receptors, but has a value of 5.31 μM at delta opioid 1 receptors, which shows that it is much more selective for mu receptors, as can be seen by the smaller value. Additionally, it is able to cross the blood–brain barrier (BBB).
