= Olanzapine/samidorphan =

Combination drug

Combination of
- Olanzapine: Atypical antipsychotic
- Samidorphan: Opioid antagonist

Clinical data
- Trade names: Lybalvi
- Other names: ALKS-3831; OLZ/SAM
- AHFS/Drugs.com: Micromedex Detailed Consumer Information
- MedlinePlus: a621051
- License data: US DailyMed: Olanzapine and samidorphan
- Routes of administration: By mouth
- ATC code: N05AH53 (WHO)

Legal status
- Legal status: US: ℞-only

Identifiers
- KEGG: D12117

Olanzapine/samidorphan, sold under the brand name Lybalvi, is a fixed-dose combination medication for the treatment of schizophrenia and bipolar I disorder. It contains olanzapine, an atypical antipsychotic, and samidorphan, an opioid antagonist. Samidorphan reduces the weight gain associated with olanzapine while still allowing olanzapine to exert its therapeutic effect. The formulation was approved for medical use in the United States in May 2021.

== See also ==
- List of investigational antipsychotics
