= Orexigen Therapeutics =

Orexigen Therapeutics, Inc.
- Type: Public
- Traded as: Nasdaq: OREX
- Founded: 2002; 24 years ago
- Founder: Eckard Weber
- Headquarters: La Jolla, California, U.S.
- Website: orexigen.com

Orexigen Therapeutics, Inc. is a public American pharmaceutical company focused on development of treatments for obesity. The company is based in La Jolla, California and was established by Eckard Weber in 2002. As a public company, Orexigen is publicly listed on the NASDAQ exchange under the stock symbol OREX.

The company has a single product, Contrave, approved for use in the United States in 2014. Contrave was designed not only to curb hunger but also reduce cravings. Observation of the market performance of Qsymia and Belviq suggest overall low demand for pharmaceutical obesity therapies, calling into question earnings potential for Orexigen's offering.

Orexigen declared bankruptcy in 2018 and was sold to Nalpropion.
