= Opioid overdose =

Toxicity due to excessive consumption of opiates

- Other names: Narcotic overdose, opioid poisoning
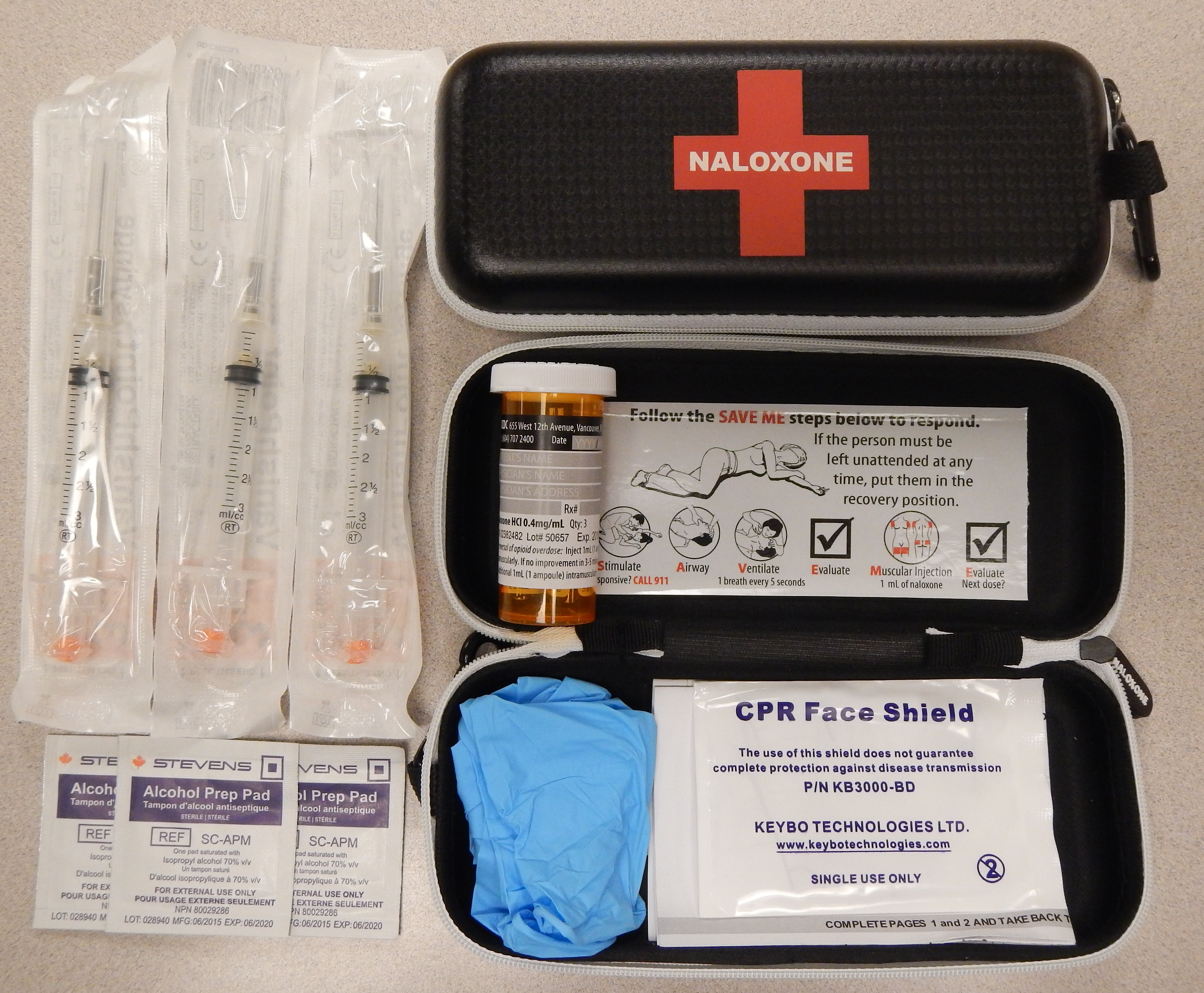
- A naloxone kit distributed in British Columbia, Canada
- Specialty: Toxicology, emergency medicine
- Symptoms: Respiratory depression, small pupils, unconsciousness
- Complications: Permanent brain damage, cardiac arrest
- Causes: Opioids (morphine, codeine, heroin, fentanyl, tramadol, methadone, etc.)
- Risk factors: Opioid dependence, metabolic disorders, use of high doses of opioids, injection of opioids, use with antidepressants, alcohol, benzodiazepines, and cocaine.
- Diagnostic method: Based on symptoms
- Differential diagnosis: Low blood sugar, alcohol intoxication, head trauma, stroke
- Prevention: Improved access to naloxone, treatment of opioid dependence
- Treatment: Supporting a person's breathing and naloxone
- Deaths: over 110,000 (2017)

An opioid overdose is toxicity due to excessive consumption of opioids, such as morphine, codeine, heroin, fentanyl, tramadol, Oxycodone, and methadone. This preventable pathology can be fatal if it leads to respiratory depression, a lethal condition that can cause hypoxia from slow and shallow breathing. Other symptoms include small pupils (Note: In the case of pethidine (brand name Demerol) in particular, extreme overdose may produce dilated pupils instead, due to this drug's tendency to produce non-opioid central nervous system toxicity and excitation at elevated doses.) and unconsciousness; however, its onset can depend on the method of ingestion, the dosage and individual risk factors. Although there were over 110,000 deaths in 2017 due to opioids, individuals who survived also faced adverse complications, including permanent brain damage.

Opioid overdoses are diagnosed based on symptoms and examination. Risk factors for opioid overdose include high levels of opioid dependence, use of opioids via injection, high-dose opioid usage, having a mental disorder or having a predisposition for one, and use of opioids in combination with other substances, such as alcohol, benzodiazepines, or cocaine. Dependence on prescription opioids can occur from their use to treat chronic pain in individuals. Additionally, if following a period of detoxification, which allows the tolerance level to fall, the risk of overdose upon return to use is high.

Initial treatment of an overdose involves supporting the person's breathing and providing oxygen to reduce the risk of hypoxia. Naloxone is then recommended to those who cannot reverse the opioid's effects through breathing. Giving naloxone via nasal administration or as an injection into a muscle has shown to be equally effective. Other efforts to prevent deaths from overdose include increasing access to naloxone and treatment for opioid dependence.

Drug use contributes to 500,000 deaths worldwide, with opioid overdose resulting in approximately 115,000 of these deaths in 2018. This is up from 18,000 deaths in 1990. In 2018, approximately 269 million people had engaged in drug usage at least once, 58 million of which used opioids. Drug use disorders have affected around 35.6 million people worldwide in 2018. The WHO estimates that 70% of deaths due to drug use are in relation to opioids, with 30% being due to overdose. It is believed that the opioid epidemic has partly been caused due to assurances that prescription opioids were safe, by the pharmaceutical industry in the 1990s. This led to unwarranted trust and a subsequent heavy reliance on opioids. Though there are treatment interventions which can effectively reduce the risk of overdose in people with opioid dependence, less than 10% of affected individuals receive it.

== Signs and symptoms ==
Opiate overdose symptoms and signs can be referred to as the "opioid toxidrome triad": decreased level of consciousness, pinpoint pupils, and respiratory depression. Other signs and symptoms include seizures and muscle spasms. Sometimes, an opiate overdose can lead to such a decreased level of consciousness that the person will not wake up.

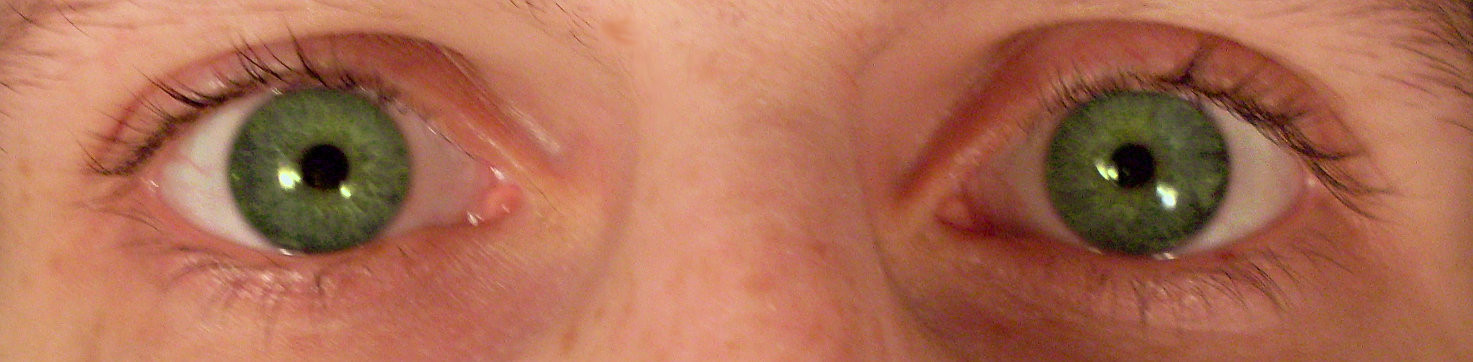
Pinpoint pupils, or miosis, caused by opioids

Because of their effect on the part of the brain that regulates breathing, opioids can cause very slow or stopped breathing during overdoses, leading to hypoxia or death if left untreated. Hypoxia is typically caused by respiratory depression. The brain uses oxygen to regulate the homeostasis of the body. In animal studies, it was found that opioids act on specific regions of the central nervous system associated with respiratory regulation, including the medulla and pons. During cerebral hypoxia, the brain lacks sufficient oxygen supply. Prolonged lack of oxygenation from respiratory depression can lead to detrimental damage to the brain and spinal cord and can leave the person unable to walk or function normally, even if treatment with naloxone is given.

Alcohol also causes respiratory depression and, therefore, when taken with opioids, can increase the risk of respiratory depression and death.

In young children, opioid overdose may not be apparent right away. This is due to absorption, distribution, and metabolism differences between young children and adults and the higher amount of opioid ingestion per kilogram of body weight.

== Causes ==
Fentanyl. 2 mg (white powder to the right) is a lethal dose in most people. US penny is 19 mm (0.75 in) wide.

Risk factors for opioid overdose include opioid dependence, injecting opioids, using high doses of opioids, and use together with alcohol, benzodiazepines, or cocaine. The risk is particularly high following detoxification. Dependence on prescription opioids can occur from their use to treat chronic pain. In young children, an overdose is usually due to opioids that are intended for their parents, older siblings, or grandparents. In mothers who take codeine during breastfeeding, opioid overdoses have occurred in their baby. Codeine is, therefore, not recommended for those who are breastfeeding.

=== Co-ingestion ===
Opioid overdoses are often associated with benzodiazepines, tranquilisers (e.g. xylazine) or alcohol use. Other central nervous system depressants, muscle relaxers, pain relievers, anti-convulsants, anxiolytics, treatment drugs of a psychoactive or epileptic variety or any other such drug with its active function meant to calm or mitigate neuronal signaling (barbiturates, etc.) can additionally cause a worsened condition with less likelihood of recovery cumulative to each added drug. This includes drugs less immediately classed to a slowing of the metabolism such as with GABAergic like GHB or glutamatergic antagonists like PCP or ketamine.

== Risk factors ==
End organ dysfunction (liver disease), which may lead to decreased drug clearance, is a risk factor for opioid overdose. Other risk factors for opioid overdose include sleep disordered breathing disorders such as sleep apnea, pulmonary diseases (such as asthma or chronic obstructive pulmonary disease) which may reduce ventilation and concomitant use of sedating medications such as benzodiazepines, gabapentinoids, muscle relaxants and other central nervous system depressants. Benzodiazepine use with opioids increases the risk of overdose death by four-fold, whereas concomitant use with gabapentintoids such as gabapentin or pregabalin increases the risk of overdose death by nearly two-fold.

Higher doses of prescription opioids, as well as long-acting formulations, are associated with an increased risk of overdose. In those on long-term opioid treatment for chronic pain, daily morphine equivalents greater than 200 mg were associated with death from opioid related causes (including overdose) in 3.8% of men and 2.2% of women. Opioids are the most common cause for serious accidental poisonings of children in the UK.

=== Metabolic disorders ===
Opioids are primarily metabolized in the liver, before being excreted through urine. Opioids are metabolized by phase 1 and/or phase 2 metabolism, which can lead to the activation or inhibition of these drugs. Phase 1 metabolism is the CYP pathway which consists of different cytochrome P450s – a set of enzymes that catalyze hydrolysis, reduction, and oxidation reactions – to create an active metabolite. In contrast, Phase 2 metabolism causes the opioids to undergo conjugation, with little to no interaction with the CYP pathway. The opioids undergo phase 1 and phase 2 metabolism until they are hydrophilic enough to be renally excreted.

Various factors play a role in how an opioid is metabolized. In phase 1 metabolism, the CYP family has several polymorphisms, which can account for the difference in therapeutic responses within each individual. This diversification leads to opioids being modified at varying rates, which can cause the drug to remain in the bloodstream for either a longer or shorter period. Therefore, these polymorphisms control opioid tolerance and facilitate overdose.

=== Mental health ===
Evidence suggests that mental health can be a significant facilitator for opioid use disorder. Given that opioids are prescribed for pain management, mental health disorders, such as depression, have been shown to increase use of opioids when treating conditions associated with chronic pain. Evidence has shown that individuals with mood and anxiety disorders have an increased likelihood of being prescribed opioids and continuing usage for lengthy periods of time, consequently increasing likelihood for dependence. As such, affected individuals have almost double the risk of using opioids for pain relief in the long-term. Additionally, mental health challenges associated with trauma, economic depression, social environments conducive to substance use and risk-taking behaviours have been shown to increase opioid misuse. Furthermore, mental health challenges associated with cardiovascular disease, sleep disorders, and HIV can cause opioid dependence and subsequent overdose. Notably, cyclic behaviours can be observed between mental illness and opioid use disorder where individuals with mental health diagnoses engage in opioid use which further perpetuates mental health challenges and increased drug usage.

== Mechanism ==
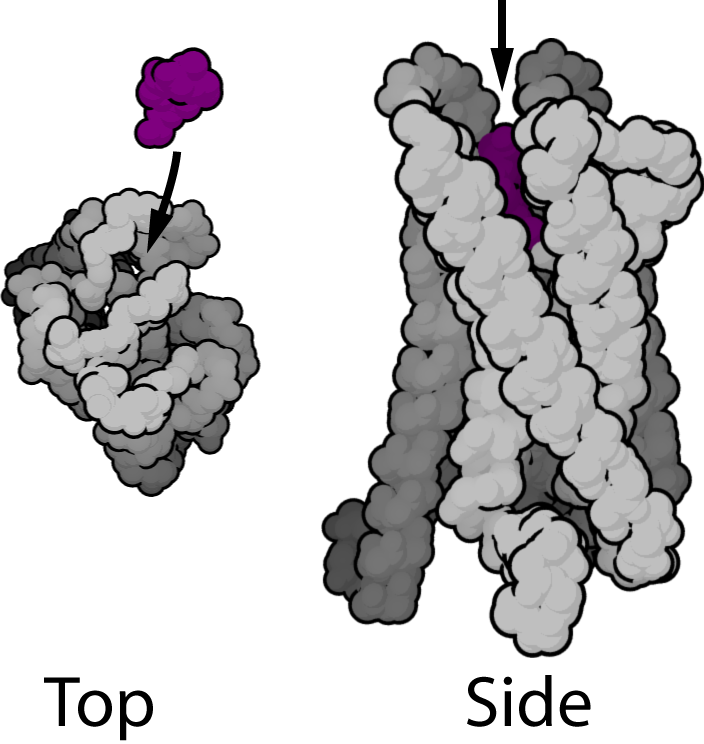
Mu opioid receptor (a GPCR)

Opioids bind with neural opioid receptors to provoke analgesic, sedative, and euphoric effects. Opioids function by stimulating specific G-protein coupled receptors distributed throughout the body—including the brain, skin and spinal cord. Three of the major opioid receptors include mu, kappa, delta, and nociception, each playing a role in eliciting the effects associated with opioids. An opioid overdose results from over-activation of these receptors, which can cause permanent brain damage from cerebral hypoxia or neurotoxicity.

Mu receptors have an analgesic effect on the brain, and are found in various parts of the nervous system including the cerebral cortex and thalamus. They can be found in the nucleus accumbens, the pleasure centre of the brain, as well as the amygdala. Kappa receptors, in the hypothalamus, produce a similar analgesic effect. They bind with dynorphins to stimulate anti-reward effects (dysphoria) and other negative effects of withdrawal. While mu receptors are the source of addiction, kappa receptors contribute to continued use. They generate dysphoria in response to increasing stress levels via corticotropin-releasing factor (CRF). This increases erratic shifts in mood during the withdrawal period and can prompt relapse. Delta receptors, found in the basal ganglia of the limbic system, have been shown to reduce anxiety by binding with enkephalins, although this requires further research. The most recent addition to these receptors are nociception opioid receptors. Although they have been determined to be receptors to certain ligands from opioids, their role is not yet fully understood.

When opioids are ingested, the ligand binds to these constitutively active receptors to reduce neural activity. This is accomplished by inhibiting adenylyl cyclase and cyclic AMP, which are necessary for communication within the central nervous system. There is research indicating that opioids reduce pain by disrupting ion channels and vesicle fusion.

Prolonged exposure to opioids can cause these receptors to become internalized, leading to increased tolerance and increased opioid use.

== Prevention ==
Opioid overdoses can often be prevented. Clear protocols for staff at emergency departments and urgent care centers can reduce opioid prescriptions for individuals presenting in these settings who engage in drug seeking behaviors or who have a history of a substance use disorder. Drug seeking behaviors include but are not limited to obsessiveness or impatience when it comes to attaining medications, seeking multiple pain adjunct medications, and inconsistent physiological presentation. A prescription monitoring program may help determine if an individual is receiving a high doses of opioids or combinations of medications such as benzodiazepines and opioids that put them at high risk. Limited amount of evidence suggests opioid therapy with extended-release or long-acting formulations may increase the risk of an unintentional overdose compared to shorter-acting agents. Routinely screening using tools such as the CAGE-AID and the Drug Abuse Screening Test (DAST-10) in adults and the CRAFFT in those aged 14–18 years is recommended. The revised risk index for overdose or severe opioid induced respiratory depression (RIOSORD) is a validated screening tool that may be used to estimate the risk of overdose in people using opioids, or the rapid opioid dependence screen may be used as a more rapid and succinct method to screen for opioid use disorder. Other "drug seeking" behaviors and physical indications of drug use should be used as clues to perform formal screenings.

There are several medication-assisted treatments available for people with opioid use disorder or opioid dependence who are at higher risk for opioid overdose. The selection of treatment depends on various factors, such as a person's preference, accessibility, and history of treatment. Examples of medication-assisted treatments are buprenorphine (with or without naloxone), naltrexone, and methadone. Methadone and buprenorphine are associated with reduced mortality in those with opioid use disorder as well as higher drug treatment program retention, lower illicit drug use, and decreased overdose deaths. The mortality benefit of long-term naltrexone use in those with opioid use disorder is less well-established. After a non-fatal opioid overdose, subsequent methadone or buprenorphine initiation and use reduce the risk of overdose death by 59% and 38%, respectively. Initiating buprenorphine in the emergency department is associated with lower mortality and increased adherence to opioid use disorder treatment programs. Peer support groups have tentative evidence of benefit. There is also some evidence indicating benefits in community-based overdose education and naloxone distribution programs. Buprenorphine and methadone can help decrease drug cravings. Combining pharmacologic treatments with behavioral therapy, such as support or recovery groups, can increase the likelihood of overcoming addiction and reduce the risk of an opioid overdose.

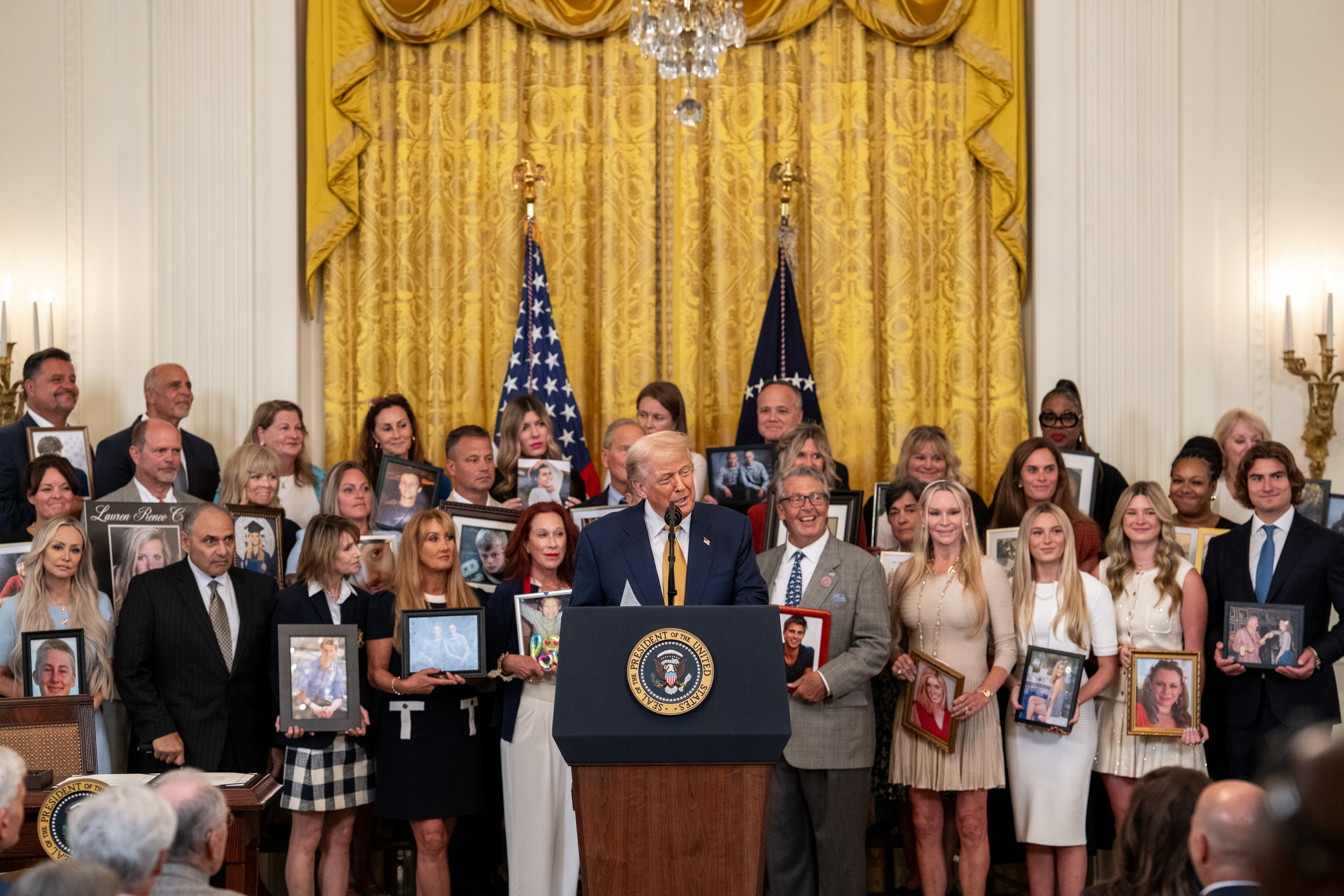
President Trump with families of overdose victims after signing the HALT Fentanyl Act, 16 July 2025

Individuals diagnosed with opioid dependence should be prescribed naloxone to prevent overdose. They should be directed to one of the treatment options available, such as needle exchange programs and treatment centers. A naloxone prescription is also recommended when risk factors for opioid overdose are present, such as a history of overdose, substance use disorder, or higher doses of opioids. With the CDC recommending naloxone be provided to all people on long term opioids who have risk factors for overdose, including a history of a substance use disorder, daily morphine equivalents greater than 50 mg or concurrent benzodiazepine use. Brief motivational interviewing can also be performed and has been shown to improve people's motivation to change their behavior. Despite these opportunities, the dissemination of prevention interventions in the US has been hampered by the lack of coordination and sluggish federal government response.

Unused or old opioids should not be stored in the home as there is a risk of people using the drugs for non-medical purposes. Among adolescents and young-adults, non-medical use of prescription opioids is associated with a subsequent 13-fold increased risk of heroin use later in life. Opioids that are no longer being used may be taken to drug take back programs at local pharmacies, healthcare facilities or law enforcement agencies for safe disposal. The United States Food and Drug Administration also has a "flush list"; a list of medications that may be safely disposed of by flushing down the toilet.

In the United States, 49 states and the District of Columbia have expanded naloxone access at a pharmacy level via standing order, protocol order, naloxone-specific collaborative practice agreement, or pharmacist prescriptive authority.

== Treatments ==
If someone is suspected to have overdosed on opioids, call for medical attention, administer naloxone, and provide basic life support as soon as possible.

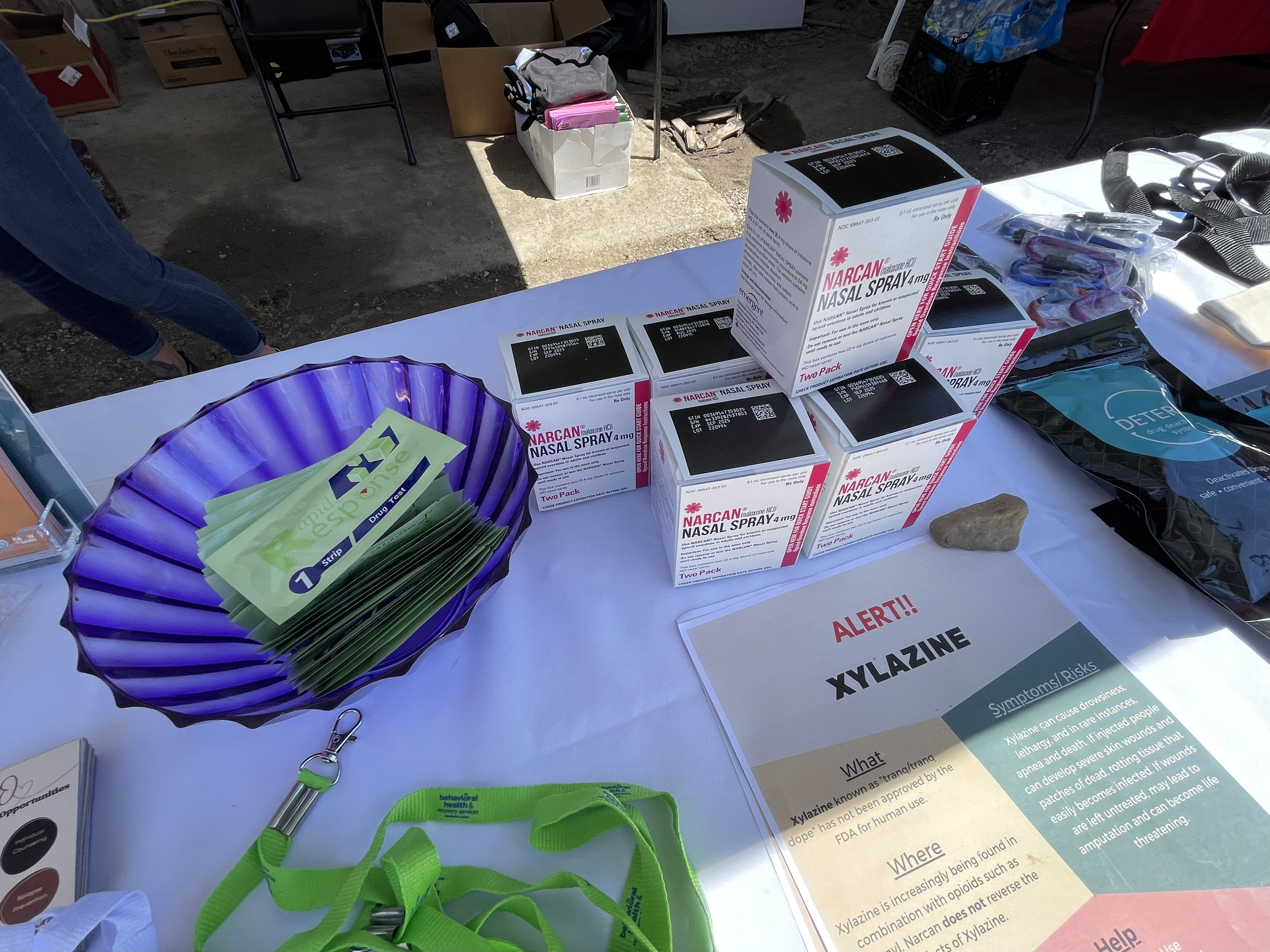
Free Narcan and test strips at a community event in Hopland, California

=== Naloxone ===
Naloxone works by temporarily blocking the effects of opioids, including respiratory depression and sedation. Naloxone is safe and side effects are rare, generally limited to allergic reactions. It should be given if there is any suspicion of an opioid overdose. Naloxone is available to the public in the United States in two routes of administration: intranasal and intramuscular/subcutaneous. Intranasal forms include Narcan, approved in 2015, and Kloxxado, approved in 2021. Formulations that are injectable into the intramuscular or subcutaneous spaces include Evzio, approved in 2014, and Zimhi, approved in 2021. The doses are approved for both children and adults and may be repeated every 2–3 minutes. Synthetic opioids like fentanyl and carfentanil are much more potent than prescription opioids and heroin. There is some debate about whether increased doses of naloxone are required to reverse overdose from synthetic opioids; however, this concern has prompted FDA approval of higher dose naloxone formulations such as Kloxxado and Zimhi. The effects of naloxone last for approximately 30-90 minutes, at which point opioids present in the body may begin to take effect again depending on the specific opioids duration of action. Therefore, transport to a hospital is indicated after naloxone administration, and the medication may need to be re-administered.

Naloxone Formulations for Public Use in the US
Brand name	Route of Administration	Dose	Additional Considerations
Narcan	Intranasal	4 mg	
Kloxxado	Intranasal	8 mg	
Evzio	Intramuscular/subcutaneous auto-injector	2 mg	
Zimhi	Intramuscular/subcutaneous prefilled syringe	5 mg	For individuals 12 years of age or older

==== Access to Naloxone ====
Opioid overdose should be reversed as soon as possible. To shorten the time between overdose and naloxone administration, multiple programs have been enacted to improve naloxone access for drug users, caregivers, and first responders. In the US, these efforts include FDA approval of intranasal and injectable naloxone over the counter, professional organizations recommending physicians to co-prescribe naloxone when opioids are used for pain management, free community overdose education and naloxone distribution (OEND) programs, and efforts to train non-medical first responders such as firefighters and police to use naloxone. These actions have reduced opioid-related deaths at the state and national levels and are cost-effective.

In the UK, naloxone is a prescription-only medicine, but drug treatment services can supply it without a prescription. In an emergency, anyone can use it as a life-saving measure.

In August 2024, a new device was developed by researchers at MIT and Brigham and Women's Hospital that can be implanted under the skin, which rapidly releases naloxone when an overdose is detected.

=== Basic Life Support ===
Opioid overdose leads to death when people stop breathing. Bystanders trained in first aid can evaluate people who have overdosed and provide basic life support including rescue breathing via bag valve mask or mouth to mouth. If the person who has overdosed does not have a pulse, rescuers should begin CPR.

=== Other Treatments ===
Another medication that can be used to treat opioid overdoses is Nalmefene, which is an opioid derivative structurally similar to Naltrexone. It works similarly to Naloxone but has a longer half-life. It is approved for intravenous, intramuscular, and subcutaneous administration by prescription only, unlike the over the counter formulations of naloxone.

== Epidemiology ==
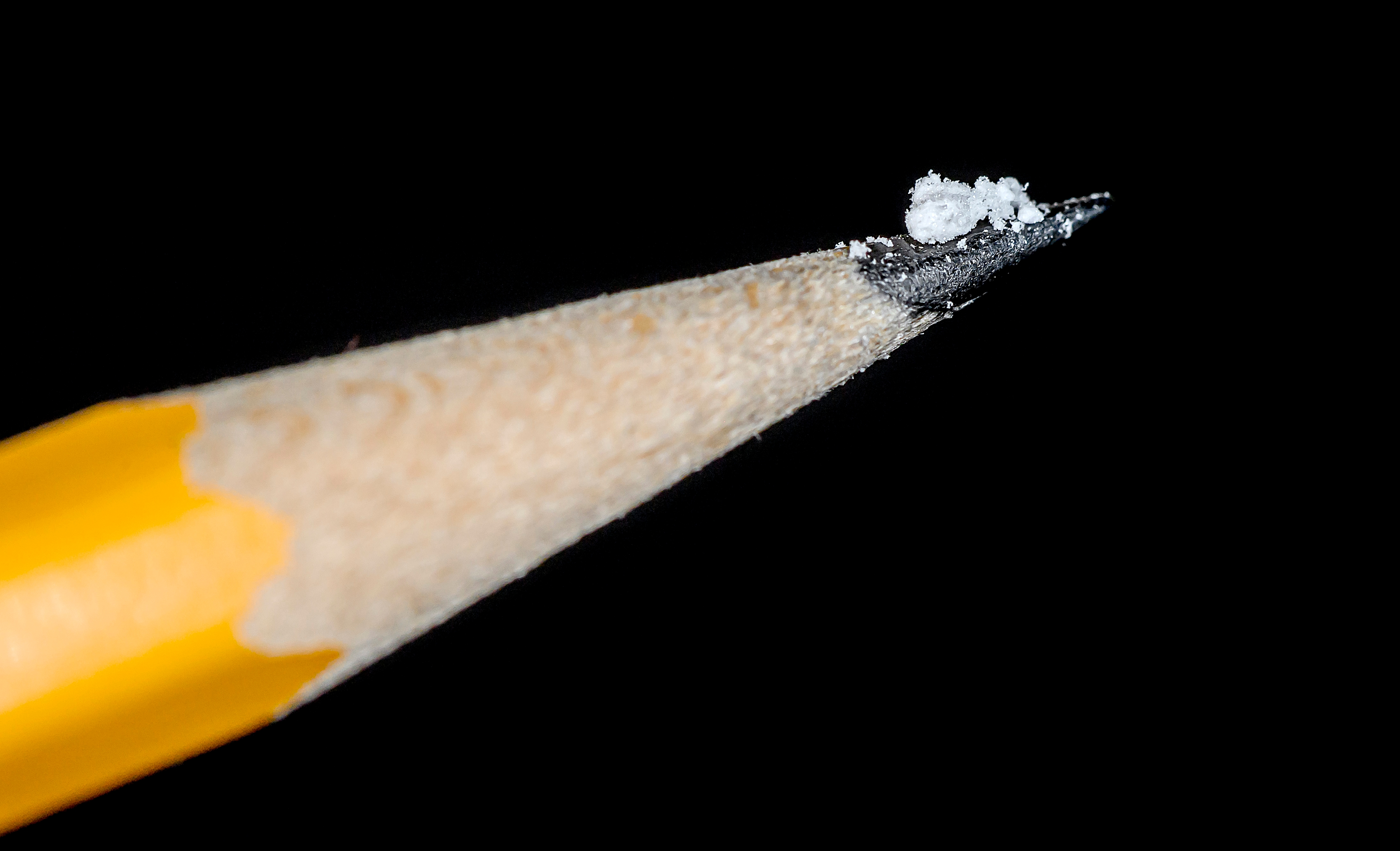
A two milligram dose of fentanyl powder (on pencil tip) is a lethal amount for most people.

In 2016, the World Health Organization estimated that 34 million people used opioids and 19 million used opiates. Of these, about 27 million people had opioid dependence, with the majority—but a decreasing number—using illicit heroin. In 2015, 118,000 people died from opioid use disorders, causing almost one-third of all drug-related deaths.

=== United States ===
Of the 70,200 overdose deaths in the US in 2017, opioids were involved in 47,600, with three male deaths for each female death. This is an increase from 2016 where over 64,000 died from drug overdose, and opioids were involved in over 42,000. In 2017, the five states with the highest rates of death due to drug overdose were West Virginia (57.8 per 100,000), Ohio (46.3 per 100,000), Pennsylvania (44.3 per 100,000), Kentucky (37.2 per 100,000), and New Hampshire (37.0 per 100,000).

Concerning the 2017 data in the charts below, deaths from the various drugs add up to more than 70,200 because multiple substances are involved in many of the deaths. According to the National Safety Council, the lifetime odds of dying from an overdose in the United States is 1 in 96.

In 2023, the most opioid overdose deaths were among Whites (47,754), followed by Blacks (16,481), Latinos (11,310), Native Americans (1,170), and Asians (695).

Drug overdose deaths in the US per 100,000 people by state.

Charts of deaths involving specific opioids and classes of opioids

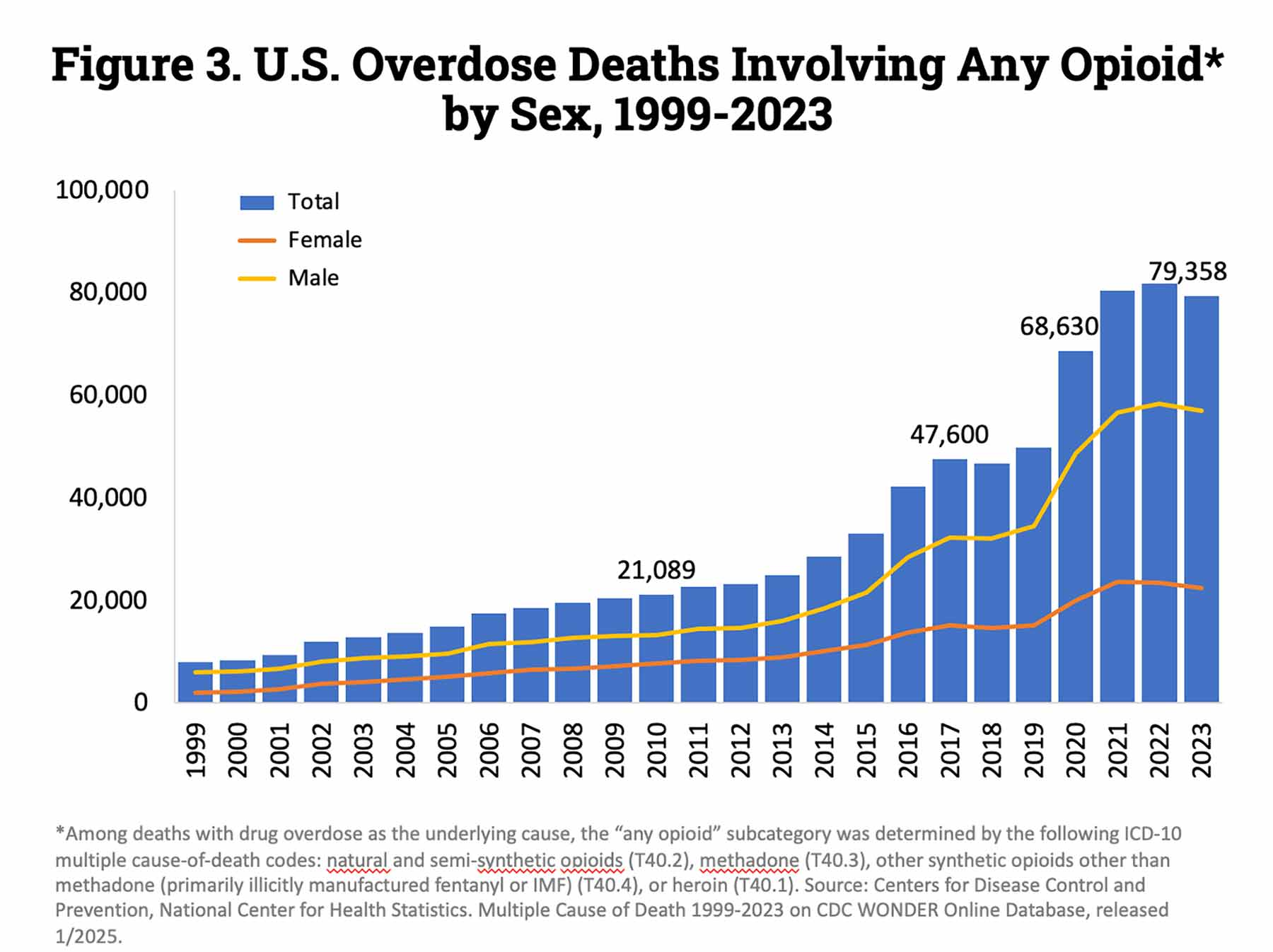
US yearly deaths from all opioid drugs. Included in this number are opioid analgesics, along with heroin and illicit synthetic opioids.

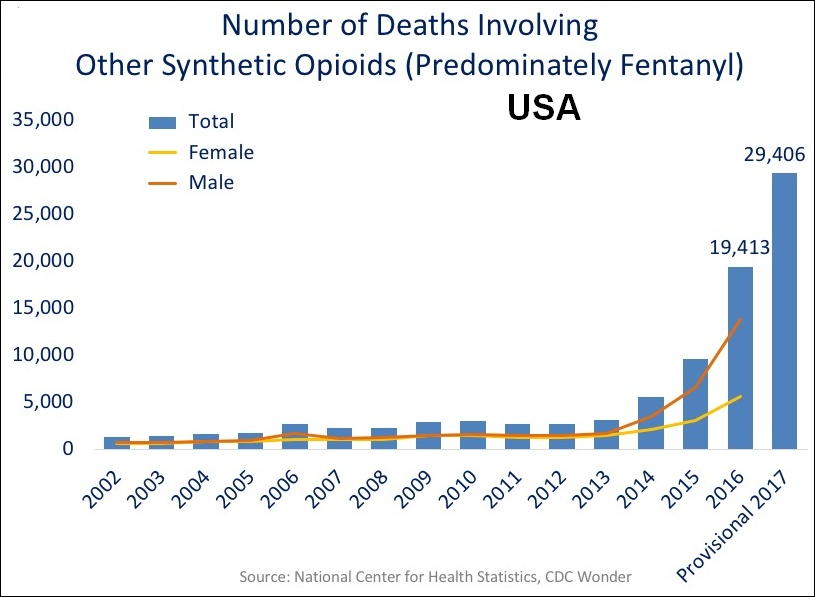
US yearly deaths involving other synthetic opioids, predominately Fentanyl.

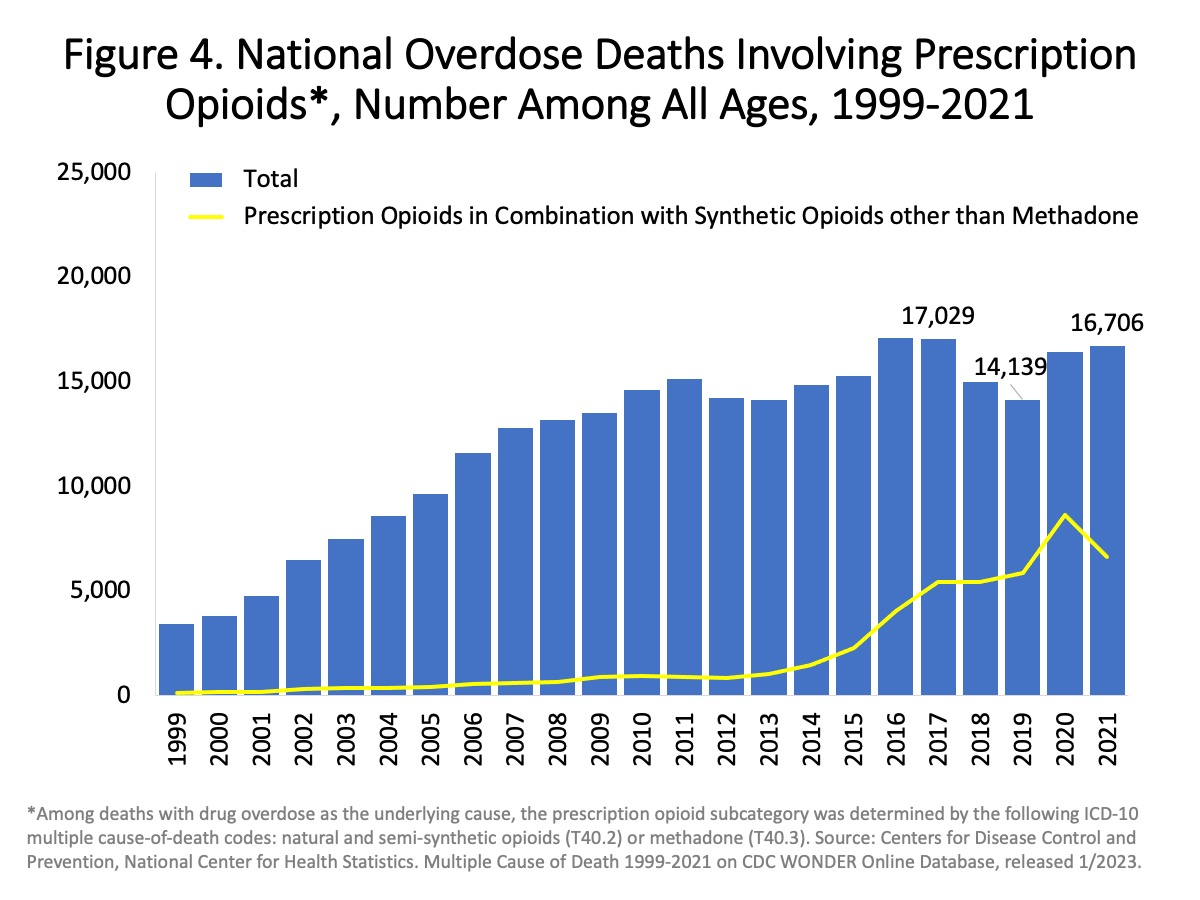
US yearly deaths involving prescription opioids. Non-methadone synthetics is a category dominated by illegally acquired fentanyl, and has been excluded.

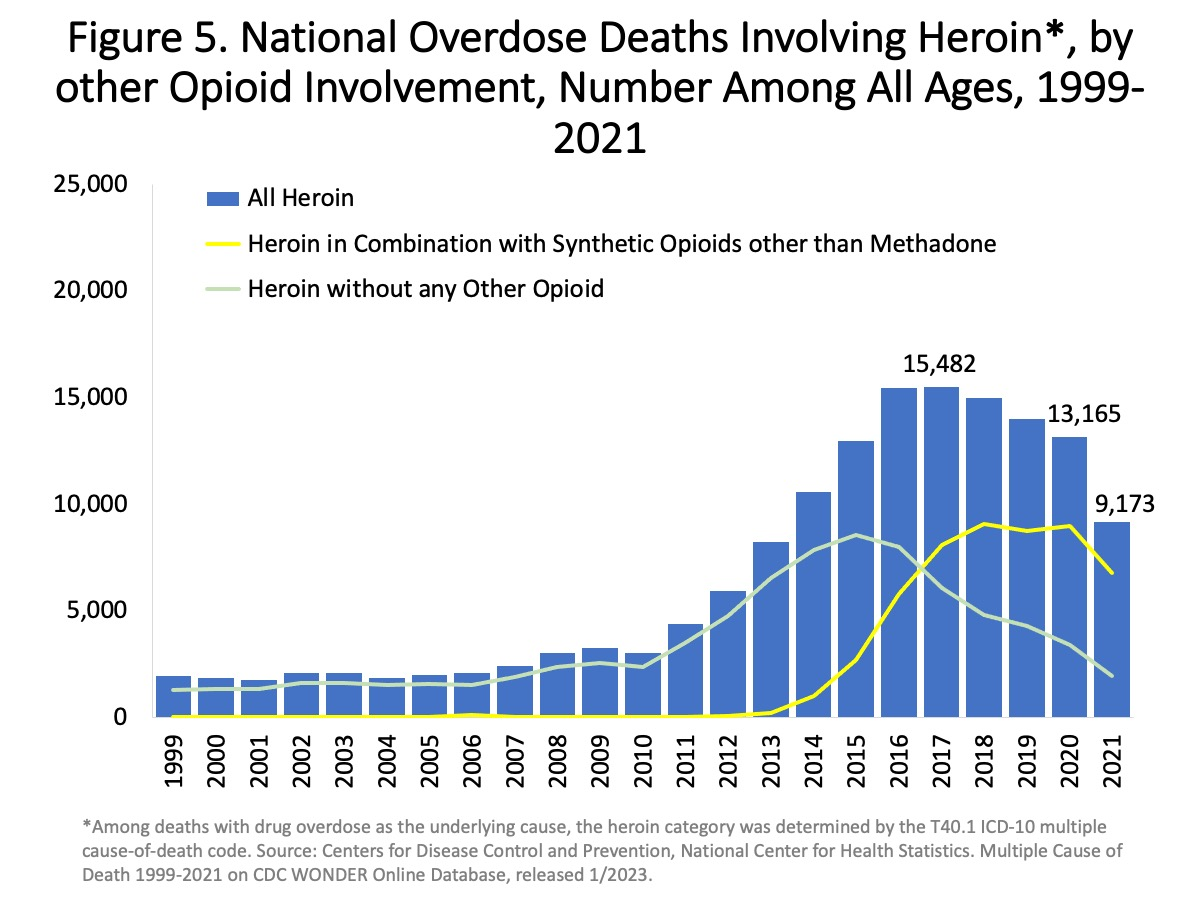
US yearly overdose deaths involving heroin.

== Awareness ==
The Substance Abuse and Mental Health Services Administration hosts an annual health observance known as National Prevention Week. Every third week of May, they encourage communities across the country to unite to share stories about positive mental and behavioral health and the importance of implementing prevention methods. They also sponsor Recovery Month every September. Recovery Month aims to raise awareness about mental and substance use disorders and to honor individuals who recover, promoting the positive message that prevention works and that treatment is effective.

International Overdose Awareness Day is on 31 August to remember those who have died from an overdose, to decrease the stigma of drug-related deaths, and to promote the prevention of overdose.

== See also ==
- Harm reduction
- List of deaths from drug overdose and intoxication
- Responsible drug use
