= Opioid antagonist =

Receptor antagonist that acts on one or more of the opioid receptors

Opioid receptor antagonist
- Drug class

Class identifiers
- Use: Reverse opioid overdose
- ATC code: A06A
- Biological target: Opioid receptors

External links
- MeSH: D009292

Legal status

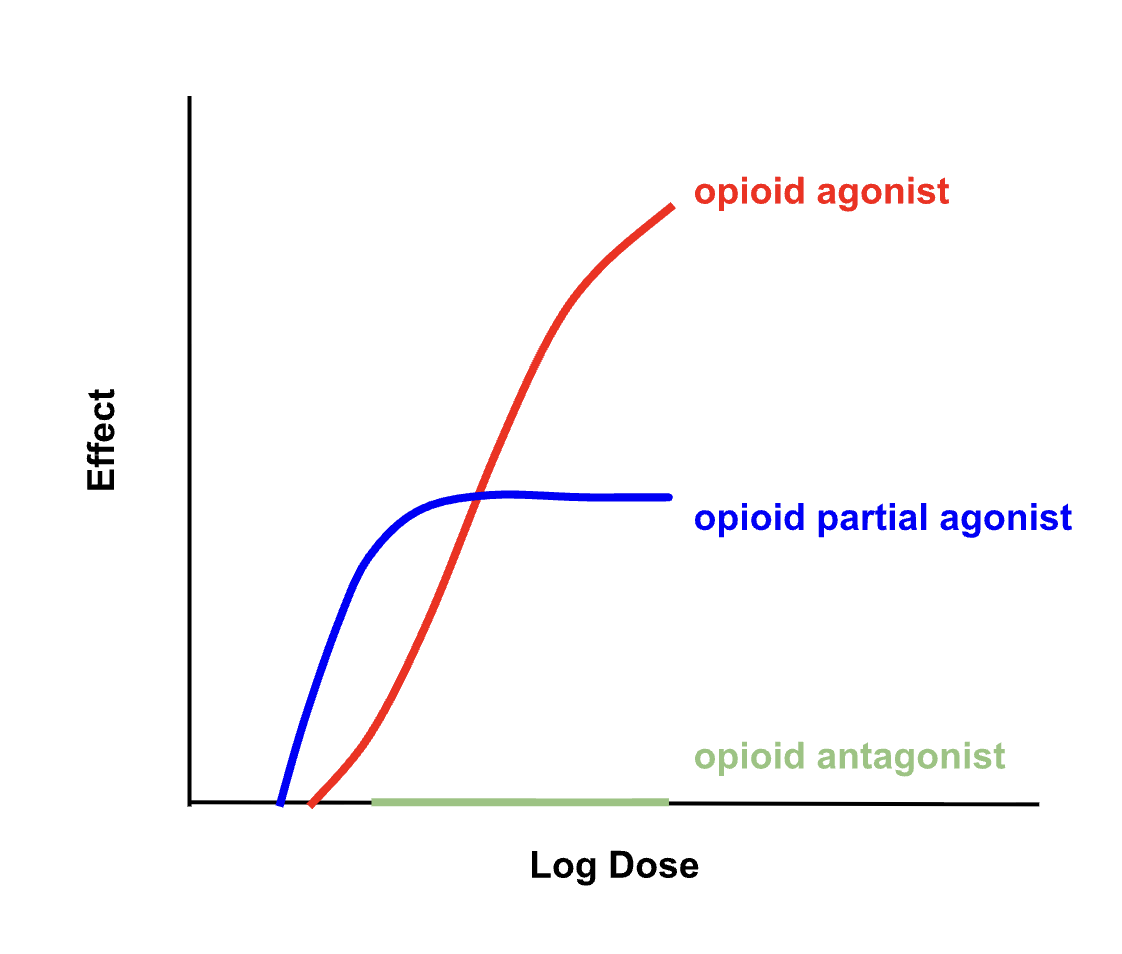
A full agonist will provide a full response, a partial agonist will only provide a partial response, and an antagonist will block the response.

An opioid antagonist, or opioid receptor antagonist, is a receptor antagonist that acts on one or more of the opioid receptors. Opioid antagonists can work on receptors in the peripheral nervous system or central nervous system. They are different from opioid agonists, although they also bind to opioid receptors, often with more affinity than agonists, they either do not activate the receptor, or activate it less than endorphins.

Fentanyl. 2 mg (white powder to the right) is a lethal dose in most people. US penny is 19 mm (0.75 in) wide.

Some opioid antagonists are not pure antagonists because they produce weak opioid partial agonist effects, and can produce analgesic effects when administered in high doses to individuals who have never taken opioids. Examples of such compounds include nalorphine and levallorphan. However, the analgesic effects from these specific drugs are limited and tend to be accompanied by dysphoria, most likely due to additional agonist action at the κ-opioid receptor. As they induce opioid withdrawal effects in people who are taking, or have recently used, opioid full agonists, these drugs are generally considered to be antagonists for practical purposes.

The weak partial agonist effect can be useful for some purposes, and has previously been used for purposes such as long-term maintenance of former opioid addicts using nalorphine, however it can also have disadvantages such as worsening respiratory depression in patients who have overdosed on non-opioid sedatives such as alcohol or barbiturates. On the other hand, Naloxone has no partial agonist effects, and is in fact a partial inverse agonist at μ-opioid receptors, and so is the preferred antidote drug for treating opioid overdose.

Naloxone and naltrexone are commonly used opioid antagonist drugs which are competitive antagonists that bind to the opioid receptors with higher affinity than agonists but do not activate the receptors. This effectively blocks the receptor, preventing the body from responding to opioids and endorphins. Naloxone is a drug used to treat opioid overdose. During an overdose, the most dangerous symptom is respiratory depression. When antagonists such as Naloxone are given, they bind to the opioid receptors more tightly, and prevent agonists from binding. This restores normal respiratory function, allowing time for first responders to reach. This drug comes in many forms and can be administered intravenously, intramuscularly, and intranasally. Naltrexone can be administered as an injection or given orally.

Naltrexone is also a partial inverse agonist, and this property is exploited in treatment of opioid addiction, as a sustained course of low-dose naltrexone can reverse the altered homeostasis which results from long-term abuse of opioid agonist drugs. This is the only treatment available which can reverse the long-term after effects of opioid addiction known as post acute withdrawal syndrome, which otherwise tends to produce symptoms such as depression and anxiety that may lead to eventual relapse. A course of low-dose naltrexone is thus often used as the final step in the treatment of opioid addiction after the patient has been weaned off the substitute agonist such as methadone or buprenorphine, in order to restore homeostasis and minimize the risk of post acute withdrawal syndrome once the maintenance agonist has been withdrawn.

Methylnaltrexone is an opioid antagonist that works in the digestive tract. Another symptom of long-term opioid use is opioid-induced constipation. This drug is an FDA-approved treatment for this constipation, as binding to these peripheral opioid receptors work to make the digestive tract more mobile.

== List of opioid antagonists ==
The following are all μ-opioid receptor (MOR) antagonists or inverse agonists. Many of them also bind to the κ-opioid receptor (KOR) and/or δ-opioid receptor (DOR), where they variously behave as antagonists and/or agonists.

=== Centrally active ===
These drugs are used mainly as antidotes to reverse opioid overdose and in the treatment of alcohol dependence and opioid dependence (by blocking the effects, namely euphoria, of opioids so as to discourage abuse).

==== Marketed ====
- Naloxone
- Naltrexone
- Nalmefene
- Samidorphan

Diprenorphine is used in veterinary medicine only.

==== Discontinued or rarely used ====
- Nalorphine
- Nalorphine dinicotinate
- Levallorphan

==== Never marketed ====
- Nalodeine

=== Peripherally restricted ===
Peripherally acting μ-opioid receptor antagonists are used mainly in the treatment of opioid-induced constipation. These are designed to specifically inhibit certain opioid receptors in the gastrointestinal tract and with limited ability to cross the blood–brain barrier. Therefore, they do not affect the analgesic effects of opioids within the central nervous system.

==== Marketed ====
- Alvimopan
- Methylnaltrexone
- Naloxegol
- Methylnaltrexone
- Naldemedine

==== Under development currently or previously ====
- 6β-Naltrexol
- Axelopran
- Bevenopran
- Methylsamidorphan

=== Miscellaneous ===
Buprenorphine and dezocine are partial agonists of the MOR but antagonists of the KOR. Contrarily, eptazocine is an antagonist of the MOR but an agonist of the KOR; the same is also true for nalorphine and levallorphan. A variety of partial agonists or mixed agonists-antagonists of the MOR and KOR are also marketed, and include butorphanol, levorphanol, nalbuphine, pentazocine, and phenazocine. All of the aforementioned drugs may be described as opioid modulators instead of as pure antagonists. With the sole exception of nalorphine, all of the preceding are used as analgesics (by virtue of the fact that both MOR and KOR agonism independently confer pain relief). However, these opioid analgesics have atypical properties in comparison to the prototypical pure MOR full agonist opioid analgesics, such as less or no risk of respiratory depression for MOR partial agonists and antagonists, reduced or no euphoria, abuse potential, and dependence liability with MOR partial agonists/antagonists, and use- and dose-limiting side effects such as dysphoria and hallucinations with KOR agonists. In addition, by virtue of its KOR antagonism, buprenorphine (as buprenorphine/samidorphan (ALKS-5461) or buprenorphine/naltrexone to block its MOR agonism) is under investigation for the treatment of depression and cocaine dependence, as are other KOR antagonists such as aticaprant and, previously, JDTic and PF-4455242 (both discontinued due to toxicity concerns).

== Selective antagonists ==
All of the centrally active opioid antagonists used widely in medicine are non-selective, either blocking multiple opioid receptors, or blocking the MOR but activating the KOR. However, for scientific research, selective antagonists are needed which can block one of the opioid receptors but without affecting the others. This has led to the development of antagonists which are highly selective to one of the four receptors:

- Cyprodime is a selective MOR antagonist
- Naltrindole is a selective DOR antagonist
- Norbinaltorphimine is a selective KOR antagonist
- J-113,397 is a selective nociceptin receptor (NOP) antagonist

Other selective antagonists are also known, but the four listed above were the first selective antagonists discovered for each respective opioid receptor, and are still the most widely used.

In addition to selective antagonists, AT-076 is a non-selective, balanced antagonist of all four of the opioid receptors, and was the first such agent to be discovered.

== Depersonalization disorder ==
Naloxone and naltrexone have both been studied in the treatment of depersonalization disorder. In a 2001 study with naloxone, three of fourteen patients lost their depersonalization symptoms entirely, and seven showed marked improvement. The findings of a 2005 naltrexone study were slightly less promising, with an average of a 30% reduction of symptoms, as measured by three validated dissociation scales. The more dramatic result of naloxone versus naltrexone is suspected to be due to different opioid receptor affinity/selectivity with naloxone (specifically, more potent KOR blockade), which appears to be better suited to individuals with depersonalization disorder.

== In popular culture ==
- In the episode of House, "Skin Deep", opioid antagonist drugs were administered in order to completely remove the patient's heroin induced addiction/withdrawal symptoms (during an induced coma in order to relieve the extreme pain of their use), so that an accurate diagnosis of paraneoplastic syndrome caused by cancer was differentiated.
- In an episode of Royal Pains, a character dangerously tries to undergo a procedure (and go under anaesthesia) in his own home.
- In an episode of Hannibal, Dr.Lecter administers Naloxone to Jack Crawford's wife after she tries to commit suicide by overdosing on morphine.
