= Buprenorphine/samidorphan =

Combination drug formulation

- Buprenorphine (top) + samidorphan (bottom)

Combination of
- Buprenorphine: Opioid modulator
- Samidorphan: Opioid antagonist

Clinical data
- Other names: ALKS-5461
- Routes of administration: Sublingual

Legal status
- Legal status: US: Investigational New Drug

Identifiers
- CAS Number: 2415438-51-4

Buprenorphine/samidorphan (developmental code name ALKS-5461) is a combination formulation of buprenorphine and samidorphan which was developed as an add on to antidepressants in treatment-resistant depression (TRD). It is a κ-opioid receptor (KOR) antagonist and was being developed by Alkermes.

ALKS-5461 failed to meet its primary efficacy endpoints in two trials from 2016. On the basis of a third study that did meet its primary endpoints, Alkermes initiated a rolling New Drug Application with the FDA.

In November 2018, an FDA panel voted against recommending approval, finding that evidence was insufficient. As such, approval of the medication was rejected in 2019, after which Alkermes soon dropped it from its R&D pipeline.

== Pharmacology ==
=== Pharmacodynamics ===
ALKS-5461 is a (1:1 ratio) combination of: (1) buprenorphine, a weak partial agonist of the μ-opioid receptor (MOR), antagonist/very weak partial agonist of the κ-opioid receptor (KOR), and, to a lesser extent, antagonist of the δ-opioid receptor (DOR) and weak partial agonist of the nociceptin receptor (NOP); and (2) samidorphan, a preferential antagonist of the MOR (but also, to a slightly lesser extent, weak partial agonist of the KOR and DOR). The combination of these two drugs putatively results in what is functionally a blockade of KORs with negligible activation of MORs.

==== κ-Opioid receptor antagonism ====
It has been known since the 1980s that buprenorphine binds to at high affinity and antagonizes the KOR.

Through activation of the KOR, dynorphins, opioid peptides that are the endogenous ligands of the KOR and that can, in many regards, be figuratively thought of as functional inverses of the morphine-like, euphoric and stress-inhibiting endorphins, induce dysphoria and stress-like responses in both animals and humans, as well as psychotomimetic effects in humans, and are thought to be essential for the mediation of the dysphoric aspects of stress. In addition, dynorphins are believed to be critically involved in producing the changes in neuroplasticity evoked by chronic stress that lead to the development of depressive and anxiety disorders, increased drug-seeking behavior, and dysregulation of the hypothalamic-pituitary-adrenal (HPA) axis. In support of this, in knockout mice lacking the genes encoding the KOR and/or prodynorphin (the endogenous precursor of the dynorphins), many of the usual effects of exposure to chronic stress are completely absent, such as increased immobility in the forced swimming test (a widely employed assay of depressive-like behavior) and increased conditioned place preference for cocaine (a measure of the rewarding properties and addictive susceptibility to cocaine). Accordingly, KOR antagonists show robust efficacy in animal models of depression, anxiety, anhedonia, drug addiction, and other stress-related behavioral and physiological abnormalities.

A mouse study found that knockout of the MOR or DOR or selective pharmacological ablation of the NOP did not affect the antidepressant-like effects of buprenorphine, whereas knockout of the KOR abolished the antidepressant-like effects of the drug, supporting the notion that the antidepressant-like effects of buprenorphine are indeed mediated by modulation of the KOR by the drug (and not of the MOR, DOR, or NOP). However, a subsequent study found that the MOR may play an important role in the antidepressant-like effects of buprenorphine in animals.

Buprenorphine is not a silent antagonist of the KOR but rather a weak partial agonist. In vitro, it has shown some activation of the KOR at concentrations of ≥ 100 nM, with an E_{max} of 22% at 30 μM; no plateau in maximal response (EC_{50}) was observed at concentrations up to 30 μM. Samidorphan similarly shows activation of the KOR in vitro, but to an even greater extent, with an EC_{50} of 3.3 nM and an E_{max} of 36%. As such, ALKS-5461 may possess both antagonistic and agonistic potential at the KOR. Because antagonism of the KOR seems to be responsible for the antidepressant effects of ALKS-5461, this property could in theory limit the effectiveness of ALKS-5461 in the treatment of depression.

== History ==
ALKS-5461 was granted Fast Track Designation by the Food and Drug Administration (FDA) for treatment-resistant depression in October 2013. During June and July 2014, three phase III clinical trials were initiated in the United States for treatment-resistant depression. Alkermes reported that the first two trials failed in 2016. In August 2017, based on the third trial, Alkermes announced the initiation of a rolling submission of a New Drug Application for ALKS-5461 to the FDA. On 31 January 2018, Alkermes submitted a New Drug Application for ALKS-5461 to the FDA for the adjunctive treatment of major depressive disorder. The submission was accepted by the FDA on 9 April 2018 after initially serving a refuse-to-file letter due to insufficient evidence of overall effectiveness.

In November 2018, an FDA advisory committee voted 21–2 against recommending approval of ALKS-5461 for MDD, setting the medication up for likely rejection. The main reason cited was insufficient evidence of effectiveness. The panel voted in favor of adequate safety having been demonstrated.

== See also ==
- κ-Opioid receptor § Antagonists
- List of investigational antidepressants
