= 6β-Naltrexol =

Chemical compound

Clinical data
- Other names: 6beta-Naltrexol; 6β-Hydroxynaltrexone; AIKO-150; 17-(Cyclopropylmethyl)-4,5α-epoxymorphinan-3,6α,14-triol
- Drug class: Opioid antagonist

Pharmacokinetic data
- Elimination half-life: 12–18 hours

Identifiers
- IUPAC name: (4R,4aS,7R,7aR,12bS)-3-(cyclopropylmethyl)-1,2,4,5,6,7,7a,13-octahydro-4,12-methanobenzofuro[3,2-e]isoquinoline-4a,7,9-triol
- CAS Number: 49625-89-0
- PubChem CID: 5486554
- ChemSpider: 4588965
- UNII: J0W963M37T
- ChEMBL: ChEMBL140278
- CompTox Dashboard (EPA): DTXSID80197942
- ECHA InfoCard: 100.230.713

Chemical and physical data
- Formula: C_{20}H_{25}NO_{4}
- Molar mass: 343.423 g·mol^{−1}
- 3D model (JSmol): Interactive image
- SMILES: C1C[C@]2([C@H]3CC4=C5[C@@]2(CCN3CC6CC6)[C@H]([C@@H]1O)OC5=C(C=C4)O)O
- InChI: InChI=1S/C20H25NO4/c22-13-4-3-12-9-15-20(24)6-5-14(23)18-19(20,16(12)17(13)25-18)7-8-21(15)10-11-1-2-11/h3-4,11,14-15,18,22-24H,1-2,5-10H2/t14-,15-,18+,19+,20-/m1/s1; Key:JLVNEHKORQFVQJ-PYIJOLGTSA-N

6β-Naltrexol, or 6β-hydroxynaltrexone (developmental code name AIKO-150), is a peripherally-selective opioid receptor antagonist related to naltrexone. It is a major active metabolite of naltrexone formed by hepatic dihydrodiol dehydrogenase enzymes. With naltrexone therapy, 6β-naltrexol is present at approximately 10- to 30-fold higher concentrations than naltrexone at steady state due to extensive first-pass metabolism of naltrexone into 6β-naltrexol. In addition to being an active metabolite of naltrexone, 6β-naltrexol was itself studied for the treatment of opioid-induced constipation. It was found to be effective and well-tolerated, and did not precipitate opioid withdrawal symptoms or interfere with opioid pain relief, but development was not further pursued.

6β-Naltrexol binds to the opioid receptors with affinity (K_{i}) values of 2.12 nM for the μ-opioid receptor (MOR), 7.24 nM for the κ-opioid receptor (KOR), and 213 nM for the δ-opioid receptor (DOR). Hence, 6β-naltrexol shows 3.5-fold selectivity for the MOR over the KOR and 100-fold selectivity for the MOR over the DOR. Relative to naltrexone, 6β-naltrexol has about half the affinity for the MOR. In contrast to naltrexone, 6β-naltrexol is a neutral antagonist of the MOR (as opposed to an inverse agonist) and can antagonize the actions of both agonists and inverse agonists at the receptor.

6β-Naltrexol is said to have very limited capacity to cross the blood–brain barrier. However, 6β-naltrexol is still able to cross into the brain and produce central opioid receptor antagonism at sufficient levels. In animal studies, 6β-naltrexol showed about 10-fold separation in potency between peripheral and central opioid antagonism, whereas naltrexone showed no separation. Because it is a MOR neutral antagonist and hence does not reduce basal MOR signaling, 6β-naltrexol shows much lower potential for producing opioid withdrawal symptoms than naltrexone at doses achieving similar central opioid blockade in animal studies. Due to the very high levels of 6β-naltrexol that occur during naltrexone therapy, 6β-naltrexol may contribute to the central opioid receptor antagonism of naltrexone.

== See also ==
- 6β-Naltrexol-d4
- Methylnaltrexone
