= Low-dose naltrexone =

Off-label, experimental use of the drug

Low-dose naltrexone (LDN) refers to daily naltrexone dosages that are roughly one-tenth or less of the standard opioid addiction treatment dosage. Most published research suggests a daily dosage of 4.5 mg, but this can vary by a few milligrams. LDN has been studied for the treatment of multiple chronic pain conditions, including fibromyalgia, multiple sclerosis, Crohn's disease, long COVID, and complex regional pain syndrome.

Naltrexone is approved by the Food and Drug Administration (FDA) for medication-assisted treatment of alcoholism and opioid use disorder (OUD). Bernard Bihari's initial off-label usage of naltrexone in doses ranging from 1.5 mg to 3 mg as an adjuvant therapy for acquired immune deficiency syndrome (AIDS) in the 1980s led to the introduction of LDN into clinical practice. Due to a lack of large-scale clinical trials and standardized research aimed at determining appropriate indications for LDN, it has remained an off-label option.

== Mechanism of action ==
Naltrexone and its active metabolite, 6-β-naltrexol, are competitive antagonists at μ-opioid, κ-opioid, and, to a lesser extent, δ-opioid receptors. Standard therapeutic doses of naltrexone block these receptors, achieving two main effects: first, they prevent the inhibition of GABA receptors, which normally suppress neuron activity; many recreational drugs inhibit GABA, thereby increasing neuronal activation, and by blocking GABA inhibition, normal GABA activity resumes. Second, naltrexone blocks dopamine release, since many recreational drugs stimulate dopamine as part of the brain's reward system, which generates feelings of pleasure. As naltrexone is a competitive antagonist at the identical sites of action of many opioid agonists, such as morphine, care must be taken to ensure that low-dose naltrexone is not taken near the same time as these medications, as they will not be as efficacious in relieving pain.

== Research ==
Multiple studies have shown that LDN has promise as a treatment for chronic pain, some autoimmune disorders, and cancers. Studies on the efficacy of LDN for multiple sclerosis have been inconclusive. Clinical trials for its use as treatment of fibromyalgia were initiated in 2021. LDN is also being studied in long COVID.

A 2018 therapeutic utilization review concluded that LDN may be an appropriate option for treatment of fibromyalgia and irritable bowel syndrome, but that "proper clinical trials are needed in order to establish evidence that could lead to correct indications, mode of administration, and other aspects necessary for effective clinical pharmacology of [low-dose naltrexone]." The UK's National Health Service echoed this sentiment in 2020.

In a 2013 paper published in Arthritis & Rheumatology, authors Jarred Younger and Sean Mackey reported reduced circulating pro‑inflammatory cytokines and self‑reported pain in fibromyalgia patients using LDN. A 2018 review summarized mixed trial outcomes and emphasized methodological limitations.

A 2023 systematic review published in the Australian Journal of General Practice found that preliminary research into the use of LDN as a treatment for fibromyalgia is promising. All clinical studies examined showed statistically significant improvements in pain and pain tolerance with mild side effects; however, sample sizes were small and the evidence is inconclusive. A 2025 scoping review recommended larger, randomized, placebo-controlled trials with standardized dosing and long‑term follow‑up to establish efficacy and appropriate clinical indications.
