= Dysphoria =

Profound state of unease or dissatisfaction

Dysphoria (from Ancient Greek δύσφορος (dúsphoros) 'grievous'; from δυσ- (dus-) 'bad, difficult' and φέρω (phérō) 'to bear') is a profound state of unease or dissatisfaction. It is the semantic opposite of euphoria. In a psychiatric context, dysphoria may accompany depression, anxiety, or agitation.

== In psychiatry ==
Intense states of distress and unease increase the risk of suicide, as well as being unpleasant in themselves. Relieving dysphoria is therefore a priority of psychiatric treatment. One may treat underlying causes such as depression (especially dysthymia or major depressive disorder) or bipolar disorder as well as the dysphoric symptoms themselves.

=== ICD-11 ===
Dysphoria (MB24.7) was included as a separate diagnosis in the ICD-11, which came into force in 2022. It can be found under the category "Mental or behavioural symptoms, signs or clinical findings". It is defined as follows:

An unpleasant mood state, which can include feelings of depression, anxiety, discontent, irritability, and unhappiness.

== Possible manifestations ==
Dysphoria is a key component of several health conditions that can have an intense negative impact on a person's quality of life.

=== Borderline personality disorder (BPD) ===
Extreme mood swings, chronic feelings of emptiness and rapid irritability are typical. Between intense fear of abandonment and impulsive behaviour, sufferers experience a lasting dysphoria that can manifest itself in outbursts of anger, self-harm or relationship dysfunction.

=== Drug-induced dysphoria (dysphoriants) ===
Some drugs can produce dysphoria, including κ-opioid receptor agonists like salvinorin A (the active constituent of the hallucinogenic plant Salvia divinorum), butorphanol and pentazocine, μ-opioid receptor antagonists such as naltrexone and nalmefene, and antipsychotics like haloperidol and chlorpromazine (via blockade of dopamine receptors), among others. Depressogenic and/or anxiogenic drugs may also be associated with dysphoria.

Intoxication or withdrawal syndromes (e.g. alcohol or opiate withdrawal) often result in severe, persistent dysphoria. Those affected feel restless, irritable and dissatisfied - a main driver for relapses, as short-term relief from further substance intake is expected.

=== Gender dysphoria (GD) ===
Gender dysphoria refers to clinically significant distress caused by the incongruence (mismatch) between the sex assigned at birth and one’s gender identity. Those affected often wish to align their primary and/or secondary sex characteristics with their experienced gender. The DSM-5-TR, published in 2022, uses the term "gender dysphoria" without pathologizing gender incongruence itself.

=== Mixed affective state (dysphoric mania) ===
In bipolar disorders, an episode can occur in which symptoms of mania (e.g. racing thoughts, pressurised speech) and features of dysphoria (e.g. irritability, anger, dissatisfaction) occur simultaneously. The coexistence of high energy and low mood makes this form particularly agonising and risky (increased suicidal tendencies).

=== Organic dysphoria ===
In the context of neurological or internal illnesses (e.g. traumatic brain injury, dementia, metabolic disorders), dysphoria can occur primarily for organic reasons. For example: The damage or dysfunction in certain areas of the brain leads to chronic bad mood and irritability without there being an underlying primary mental illness (Organic brain syndrome).

=== Premenstrual dysphoric disorder (PMDD) ===
Those affected experience pronounced mood swings with irritability, sadness and inner restlessness during the luteal phase (one to two weeks before the onset of menstruation). The symptoms are so severe that they put a significant strain on everyday life and interpersonal relationships.

=== Post-traumatic stress disorder (PTSD) ===
A central feature is the persistent experience of fear, anger, inner restlessness and irritability. These dysphoric states are caused by the re-experiencing of the traumatic event and the associated emotional overexcitement, which severely restricts everyday life.

=== Other related conditions ===
The following conditions may also include dysphoria as a symptom:

- Major depressive disorder (unipolar) and dysthymia
- Bipolar disorder and cyclothymia
- Premenstrual syndrome
- Dysphoric milk ejection reflex
- Stress
- Adjustment disorder with depressed mood
- Anxiety disorders
- Dysphoric rumination
- Dissociative disorders such as dissociative identity disorder, dissociative amnesia and depersonalization-derealization disorder.
- Attention deficit hyperactivity disorder
- Mixed anxiety-depressive disorder
- Personality disorders such as dependent personality disorder, histrionic personality disorder, and antisocial personality disorder
- Body dysmorphic disorder
- Akathisia
- Schizophrenia
- Sexual dysfunction
- Body integrity dysphoria
- Insomnia
- Chronic pain
- Disease
