= Alvimopan =

Chemical compound

Clinical data
- Trade names: Entereg
- Other names: Alvimopan, Entereg
- AHFS/Drugs.com: Monograph
- MedlinePlus: a608051
- License data: US FDA: Alvimopan
- Routes of administration: Oral
- ATC code: A06AH02 (WHO)

Legal status
- Legal status: US: ℞-only

Pharmacokinetic data
- Bioavailability: 6%
- Protein binding: 80% (parent drug), 94% (metabolite)
- Metabolism: Gut microflora-mediated hydrolysis to active metabolite
- Elimination half-life: 10-17 hours
- Excretion: Faeces, urine (35%)

Identifiers
- IUPAC name: 2-([(2S)-2-([(3R,4R)-4-(3-hydroxyphenyl)-3,4-dimethylpiperidin-1-yl]methyl) -3-phenylpropanoyl]amino)acetic acid
- CAS Number: 156053-89-3
- PubChem CID: 5488548
- IUPHAR/BPS: 7471
- DrugBank: DB06274
- ChemSpider: 4589864
- UNII: Q153V49P3Z
- ChEMBL: ChEMBL270190
- CompTox Dashboard (EPA): DTXSID60166035

Chemical and physical data
- Formula: C_{25}H_{32}N_{2}O_{4}
- Molar mass: 424.541 g·mol^{−1}
- 3D model (JSmol): Interactive image
- SMILES: O=C(O)CNC(=O)[C@@H](Cc1ccccc1)CN3CC[C@@](c2cccc(O)c2)([C@H](C3)C)C
- InChI: InChI=1S/C25H32N2O4/c1-18-16-27(12-11-25(18,2)21-9-6-10-22(28)14-21)17-20(24(31)26-15-23(29)30)13-19-7-4-3-5-8-19/h3-10,14,18,20,28H,11-13,15-17H2,1-2H3,(H,26,31)(H,29,30)/t18-,20-,25+/m0/s1; Key:UPNUIXSCZBYVBB-JVFUWBCBSA-N

Alvimopan (trade name Entereg) is a drug which behaves as a peripherally acting μ-opioid receptor antagonist. With the limited ability to cross the blood–brain barrier and reach the μ-opioid receptors of the central nervous system, the clinically undesirable effects of centrally acting opioid antagonists (like reversal of opioid-mediated analgesia) are avoided without affecting the intended blockade of μ-opioid receptors in the gastrointestinal tract. It is currently only Food and Drug Administration approved for the treatment of postoperative ileus which it received in May 2008.

== Medical uses ==
Alvimopan is indicated in people to avoid postoperative ileus following partial large or small bowel resection with primary anastomosis. Alvimopan accelerates the gastrointestinal recovery period as defined by time to first bowel movement or flatus.

== Adverse effects ==
There is a potential risk of myocardial infarction in patients using alvimopan long-term.

The most common side effects associated with alvimopan are:

Adverse Effect	Frequency (%) with placebo	Frequency (%) with alvimopan
Dyspepsia	4.6	7.0
Hypokalemia	8.5	9.5
Back Pain	1.7	3.3
Delayed Micturition	2.1	3.2

== Contraindications ==
Alvimopan is absolutely contraindicated in patients who have taken therapeutic doses of opioids for more than seven consecutive days immediately prior to when alvimopan would be initiated because individuals with recent exposure to opioids are expected to be more sensitive to the effects of μ-opioid receptor antagonists. The peripheral site of action of alvimopan suggests that such a heightened sensitivity would precipitate gastrointestinal effects beyond dyspepsia.

== Interactions ==
Alvimopan is not a substrate for the cytochrome P450 enzyme system. Therefore, no interactions are expected with hepatically metabolized drugs. Alvimopan is substrate for P-glycoprotein. Thus, interactions are to be expected with known P-glycoprotein inhibitors such as amiodarone, bepridil, diltiazem, ciclosporin, itraconazole, quinine, quinidine, spironolactone, and verapamil.

== Pharmacology ==
=== Mechanism of action ===
Alvimopan is a competitive antagonist of the μ-opioid receptors (MOR) in the gastrointestinal tract, with a Ki of 0.2 ng/mL. Activation of these receptors by endogenous or exogenous agonists reduces gastrointestinal motility, and alvimopan blocks this effect. Like most other peripherally-selective MOR antagonists, such as naloxegol and methylnaltrexone, alvimopan is selective for peripheral receptors because it is effluxed by P-glycoprotein, which reduces its ability to cross the blood-brain barrier and affect the central nervous system.

=== Pharmacokinetics ===
==== Absorption ====
Peak plasma concentration (C_{max}) of alvimopan is reached approximately 2 hours after oral dosing, while the C_{max} for metabolite occurs 36 hours after an oral dose. Alvimopan's high affinity for the peripheral μ-receptor results in an absolute bioavailability less than 7%.

==== Distribution ====
80% to 90% of systemically available alvimopan is bound to plasma protein. At steady state, the volume of distribution is approximately 30 liters.

==== Metabolism ====
Alvimopan undergoes no significant hepatic metabolism, but is metabolized by intestinal flora. Gut metabolism produces an active metabolite with no clinically significant contribution to drug effect.

==== Elimination ====
Alvimopan undergoes 35% renal excretion and greater than 50% biliary excretion. Drug metabolized by intestinal flora is excreted in the feces. Alvimopan's half-life of elimination is 10 to 17 hours, while that of the gut metabolite is 10 to 18 hours.

== Dosing and administration ==
Alvimopan is required by the FDA to participate in Risk Evaluation and Mitigation Strategy (REMS) to ensure safe use. Alvimopan is only approved for short term use of no more than 15 doses. It is available on an inpatient basis at institutions approved by and registered with the Entereg Access Support and Education (E.A.S.E.) program. A person should receive no more than 15 doses.

== See also ==
- Axelopran
- Bevenopran
- LY-88329
- Methylnaltrexone
- Naldemedine
- Naloxegol
