= Bevenopran =

Chemical compound

Legal status
- Legal status: Investigational

Identifiers
- IUPAC name: 5-[2-Methoxy-4-[[2-(oxan-4-yl)ethylamino]methyl]phenoxy]pyrazine-2-carboxamide
- CAS Number: 676500-67-7
- PubChem CID: 10452732
- ChemSpider: 8628148
- UNII: IC58Q2EHPJ
- KEGG: D10349
- CompTox Dashboard (EPA): DTXSID90217963

Chemical and physical data
- Formula: C_{20}H_{26}N_{4}O_{4}
- Molar mass: 386.452 g·mol^{−1}
- 3D model (JSmol): Interactive image
- SMILES: COC1=C(C=CC(=C1)CNCCC2CCOCC2)OC3=NC=C(N=C3)C(=O)N
- InChI: InChI=1S/C20H26N4O4/c1-26-18-10-15(11-22-7-4-14-5-8-27-9-6-14)2-3-17(18)28-19-13-23-16(12-24-19)20(21)25/h2-3,10,12-14,22H,4-9,11H2,1H3,(H2,21,25); Key:ZGCYVRNZWGUXNQ-UHFFFAOYSA-N

Bevenopran (INN, USAN) (former developmental code names CB-5945, ADL-5945, MK-2402, OpRA III) is a peripherally acting μ-opioid receptor antagonist that also acts on δ-opioid receptors and was under development by Cubist Pharmaceuticals for the treatment of chronic opioid-induced constipation. It reached phase III clinical trials for this indication before being discontinued.

== See also ==
- Alvimopan
- Axelopran
- Eluxadoline
- Methylnaltrexone
- Naldemedine
- Naloxegol
