= Tegileridine =

Chemical compound

Clinical data
- Trade names: 艾苏特 (Aisute, AiSuTe)
- Other names: AiSuTe; SHR-8554; SHR8554
- Drug class: μ-Opioid receptor agonist; Opioid; Analgesic

Legal status
- Legal status: Rx in China

Identifiers
- IUPAC name: (1S,4S)-4-Ethoxy-N-[2-[(9R)-9-pyridin-2-yl-6-oxaspiro[4.5]decan-9-yl]ethyl]-1,2,3,4-tetrahydronaphthalen-1-amine
- CAS Number: 2095345-66-5
- PubChem CID: 129049969
- UNII: YFJS8L4TGU

Chemical and physical data
- Formula: C_{28}H_{38}N_{2}O_{2}
- Molar mass: 434.624 g·mol^{−1}
- 3D model (JSmol): Interactive image
- SMILES: CCO[C@H]1CC[C@@H](C2=CC=CC=C12)NCC[C@]3(CCOC4(C3)CCCC4)C5=CC=CC=N5
- InChI: InChI=1S/C28H38N2O2/c1-2-31-25-13-12-24(22-9-3-4-10-23(22)25)29-19-16-27(26-11-5-8-18-30-26)17-20-32-28(21-27)14-6-7-15-28/h3-5,8-11,18,24-25,29H,2,6-7,12-17,19-21H2,1H3/t24-,25-,27+/m0/s1; Key:YUMLNLMFBWBKSK-OHSXHVKISA-N

Tegileridine, sold under the brand name Aisute, is a drug which acts as a μ-opioid receptor agonist. It is closely related to compounds such as oliceridine, TRV734, and SHR9352, and shares a similar profile as a biased agonist selective for activation of the G protein signalling pathway over β-arrestin2 recruitment.

In January 2024, tegileridine was approved in China under the brand name Aisute for the treatment of moderate to severe pain after abdominal surgery.

== See also ==
- μ-Opioid receptor § Biased agonists
