= Methoclocinnamox =

Chemical compound

Clinical data
- Other names: MCCAM; MC-CAM; NIH-10420; O-Methylclocinnamox

Identifiers
- IUPAC name: (E)-N-[(4R,4aS,7aR,12bR)-3-(cyclopropylmethyl)-9-methoxy-7-oxo-2,4,5,6,7a,13-hexahydro-1H-4,12-methanobenzofuro[3,2-e]isoquinolin-4a-yl]-3-(4-chlorophenyl)prop-2-enamide or (2E)-3-(4-chlorophenyl)-N-[(5α)-17-(cyclopropylmethyl)-3-methoxy-6-oxo-4,5-epoxymorphinan-14-yl]acrylamide
- PubChem CID: 44417373
- ChemSpider: 23276873
- ChEMBL: ChEMBL386272

Chemical and physical data
- Formula: C_{30}H_{31}ClN_{2}O_{4}
- Molar mass: 519.04 g·mol^{−1}
- 3D model (JSmol): Interactive image
- SMILES: COC1=C2C3=C(C[C@@H]4[C@]5([C@]3(CCN4CC6CC6)[C@@H](O2)C(=O)CC5)NC(=O)/C=C/C7=CC=C(C=C7)Cl)C=C1
- InChI: InChI=1S/C30H31ClN2O4/c1-36-23-10-7-20-16-24-30(32-25(35)11-6-18-4-8-21(31)9-5-18)13-12-22(34)28-29(30,26(20)27(23)37-28)14-15-33(24)17-19-2-3-19/h4-11,19,24,28H,2-3,12-17H2,1H3,(H,32,35)/b11-6+/t24-,28+,29+,30-/m1/s1; Key:LZSMGMMAKBCSRL-WDJVXPEUSA-N

Methoclocinnamox (MCCAM; developmental code name NIH-10420) is a selective pseudo-irreversible partial agonist of the μ-opioid receptor (MOR). It shows a mixture of opioid agonist- and antagonist-like effects. The drug has long-lasting effects and is insurmountable by other MOR ligands.

MCCAM was derived from clocinnamox (CCAM), was first described by 1995, and was of interest in the potential treatment of opioid dependence. However, it was not further developed and was never marketed. A close analogue of MCCAM, methocinnamox (MCAM), which in contrast to MCCAM acts as a MOR pseudo-irreversible antagonist, was first described in 2000 and is under development for the treatment of opioid use disorder and opioid overdose as of 2023.

== Pharmacology ==
=== Pharmacodynamics ===
MCCAM acts as a selective pseudo-irreversible partial agonist of the μ-opioid receptor (MOR). It shows both opioid agonist- and antagonist-like effects in animals. More specifically, it has analgesic effects, mixed reinforcing effects, appears to lack significant respiratory depression, alleviates opioid withdrawal symptoms, and provides long-lasting blockade and protection against the effects of MOR full agonists (including their reinforcing effects as well as their toxic and lethal effects, for instance in overdose). Due to its pseudo-irreversible nature, MCCAM is insurmountable by conventional reversible MOR ligands, for instance morphine, alfentanil, and naltrexone. MCCAM is buprenorphine-like in many regards, but differs from buprenorphine in its pseudo-irreversibility.

=== Pharmacokinetics ===
MCCAM is known to be partially metabolically converted into clocinnamox (CCAM), a MOR pseudo-irreversible antagonist. In monkeys, with oral administration of MCCAM, 70 to 80% of the drug is eliminated as conjugated CCAM, whereas with subcutaneous injection, up to 70% of the drug is excreted unchanged. As such, the metabolism of MCCAM, and by extension its effects, differ by route of administration. The metabolism of MCCAM also shows species differences between rodents and monkeys.

== Chemistry ==
MCCAM, also known as O-methylclocinnamox, is structurally related to the MOR irreversible antagonists clocinnamox (CCAM) and methocinnamox (MCAM). CCAM and its analogues were derived by structural modification of buprenorphine.

== History ==
Clocinnamox (CCAM) was first described in the scientific literature by 1992. MCCAM was first described by 1995. It was developed by researchers at the National Institute on Drug Abuse (NIDA) of the United States National Institutes of Health (NIH). The drug was of interest in the possible treatment of opioid dependence. However, it was never marketed. Methocinnamox (MCAM), a close analogue of MCCAM, was first described in 2000. MCAM was under development for the treatment of opioid dependence and opioid overdose by 2020.
