= Β-Naltrexamine =

Opioid receptor antagonist

β-Naltexamine

Clinical data
- Other names: β-Naltrexamine; 6β-Aminonaltrexol; 6β-Amino-17-(cyclopropylmethyl)-4,5α-epoxymorphinan-3,14-diol

Identifiers
- IUPAC name: (4R,4aS,7R,7aR,12bS)-7-amino-3-(cyclopropylmethyl)-1,2,4,5,6,7,7a,13-octahydro-4,12-methanobenzofuro[3,2-e]isoquinoline-4a,9-diol
- CAS Number: 67025-97-2
- PubChem CID: 5486948
- ChemSpider: 4589147
- ChEMBL: ChEMBL3303188
- CompTox Dashboard (EPA): DTXSID20217239

Chemical and physical data
- Formula: C_{20}H_{26}N_{2}O_{3}
- Molar mass: 342.439 g·mol^{−1}
- 3D model (JSmol): Interactive image
- SMILES: C1C[C@]2([C@H]3CC4=C5[C@@]2(CCN3CC6CC6)[C@H]([C@@H]1N)OC5=C(C=C4)O)O
- InChI: InChI=1S/C20H26N2O3/c21-13-5-6-20(24)15-9-12-3-4-14(23)17-16(12)19(20,18(13)25-17)7-8-22(15)10-11-1-2-11/h3-4,11,13,15,18,23-24H,1-2,5-10,21H2/t13-,15-,18+,19+,20-/m1/s1; Key:SPPAUICKSNQRNC-GNUVVZJLSA-N

β-Naltrexamine, or 6β-naltrexamine, is an opioid receptor antagonist related to naltrexol and naltrexone. It has served as a parent pharmacophore for irreversible antagonists of the μ-opioid receptor (MOR) such as β-chlornaltrexamine (β-CNA) and β-funaltrexamine (β-FNA). Naltrexamine itself is a neutral antagonist of the MOR and the δ-opioid receptor (DOR) with similarly high affinity for both receptors.
