= Β-Fuoxymorphamine =

β-Fuoxymorphamine

Names
- IUPAC name Methyl (2E)-4-{[(5α,6β)-3,14-dihydroxy-17-methyl-4,5-epoxymorphinan-6-yl]amino}-4-oxo-2-butenoate

Identifiers
CAS Number	72782-06-0
3D model (JSmol)	Interactive image
Abbreviations	β-FOA
ChEMBL	ChEMBL413090
ChemSpider	8915841
PubChem CID	44276202
CompTox Dashboard (EPA)	DTXSID301336209
- InChI: InChI=1S/C22H26N2O6/c1-24-10-9-21-18-12-3-4-14(25)19(18)30-20(21)13(7-8-22(21,28)15(24)11-12)23-16(26)5-6-17(27)29-2/h3-6,13,15,20,25,28H,7-11H2,1-2H3,(H,23,26)/b6-5+/t13-,15-,20+,21+,22-/m1/s1 Key: VYGVQURMYFVOPO-IRYZUVSXSA-N
- SMILES: O[C@]12[C@@]34C=5C(O[C@]3([C@H](NC(/C=C/C(OC)=O)=O)CC1)[H])=C(O)C=CC5C[C@]2(N(C)CC4)[H]

Properties
Chemical formula	C_{22}H_{26}N_{2}O_{6}
Molar mass	414.458 g·mol^{−1}
- Except where otherwise noted, data are given for materials in their standard state (at 25 °C [77 °F], 100 kPa). Infobox references

β-Fuoxymorphamine is an opioid acting at μ-opioid receptors. It is used experimentally.

== See also ==
- β-Funaltrexamine
