= C22H30N2O2S =

The molecular formula C_{22}H_{30}N_{2}O_{2}S (molar mass: 386.551 g/mol, exact mass: 386.2028 u) may refer to:

- Oliceridine
- Sufentanil
