= TRV250 =

Clinical data
- Other names: TRV-250
- Routes of administration: Oral
- Drug class: δ-Opioid receptor agonist; Analgesic; Antimigraine agent

Pharmacokinetic data
- Bioavailability: 14–19% (relative to s.c.)
- Elimination half-life: 2.4–3.8 hours

TRV250 is a δ-opioid receptor (DOR) agonist which is under development for the treatment of migraine. It is taken orally. The drug shows high selectivity for the DOR over the μ- and κ-opioid receptors. It is a biased agonist of the DOR, with preference for activation of G protein signaling over β-arrestin2 signaling. TRV250 produces analgesic, antimigraine-like, antidepressant-like, and anxiolytic-like effects in rodents. In addition, it has dramatically reduced proconvulsant activity relative to non-biased DOR agonists in rodents and monkeys, with a 50- to 80-fold margin between analgesia and seizures. TRV250 is being developed by Trevena. As of April 2025, the drug is in phase 2 clinical trials for treatment of migraine. No recent development has been reported for treatment of CNS disorders, while development for treatment of neuropathic pain and Parkinson's disease was discontinued. TRV250 was first described in the scientific literature in 2015.

== See also ==
- List of investigational headache and migraine drugs
