= C22H28FN3O =

The molecular formula C_{22}H_{28}FN_{3}O (molar mass: 369.484 g/mol) may refer to:

- FP-LAD
- TRV734
