= Methocinnamox =

Opioid antagonist

Clinical data
- Other names: MCAM; M-CAM
- Routes of administration: Intravenous, subcutaneous injection
- Drug class: Opioid receptor antagonist

Identifiers
- IUPAC name: (E)-N-[(4R,4aS,7aR,12bR)-3-(Cyclopropylmethyl)-9-hydroxy-7-oxo-2,4,5,6,7a,13-hexahydro-1H-4,12-methanobenzofuro[3,2-e]isoquinolin-4a-yl]-3-(4-methylphenyl)prop-2-enamide
- CAS Number: 117339-76-1
- PubChem CID: 46877713
- ChemSpider: 24673142
- UNII: NNK2D3EB67
- ChEMBL: ChEMBL610884

Chemical and physical data
- Formula: C_{30}H_{32}N_{2}O_{4}
- Molar mass: 484.596 g·mol^{−1}
- 3D model (JSmol): Interactive image
- SMILES: CC1=CC=C(C=C1)/C=C/C(=O)N[C@@]23CCC(=O)[C@H]4[C@@]25CCN([C@@H]3CC6=C5C(=C(C=C6)O)O4)CC7CC7
- InChI: InChI=1S/C30H32N2O4/c1-18-2-4-19(5-3-18)8-11-25(35)31-30-13-12-23(34)28-29(30)14-15-32(17-20-6-7-20)24(30)16-21-9-10-22(33)27(36-28)26(21)29/h2-5,8-11,20,24,28,33H,6-7,12-17H2,1H3,(H,31,35)/b11-8+/t24-,28+,29+,30-/m1/s1; Key:PJOHVEQSYPOERL-SHEAVXILSA-N

Methocinnamox (MCAM) is an opioid receptor antagonist. It is a pseudo-irreversible non-competitive antagonist of the μ-opioid receptor and a competitive antagonist of the κ- and δ-opioid receptors. The drug has a very long duration of action of up to months with a single dose due to its pseudo-irreversibility. It is administered in animals by intravenous or subcutaneous injection.

It was first described in the scientific literature in 2000. It has not been studied in humans as of 2022. There is interest in methocinnamox in the potential treatment of opioid use disorder and opioid overdose due to its much longer-lasting and insurmountable effects relative to other opioid antagonists like naloxone and naltrexone. Clinical trials of the drug are expected.

Methocinnamox should not be confused with methoclocinnamox (MCCAM), which is a closely related but structurally different compound (chlorine instead of methyl on one of the benzene rings). The drug was derived via structural modification of buprenorphine.

== Pharmacology ==
=== Pharmacodynamics ===
Methocinnamox is an opioid receptor antagonist, it works at the μ-opioid receptor. By acting as an antagonist, it binds to the receptor but does not activate it, thus blocking the action of agonists such as heroin and fentanyl. It is a pseudo-irreversible non-competitive antagonist of the μ-opioid receptor and a competitive antagonist of the κ- and δ-opioid receptors.

Methocinnamox has affinity values for the opioid receptors of 0.6 nM for the μ-opioid receptor, 2.2 nM for the δ-opioid receptor, and 4.9 nM for the κ-opioid receptor. Hence, it has about 3.7-fold preferential affinity for the μ-opioid receptor over the δ-opioid receptor and about 8.2-fold higher affinity for the μ-opioid receptor over the κ-opioid receptor.

The antagonism of the μ-opioid receptor by methocinnamox is not irreversible as the drug does not form a covalent bond with the receptor. This is in contrast to prototypical μ-opioid receptor alkylating agents like β-funaltrexamine and β-chlornaltrexamine. However, in spite of its lack of covalent binding to the μ-opioid receptor, methocinnamox appears to not dissociate from the μ-opioid receptor or dissociates from it extremely slowly. Hence, methocinnamox has been described as a pseudo-irreversible antagonist of the μ-opioid receptor or as a "functionally irreversible" antagonist. The mechanism underlying the pseudo-irreversible antagonism of methocinnamox hasn't been fully elucidated. Also unlike irreversible μ-opioid receptor antagonists like β-funaltrexamine and β-chlornaltrexamine, methocinnamox lacks κ-opioid receptor agonism and is more selective for the μ-opioid receptor in its actions.

Methocinnamox has been found to bind to two distinct sites on the μ-opioid receptor. It binds to the orthosteric site as a pseudo-irreversible and non-competitive antagonist, thereby directly blocking opioid binding. In addition, methocinnamox has been found to bind to and act as an antagonist of an unknown allosteric site on the μ-opioid receptor with lower affinity that modulates the affinity and/or intrinsic activity of orthosteric μ-opioid receptor agonists.

The μ-opioid receptor antagonism of methocinnamox is non-competitive and insurmountable by μ-opioid receptor agonists like morphine and fentanyl. It has been found to completely block the effects of morphine at morphine doses of up to 1,000 mg/kg in animals, with the dose–response curve of morphine being shifted rightward by up to 100-fold. Doses of morphine of 1,000 mg/kg are normally often fatal. The insurmountability of methocinnamox's μ-opioid receptor antagonism is in contrast to that with competitive μ-opioid receptor antagonists like naloxone and naltrexone, which can be overcome with higher doses of μ-opioid receptor agonists.

In contrast to the μ-opioid receptor, the antagonism of the κ- and δ-opioid receptors by methocinnamox is competitive and reversible. Moreover, methocinnamox shows a short duration in the body. The actions of methocinnamox in vivo are selective for μ-opioid receptor antagonism, with a lack of significant antagonism of the effects of κ-opioid receptor agonists like bremazocine or δ-opioid receptor agonists like BW373U86.

The actions of methocinnamox are dose-dependent. A single dose of 3.2 mg/kg blocked the effects of morphine for approximately 2 weeks in animals whereas a single 10 mg/kg dose blocked the effects of morphine for over 2 months.

=== Pharmacokinetics ===
In animals, methocinnamox reached peak concentrations 15 to 45 minutes following injection and had an elimination half-life of approximately 70 minutes. In spite of this short duration in the body however, the μ-opioid receptor antagonist effects of methocinnamox persist for up to months with a single injection. These findings suggest that the long-lasting effects of methocinnamox are not due to pharmacokinetic factors but rather its pharmacodynamic properties and pseudo-irreversible antagonism.

== Chemistry ==
In terms of chemical structure, methocinnamox is a cinnamoylamidomorphinan and is closely related to clocinnamox and methoclocinnamox. It was derived via structural modification of buprenorphine.

== History ==
Clocinnamox was first described in the scientific literature by 1992. Methoclocinnamox, which is metabolically converted into clocinnamox and is a μ-opioid receptor partial agonist, was first described by 1995. Methocinnamox was first described in 2000.

== Research ==
=== Opioid overdose and/or opioid use disorder ===
Methocinnamox is able to reverse the respiratory depressant effects of fentanyl and heroin in animals. However, unlike naloxone, another opioid antagonist, its action lasts around 2 weeks if administered subcutaneously and up to 5 days if administered intravenously. This could make it a better antidote than naloxone in opioid overdoses, because naloxone usually lasts around 30 minutes, there is a need for repeated administration and a danger of renarcotization. By acting longer, methocinnamox prevents these dangers.

Methocinnamox has not yet been tested in humans as of 2022. However, it has been tested in rodents and monkeys. It was reported in March 2020 that clinical trials of methocinnamox were expected to begin within 18 to 24 months. In March 2023, it was reported that a phase 1 clinical trial of methocinnamox funded by the National Institutes of Health (NIH) would possibly start in 2024.

== See also ==
- 14-Cinnamoyloxycodeinone
- Fourphit
- SR-17018
