= Chloroxymorphamine =

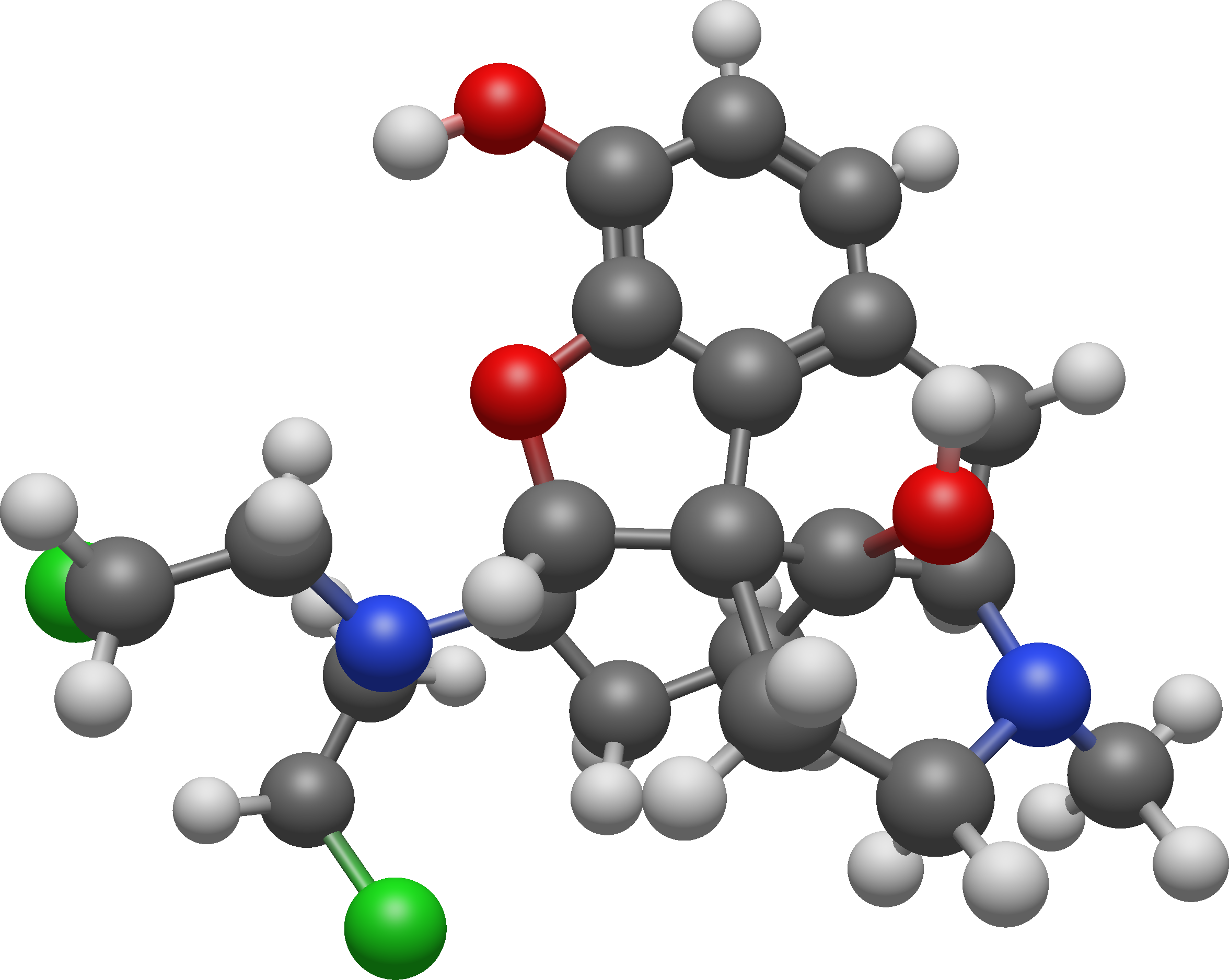

Identifiers
CAS Number	71360-45-7
3D model (JSmol)	Interactive image
ChemSpider	4590365
PubChem CID	5490620
CompTox Dashboard (EPA)	DTXSID10221562
- InChI: InChI=1S/C21H28Cl2N2O3/c1-24-9-6-20-17-13-2-3-15(26)18(17)28-19(20)14(25(10-7-22)11-8-23)4-5-21(20,27)16(24)12-13/h2-3,14,16,19,26-27H,4-12H2,1H3/t14-,16-,19+,20+,21-/m1/s1 Key: KAFQZFNWIPBPJR-GQHLEUQBSA-N
- SMILES: CN1CC[C@]23c4c5ccc(c4O[C@H]2[C@@H](CC[C@]3([C@H]1C5)O)N(CCCl)CCCl)O
- Except where otherwise noted, data are given for materials in their standard state (at 25 °C [77 °F], 100 kPa). Infobox references

Chloroxymorphamine is an opioid and a derivative of oxymorphone which binds irreversibly as an agonist to the μ-opioid receptor.

== See also ==
- β-Chlornaltrexamine
- Naloxazone
- Oxymorphazone
