= Oxymorphone-3-methoxynaltrexonazine =

Morphinan-based opioid

Identifiers
- IUPAC name: (7Z)-7-[(Z)-[3-(cyclopropylmethyl)-4a-hydroxy-9-methoxy-2,4,5,6,7a,13-hexahydro-1H-4,12-methanobenzofuro[3,2-e]isoquinoline-7-ylidene]hydrazinylidene]-3-methyl-2,4,5,6,7a,13-hexahydro-1H-4,12-methanobenzofuro[3,2-e]isoquinoline-4a,9-diol
- CAS Number: 110320-72-4
- PubChem CID: 9589378
- ChemSpider: 7863525
- UNII: O17C5Z4IGE

Chemical and physical data
- Formula: C_{38}H_{44}N_{4}O_{6}
- Molar mass: 652.792 g·mol^{−1}
- 3D model (JSmol): Interactive image
- SMILES: CN1CCC23C4C(=NN=C5CCC6(C7CC8=C9C6(C5OC9=C(C=C8)OC)CCN7CC5CC5)O)CCC2(C1CC1=C3C(=C(C=C1)O)O4)O
- InChI: InChI=1S/C38H44N4O6/c1-41-15-13-35-29-21-5-7-25(43)31(29)47-33(35)23(9-11-37(35,44)27(41)17-21)39-40-24-10-12-38(45)28-18-22-6-8-26(46-2)32-30(22)36(38,34(24)48-32)14-16-42(28)19-20-3-4-20/h5-8,20,27-28,33-34,43-45H,3-4,9-19H2,1-2H3/b39-23-,40-24-; Key:ORPKJVOXWSMNDJ-XCKRHRGHSA-N

Oxymorphone-3-methoxynaltrexonazine (OM-3-MNZ) is a morphinan-based opioid that acts as a selective μ-opioid receptor agonist, unlike the closely related mixed agonist-antagonist Oxymorphonenaltrexonazine.

== See also ==
- Naloxonazine
- Naloxone
- Naltrexone
- Oxymorphone
