= Β-Funaltrexamine =

Chemical compound

β-Funaltrexamine

Clinical data
- Other names: Funaltrexamine; β-Funaltrexamine; Beta-Funaltrexamine; β-FNA; Beta-FNA

Identifiers
- IUPAC name: methyl (E)-4-[[(4R,4aS,7R,7aR,12bS)-3-(cyclopropylmethyl)-4a,9-dihydroxy-1,2,4,5,6,7,7a,13-octahydro-4,12-methanobenzofuro[3,2-e]isoquinolin-7-yl]amino]-4-oxobut-2-enoate or Methyl (2E)-4-{[17-(cyclopropylmethyl)-3,14-dihydroxy-4,5α-epoxymorphinan-6β-yl]amino}-4-oxobut-2-enoate
- CAS Number: 72782-05-9
- PubChem CID: 5311018
- ChemSpider: 4470557
- UNII: 9YX958J3X9
- KEGG: C18127
- ChEBI: CHEBI:81527
- ChEMBL: ChEMBL473136
- CompTox Dashboard (EPA): DTXSID501316803

Chemical and physical data
- Formula: C_{25}H_{30}N_{2}O_{6}
- Molar mass: 454.523 g·mol^{−1}
- 3D model (JSmol): Interactive image
- SMILES: COC(=O)/C=C/C(=O)N[C@@H]1CC[C@]2([C@H]3CC4=C5[C@]2([C@H]1OC5=C(C=C4)O)CCN3CC6CC6)O
- InChI: InChI=1S/C25H30N2O6/c1-32-20(30)7-6-19(29)26-16-8-9-25(31)18-12-15-4-5-17(28)22-21(15)24(25,23(16)33-22)10-11-27(18)13-14-2-3-14/h4-7,14,16,18,23,28,31H,2-3,8-13H2,1H3,(H,26,29)/b7-6+/t16-,18-,23+,24+,25-/m1/s1; Key:PQKHESYTSKMWFP-WZJCLRDWSA-N

β-Funaltrexamine (β-FNA) is an irreversible (covalently bonding) opioid antagonist that was used to create the first crystal structure of the μ-opioid receptor (MOR). It is selective for antagonism of the MOR over the δ-opioid receptor (DOR) and κ-opioid receptor (KOR). Chemically, it is a naltrexone derivative with a methyl-fumaramide group in the 6-position. In addition to its MOR irreversible antagonism, β-FNA is a reversible agonist of the κ-opioid receptor (KOR) and produces KOR-mediated analgesic effects in animals. This has limited its usefulness and contributed to the development of methocinnamox as a more selective functionally irreversible antagonist of the MOR with no significant opioid agonistic actions.

== See also ==
- Naltrexamine
- β-Chlornaltrexamine
- β-Fuoxymorphamine
