= Β-Chlornaltrexamine =

Chemical compound

β-Chlornaltrexamine

Clinical data
- Other names: β-Chlornaltrexamine; Beta-Chlornaltrexamine; β-CNA; Beta-CNA; Chlornaltrexamine; CNA; 6β-[Bis(2-chloroethyl)amino]-17-(cyclopropylmethyl)-4,5α-epoxymorphinan-3,14-diol

Identifiers
- IUPAC name: (4R,4aS,7R,7aR,12bS)-7-[bis(2-chloroethyl)amino]-3-(cyclopropylmethyl)-1,2,4,5,6,7,7a,13-octahydro-4,12-methanobenzofuro[3,2-e]isoquinoline-4a,9-diol
- CAS Number: 67025-94-9
- PubChem CID: 5486190
- ChemSpider: 4588895
- ChEMBL: ChEMBL3228678
- CompTox Dashboard (EPA): DTXSID90985877

Chemical and physical data
- Formula: C_{24}H_{32}Cl_{2}N_{2}O_{3}
- Molar mass: 467.43 g·mol^{−1}
- 3D model (JSmol): Interactive image
- SMILES: C1C[C@]2([C@H]3CC4=C5[C@@]2(CCN3CC6CC6)[C@H]([C@@H]1N(CCCl)CCCl)OC5=C(C=C4)O)O
- InChI: InChI=1S/C24H32Cl2N2O3/c25-8-11-27(12-9-26)17-5-6-24(30)19-13-16-3-4-18(29)21-20(16)23(24,22(17)31-21)7-10-28(19)14-15-1-2-15/h3-4,15,17,19,22,29-30H,1-2,5-14H2/t17-,19-,22+,23+,24-/m1/s1; Key:OSLQQDMGHVQLCH-HRMPSQMFSA-N

β-Chlornaltrexamine (β-CNA) is a non-selective irreversible antagonist of the μ-opioid receptor (MOR), the δ-opioid receptor (DOR), and the κ-opioid receptor (KOR), which forms a covalent bond to the binding sites of these receptors and has ultra-long-lasting opioid antagonist effects. Although it is predominantly antagonistic, β-CNA also shows some irreversible mixed agonist–antagonist activity at the MOR and KOR and some associated analgesic effects. Its alkylating group is a bis(chloroalkyl)amino-residue similar to that of the nitrogen mustards.

The drug was first described by 1978. It should not be confused with its epimer and related drug α-chlornaltrexamine (α-CNA), which is likewise predominantly an irreversible antagonist of the opioid receptors but also shows some irreversible mixed agonist–antagonist activity.

== See also ==
- Naltrexamine, an opioid receptor antagonist and the parent compound
- β-Funaltrexamine, a related irreversible opioid receptor antagonist
- Naloxazone, an irreversible μ-opioid receptor antagonist
- Methocinnamox, an irreversible μ-opioid receptor antagonist
- Chloroxymorphamine, an irreversible opioid receptor agonist
- Oxymorphazone, an irreversible opioid receptor agonist
