= Clocinnamox =

Chemical compound

Clinical data
- Other names: C-CAM; CCAM; NIH-10443

Identifiers
- IUPAC name: (E)-N-[(4R,4aS,7aR,12bR)-3-(cyclopropylmethyl)-9-hydroxy-7-oxo-2,4,5,6,7a,13-hexahydro-1H-4,12-methanobenzofuro[3,2-e]isoquinolin-4a-yl]-3-(4-chlorophenyl)prop-2-enamide or (2E)-3-(4-chlorophenyl)-N-[(5α)-17-(cyclopropylmethyl)-3-hydroxy-6-oxo-4,5-epoxymorphinan-14-yl]acrylamide
- CAS Number: 117332-69-1
- PubChem CID: 6540640
- ChemSpider: 5022878
- ChEMBL: ChEMBL386492

Chemical and physical data
- Formula: C_{29}H_{29}ClN_{2}O_{4}
- Molar mass: 505.01 g·mol^{−1}
- 3D model (JSmol): Interactive image
- SMILES: C1CC1CN2CC[C@]34[C@@H]5C(=O)CC[C@]3([C@H]2CC6=C4C(=C(C=C6)O)O5)NC(=O)/C=C/C7=CC=C(C=C7)Cl
- InChI: InChI=1S/C29H29ClN2O4/c30-20-7-3-17(4-8-20)5-10-24(35)31-29-12-11-22(34)27-28(29)13-14-32(16-18-1-2-18)23(29)15-19-6-9-21(33)26(36-27)25(19)28/h3-10,18,23,27,33H,1-2,11-16H2,(H,31,35)/b10-5+/t23-,27+,28+,29-/m1/s1; Key:RAURUSFBVQLAPW-DNIKMYEQSA-N

Clocinnamox (CCAM or C-CAM; developmental code name NIH-10443) is a selective and irreversible antagonist of the μ-opioid receptor. Closely related compounds include methocinnamox (MCAM) and methoclocinnamox (MCCAM). They were derived via structural modification of buprenorphine. Clocinnamox was first described in the scientific literature by 1992.

== See also ==
- Opioid antagonists
- Opioids
