= Susineridine =

Clinical data
- Other names: YZJ-4729; YZJ4729
- Routes of administration: Intravenous
- Drug class: μ-Opioid receptor biased partial agonist; Analgesic

Pharmacokinetic data
- Elimination half-life: 0.9–2.5 hours

Identifiers
- IUPAC name: 6-propan-2-yl-N-[2-[(9R)-9-pyridin-2-yl-6-oxaspiro[4.5]decan-9-yl]ethyl]-5,6-dihydro-4H-pyrrolo[1,2-b]pyrazol-4-amine
- CAS Number: 2667632-87-1
- PubChem CID: 156805910
- UNII: UNK82E88UZ

Chemical and physical data
- Formula: C_{25}H_{36}N_{4}O
- Molar mass: 408.590 g·mol^{−1}
- 3D model (JSmol): Interactive image
- SMILES: CC(C)C1CC(C2=CC=NN12)NCC[C@]3(CCOC4(C3)CCCC4)C5=CC=CC=N5
- InChI: InChI=1S/C25H36N4O/c1-19(2)22-17-20(21-8-14-28-29(21)22)26-15-11-24(23-7-3-6-13-27-23)12-16-30-25(18-24)9-4-5-10-25/h3,6-8,13-14,19-20,22,26H,4-5,9-12,15-18H2,1-2H3/t20?,22?,24-/m1/s1; Key:RUHISKJCCSWSHB-LLAFXHEGSA-N

Susineridine (INN; developmental code name YZJ-4729) is an atypical μ-opioid receptor (MOR) agonist and opioid analgesic which is under development for the treatment of postoperative pain. It is given intravenously.

The drug acts as a selective biased partial agonist of the MOR, with functional selectivity for activation of G protein signaling over β-arrestin2 recruitment. Its mechanism of action and pharmacological activity are said to be similar to those of oliceridine. However, in-vitro findings suggest that susineridine may have a greater degree of G protein bias than oliceridine. The drug produces analgesic effects in multiple animal models of pain and produces less respiratory depression than morphine or oliceridine. The pharmacokinetics of susineridine in humans have been studied.

Susineridine was patented and first described in the scientific literature in 2023. It is under development by Shanghai Haiyan Pharmaceutical Technology in China. As of May 2025, the drug is in phase 3 clinical trials for postoperative pain.

== See also ==
- μ-Opioid receptor § Biased agonists
