= Trevena, Inc. =

American biopharmaceutical company

- Type: Public
- Traded as: Nasdaq: TRVN; Russell Microcap Index component
- Industry: Biotechnology / Pharmaceutical
- Headquarters: Chesterbrook, Pennsylvania, United States
- Key people: Carrie L. Bourdow (president and CEO)
- Website: trevena.com

Trevena, Inc. is a clinical stage biopharmaceutical company, headquartered in Chesterbrook, Pennsylvania, USA, and is involved in the discovery and development of G-protein coupled receptors (GPCR) biased ligands. Trevena was founded in 2007 with technology licensed from Duke University, which originated in the labs of company founders Robert Lefkowitz, winner of the 2012 Nobel Prize in Chemistry, and Howard Rockman. Trevena's approach to drug discovery is based on utilizing ligand bias, or functional selectivity, at GPCR targets to produce drugs with improved efficacy and reduced side effect profiles. Trevena was named one of the top 15 US startups of 2008 by Business Week.

Trevena's expertise lies in engineering "biased ligands" that activate only the beneficial signaling pathways downstream of a GPCR to unlock new biology and avoid drug adverse effects. Trevena's pipeline currently includes a clinical stage mu-opioid biased ligand for post-operative pain, and discovery-stage programs for chronic pain, migraine, and Parkinson's disease.

== History ==
In 2008, the company raised $24 Million in a Series A financing round led by Alta Partners, Polaris Ventures, New Enterprise Associates, Healthcare Ventures, and Yasuda Economic Development Corporation.

In early 2009, Trevena entered into a collaborative agreement with Ligand Pharmaceuticals to identify biased ligands at numerous GPCRs from a large, diverse chemical library. Later that year, Trevena received a competitively awarded American Recovery and Reinvestment Act Grand Opportunities Grant, spanning two years and funding US$7.65 million of research. The company has disclosed specific interests in the mu Opioid receptor and kappa Opioid receptor. The company raised an additional US$35 million in a B round of venture financing in the summer of 2010. In 2011, Treveva received another NIH grant as part of the NIH Blueprint Neurotherapeutics Network, potentially worth up to $10M USD, to support preclinical development of a delta opioid receptor biased ligand for major depressive disorder. Trevena has received funding from the Michael J. Fox Foundation to explore the potential for delta opioid receptor biased ligands to treat Parkinson's disease.

Trevena's initial public offering was on January 30, 2014.

== Pipeline ==
=== Oliceridine ===
Trevena's leading drug candidate is Oliceridine (TRV130), a G protein-biased ligand binding to the mu opioid receptor for the intravenous treatment of acute moderate-to-severe post-operative pain. Phase I and II clinical trials of TRV130 for postoperative pain are complete. Phase II trials showed effectiveness is analgesia and a wider therapeutic window than morphine. In February 2016, the FDA granted Breakthrough Therapy status to olicerdine. In January 2017, Trevena announced that enrollment for its phase III trials, APOLLO-1 and APOLLO-2 are complete. In November 2018, Trevena received a Complete Response Letter (CRL) from FDA regarding Oliceridine and the need for additional safety data. As of late December 2018, the company has yet to release the meeting minutes from FDA on how to move forward with Oliceridine approval in 2019.

Trevena announced FDA approval of oliceridine on August 7, 2020.

Trevena announced DEA scheduling, Schedule II controlled substance, of oliceridine on October 30, 2020

=== TRV027 ===
Trevena's developed TRV027 for acute heart failure, targets the angiotensin receptor utilizing beta-arrestin bias, an approach that has shown numerous beneficial cardiovascular and renal actions in preclinical species. Trevena completed Phase I clinical trials in 2010. Phase 2 clinical trials on TRV027 began in the spring of 2011. In May 2016, Trevena announced that the TRV027 phase II trial failed to meet its primary endpoints and they were no longer developing the drug.

Trevena announced it has entered into a collaboration with Imperial College London to evaluate the potential of TRV027, a novel AT1 receptor selective agonist, to treat acute lung injury contributing to acute respiratory distress syndrome (ARDS) in COVID-19 patients. ARDS is a major complication leading to mortality associated with COVID-19. Imperial College London will be sponsoring and funding this study, with additional support through the British Heart Foundation Centre for Research Excellence Award.

=== TRV250 ===
TRV250 is a pre-clinical drug candidate for migraine binding to the delta opioid receptor. This avoids the addiction potential of drugs that activate the mu opioid receptor. Other delta opioid-targeting drugs are known to cause seizures, but Trevena hopes to avoid this with TRV250 by bypassing the β-arrestin pathway.

=== TRV734 ===
TRV734 is an oral follow-up to the injected oliceridine (TRV130) mu-opioid biased ligand program. While it binds to the same receptors as opioid analgesics, TRV734 has very weak β-arrestin recruitment, unlike other available opioids, and produced fewer off-target effects. Phase I clinical trials were completed in 2014.
