= Naloxonazine =

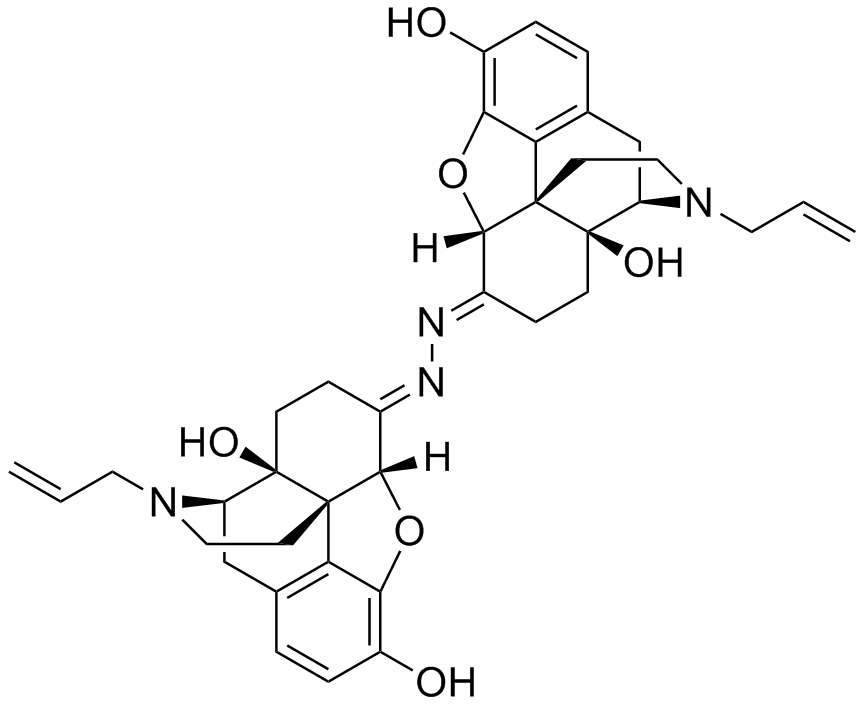

Names
- Other names NIH 10894; NSC 612113, Bis-[5-α-4,5-Epoxy-3,14-dihydroxy-17-(2-propenyl)-morphinan-6-ylidene] hydrazine dihydrochloride

Identifiers
CAS Number	82824-01-9
3D model (JSmol)	Interactive image
ChEMBL	ChEMBL1618376
ChemSpider	7850858
IUPHAR/BPS	1677
PubChem CID	9576413
UNII	BW5W4K4S7Z
CompTox Dashboard (EPA)	DTXSID001002934
- InChI: InChI=1S/C38H42N4O6/c1-3-15-41-17-13-35-29-21-5-7-25(43)31(29)47-33(35)23(9-11-37(35,45)27(41)19-21)39-40-24-10-12-38(46)28-20-22-6-8-26(44)32-30(22)36(38,34(24)48-32)14-18-42(28)16-4-2/h3-8,27-28,33-34,43-46H,1-2,9-20H2/b39-23+,40-24+/t27-,28-,33+,34+,35+,36+,37-,38-/m1/s1 Key: AJPSBXJNFJCCBI-YOHUGVJRSA-N; InChI=1/C38H42N4O6/c1-3-15-41-17-13-35-29-21-5-7-25(43)31(29)47-33(35)23(9-11-37(35,45)27(41)19-21)39-40-24-10-12-38(46)28-20-22-6-8-26(44)32-30(22)36(38,34(24)48-32)14-18-42(28)16-4-2/h3-8,27-28,33-34,43-46H,1-2,9-20H2/b39-23+,40-24+/t27-,28-,33+,34+,35+,36+,37-,38-/m1/s1 Key: AJPSBXJNFJCCBI-YOHUGVJRBH
- SMILES: C=CCN1[C@H]2[C@]3([C@]4(C5=C(C2)C=CC(=C5O[C@H]4/C(=N/N=C\6/[C@@H]7OC8=C(C=CC9=C8[C@]72[C@]([C@@H](C9)N(CC2)CC=C)(CC6)O)O)/CC3)O)CC1)O

Properties
Chemical formula	C_{38}H_{42}N_{4}O_{6}
Molar mass	650.776 g·mol^{−1}
- Except where otherwise noted, data are given for materials in their standard state (at 25 °C [77 °F], 100 kPa). verify (what is ?) Infobox references

Naloxonazine is a potent, irreversible μ-opioid receptor antagonist. Naloxonazine forms spontaneously in acidic solutions of naloxazone, and may be responsible for much or all of the irreversible μ-opioid receptor binding displayed by the latter.

== See also ==
- Oxymorphone-3-methoxynaltrexonazine, a similar opioid also having two complete and mirrored morphinan carbon skeletons
