= SHR9352 =

Chemical compound

Identifiers
- IUPAC name: (1'S)-N-[2-[(9R)-9-pyridin-2-yl-6-oxaspiro[4.5]decan-9-yl]ethyl]spiro[1,3-dithiolane-2,4'-2,3-dihydro-1H-naphthalene]-1'-amine
- CAS Number: 2095345-71-2
- PubChem CID: 129049894
- CompTox Dashboard (EPA): DTXSID901336695

Chemical and physical data
- Formula: C_{28}H_{36}N_{2}OS_{2}
- Molar mass: 480.73 g·mol^{−1}
- 3D model (JSmol): Interactive image
- SMILES: C1CCC2(C1)C[C@](CCO2)(CCN[C@H]3CCC4(C5=CC=CC=C35)SCCS4)C6=CC=CC=N6
- InChI: InChI=1S/C28H36N2OS2/c1-2-8-23-22(7-1)24(10-13-28(23)32-19-20-33-28)29-17-14-26(25-9-3-6-16-30-25)15-18-31-27(21-26)11-4-5-12-27/h1-3,6-9,16,24,29H,4-5,10-15,17-21H2/t24-,26+/m0/s1; Key:WRBLHOVSELHRMG-AZGAKELHSA-N

SHR9352 is a drug which acts as a potent and selective biased agonist at the μ-opioid receptor, selective for activation of the G-protein signalling pathway over β-arrestin 2 recruitment. It was structurally derived from oliceridine by replacing the benzylic side chain with a cyclised group, although only some compounds in the series retained the desired biased agonist profile, with some derivatives such as compound 12 being potent, unbiased μ-opioid full agonists.

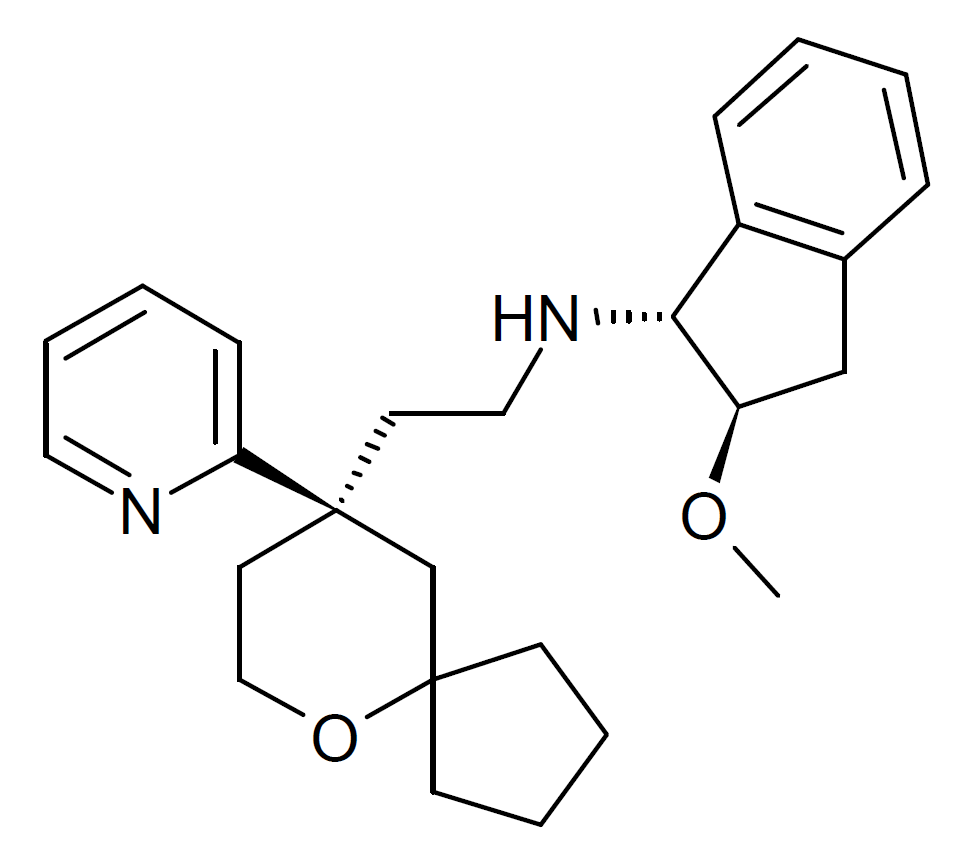
Compound 12 from Li et al.

== See also ==
- μ-Opioid receptor § Biased agonists
