= Irreversible agonist =

Chemical that binds permanently to a receptor

An irreversible agonist is a type of agonist that binds permanently to a receptor in such a manner that the receptor is permanently activated. It is distinct from a mere (reversible) agonist in that the association of an agonist to a receptor is reversible, whereas the binding of an irreversible agonist to a receptor is, at least in theory, irreversible. Oxymorphazone is an example of an irreversible agonist. In practice, the distinction may be more a matter of degree, in which the binding affinity of an irreversible agonist is some orders of magnitude greater than that of an agonist.

== Examples ==
- Oxymorphazone
- Metaphit

== See also ==
- Agonist
- Irreversible antagonist
- Irreversible enzyme inhibitor
