= Axelopran =

Chemical compound

Clinical data
- ATC code: none

Identifiers
- IUPAC name: 3-[(1R,5S)-8-[2-[cyclohexylmethyl-[(2S)-2,3-dihydroxypropanoyl]amino]ethyl]-8-azabicyclo[3.2.1]octan-3-yl]benzamide
- CAS Number: 949904-48-7 949904-50-1 (sulfate)
- PubChem CID: 67156338
- ChemSpider: 31444004
- UNII: 85U7ROB149
- KEGG: D10740

Chemical and physical data
- Formula: C_{26}H_{39}N_{3}O_{4}
- Molar mass: 457.615 g·mol^{−1}
- 3D model (JSmol): Interactive image
- SMILES: C1CCC(CC1)CN(CCN2C3CCC2CC(C3)C4=CC=CC(=C4)C(=O)N)C(=O)C(CO)O
- InChI: InChI=1S/C26H39N3O4/c27-25(32)20-8-4-7-19(13-20)21-14-22-9-10-23(15-21)29(22)12-11-28(26(33)24(31)17-30)16-18-5-2-1-3-6-18/h4,7-8,13,18,21-24,30-31H,1-3,5-6,9-12,14-17H2,(H2,27,32)/t21-,22+,23-,24-/m0/s1; Key:ATLYLVPZNWDJBW-KIHHCIJBSA-N

Axelopran (INN, USAN) (developmental code name TD-1211) is a drug which is under development by Theravance Biopharma and licensed to Glycyx for all indications. It acts as a peripherally acting μ-opioid receptor antagonist and also acts on κ-, and δ-opioid receptors, with similar affinity for the μ- and κ-opioid receptors and about an order of magnitude lower affinity for the δ-opioid receptor. Recent data suggests that μ-opioid antagonists have a direct effect on overall survival in patients with advanced cancer.

A μ-opioid agonist (e.g., morphine) have been shown to have multiple pro-tumor effects in vivo and in vitro, which can be blocked with μ-opioid antagonists including promoting angiogenesis, accelerating tumor cell proliferation, and modifying the response to chemotherapeutics. An extensive body of literature has shown diverse and profound immunosuppressive effects of μ-opioid activation in vivo and in vitro.

Recent data for axelopran in three different pre-clinical models of cancer shows that a μ-opioid antagonist isolates distinct effects of the endogenous opioid system on tumor growth and works in combination with checkpoint inhibitors. The study of axelopran in melanoma in a zebrafish embryo model with an immature immune system and no microbiome tested axelopran direct effects on tumor growth and metastasis. The study of breast cancer in chicken eggs with a functional immune system and no microbiome tested the direct effect of axelopran on tumor weight, tumor immune infiltration, metastasis and angiogenesis. The study of axelopran in MC-38 syngeneic colorectal cancer in mice in combination with murine anti-PD-1 antibody tested the effect of a μ-opioid blockade on tumor volume and survival in a full in vivo model with both fully functional immune system and mature gut function and enteric microbiome.

All three pre-clinical studies showed a significant impact of axelopran on their respective endpoints, suggesting that μ-opioid blockade is useful across different tumor types and has multiple mechanisms of action, including direct suppression of tumor cell proliferation, angiogenesis and metastasis, and immune surveillance. Furthermore, axelopran and murine anti-PD-1 antibody were synergistic in slowing tumor growth and increasing survival in the syngeneic mouse model.

Axelopran has potent μ-opioid receptor antagonist activity on the gastrointestinal tract in vivo, and thus it produces a dose-dependent inhibition of opioid-induced delaying in gastric emptying in mice and rats following subcutaneous or oral administration.

== See also ==
- Bevenopran
- Eluxadoline
- Methylnaltrexone
- Naldemedine
