= Oxymorphazone =

Opioid analgesic

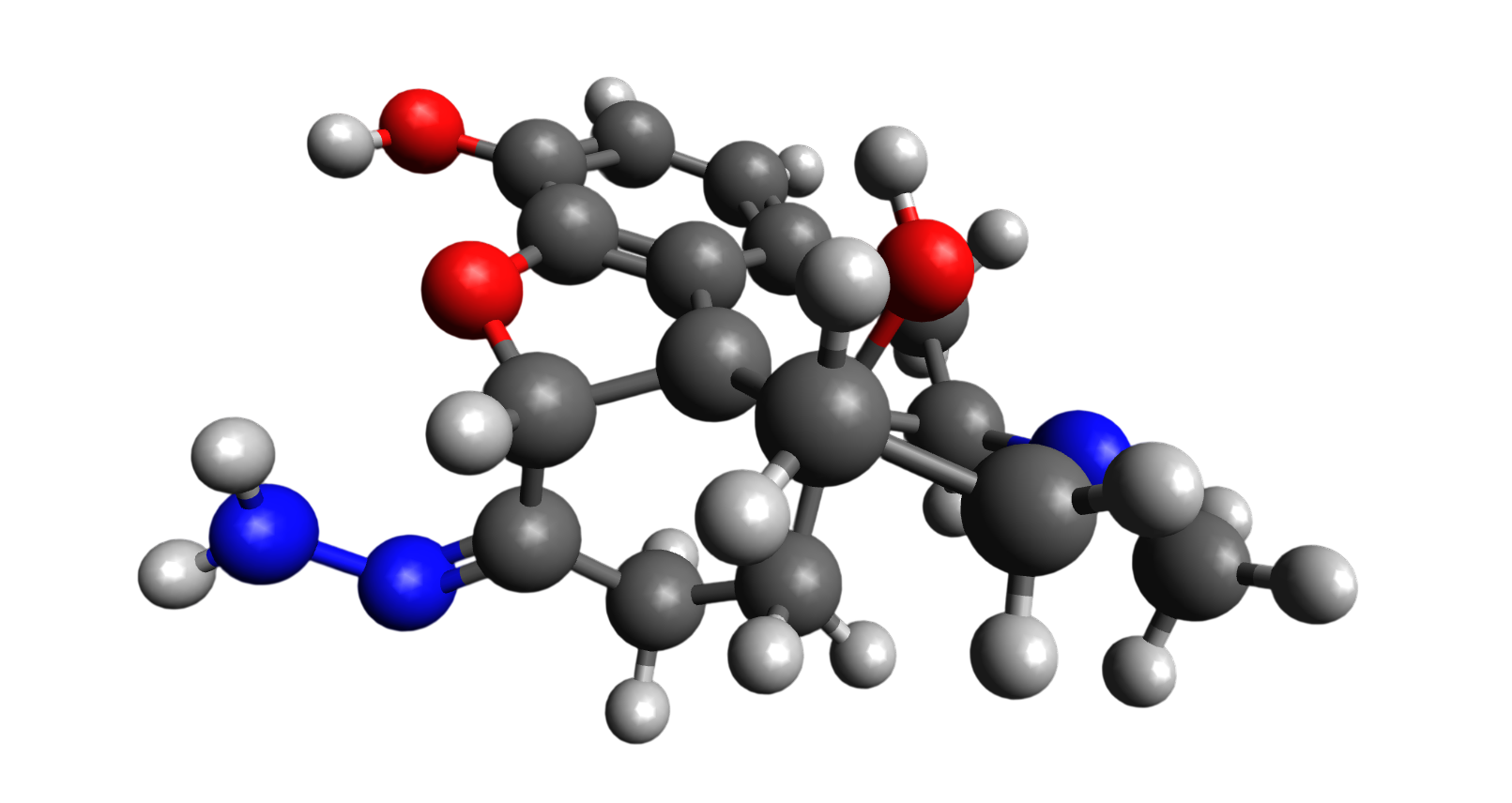

Clinical data
- Other names: Oxymorphone hydrazone
- ATC code: none

Identifiers
- IUPAC name: (5α,6E)-3,14-dihydroxy-17-methyl-4,5-epoxy-morphinan-6-one hydrazone
- CAS Number: 73697-35-5
- PubChem CID: 9577748
- ChemSpider: 23231158
- UNII: 9J727K8R3U

Chemical and physical data
- Formula: C_{17}H_{21}N_{3}O_{3}
- Molar mass: 315.373 g·mol^{−1}
- 3D model (JSmol): Interactive image
- SMILES: CN1CC[C@]23[C@@H]4/C(=N/N)/CC[C@]2([C@H]1CC5=C3C(=C(C=C5)O)O4)O
- InChI: InChI=1S/C17H21N3O3/c1-20-7-6-16-13-9-2-3-11(21)14(13)23-15(16)10(19-18)4-5-17(16,22)12(20)8-9/h2-3,12,15,21-22H,4-8,18H2,1H3/b19-10-/t12-,15+,16+,17-/m1/s1; Key:VOFTYIFRRWVMOO-YKKXUTDFSA-N

Oxymorphazone is an opioid analgesic drug related to oxymorphone. Oxymorphazone is a potent and long acting μ-opioid agonist which binds irreversibly to the receptor, forming a covalent bond which prevents it from detaching once bound. This gives it an unusual pharmacological profile, and while oxymorphazone is only around half the potency of oxymorphone, with higher doses the analgesic effect becomes extremely long lasting, with a duration of up to 48 hours when administered intraventricularly. However, tolerance to analgesia develops rapidly with repeated doses, as chronically activated opioid receptors are rapidly internalised by β-arrestins, similar to the results of non-covalent binding by repeated doses of agonists with extremely high binding affinity such as lofentanil.

== See also ==
- Chlornaltrexamine, an irreversible mixed μ-opioid agonist-antagonist
- Chloroxymorphamine, another irreversible μ-opioid full agonist
- Naloxazone, an irreversible μ-opioid antagonist
