= TRV734 =

Chemical compound

Clinical data
- Other names: TRV-734
- Routes of administration: Oral
- Drug class: μ-Opioid receptor biased agonist; Analgesic

Pharmacokinetic data
- Elimination half-life: 1.9–2.5 hours

Identifiers
- IUPAC name: N-[(5-fluoropyridin-3-yl)methyl]-2-[(9R)-9-pyridin-2-yl-6-oxaspiro[4.5]decan-9-yl]ethanamine
- CAS Number: 1401029-50-2
- PubChem CID: 72695064
- UNII: 3B0O45B37W

Chemical and physical data
- Formula: C_{22}H_{28}FN_{3}O
- Molar mass: 369.484 g·mol^{−1}
- 3D model (JSmol): Interactive image
- SMILES: C1CCC2(C1)C[C@](CCO2)(CCNCC3=CC(=CN=C3)F)C4=CC=CC=N4
- InChI: InChI=1S/C22H28FN3O/c23-19-13-18(15-25-16-19)14-24-11-8-21(20-5-1-4-10-26-20)9-12-27-22(17-21)6-2-3-7-22/h1,4-5,10,13,15-16,24H,2-3,6-9,11-12,14,17H2/t21-/m1/s1; Key:CRKVMJHROLSFMV-OAQYLSRUSA-N

TRV734 is a drug developed by Trevena, Inc. which acts as a biased agonist at the μ-opioid receptor, selective for activation of the G protein signaling pathway over β-arrestin 2 recruitment. It is closely related to oliceridine (TRV130) and has a similar pharmacological profile, but unlike oliceridine which has to be injected, TRV734 is suitable to be administered orally. The drug reached phase 2 clinical trials for treatment of pain but was discontinued for this indication. It is also under development for treatment of opioid-related disorders, in association with the National Institute on Drug Abuse (NIDA) and having reached phase 1 trials for this use, but no recent development has been reported.

== See also ==
- μ-Opioid receptor § Biased agonists
