= Naloxol =

α-naloxol
β-naloxol

Names
- IUPAC names α-naloxol: (4R,4aS,7S,7aR,12bS)-3-allyl-2,3,4,4a,5,6,7,7a-octahydro-1H-4,12-methanobenzofuro[3,2-e]isoquinoline-4a,7,9-triol β-naloxol: (4R,4aS,7R,7aR,12bS)-3-allyl-2,3,4,4a,5,6,7,7a-octahydro-1H-4,12-methanobenzofuro[3,2-e]isoquinoline-4a,7,9-triol

Identifiers
CAS Number	20410-95-1 (α); 53154-12-4 (β); 58691-01-3 (α/β)
3D model (JSmol)	(α): Interactive image; (β): Interactive image
ChemSpider	4590928 (α); 9177198 (β)
ECHA InfoCard	100.236.696
PubChem CID	5492271 (α); 5492293 (β)
UNII	FLW43Q2H9L (α); QY92ZV4EHS (β); K2SIX47W55 (α/β)
CompTox Dashboard (EPA)	DTXSID20942579
- InChI: InChI=1S/C19H23NO4/c1-2-8-20-9-7-18-15-11-3-4-12(21)16(15)24-17(18)13(22)5-6-19(18,23)14(20)10-11/h2-4,13-14,17,21-23H,1,5-10H2/t13-,14+,17-,18-,19+/m0/s1 Key: HMWHERQFMBEHNG-AQQQZIQISA-N; (α): InChI=1/C19H23NO4/c1-2-8-20-9-7-18-15-11-3-4-12(21)16(15)24-17(18)13(22)5-6-19(18,23)14(20)10-11/h2-4,13-14,17,21-23H,1,5-10H2/t13-,14+,17-,18-,19+/m0/s1 Key: HMWHERQFMBEHNG-AQQQZIQIBS; (β): InChI=1/C19H23NO4/c1-2-8-20-9-7-18-15-11-3-4-12(21)16(15)24-17(18)13(22)5-6-19(18,23)14(20)10-11/h2-4,13-14,17,21-23H,1,5-10H2/t13-,14-,17+,18+,19-/m1/s1 Key: HMWHERQFMBEHNG-CSJNCLCHBP; (β): InChI=1S/C19H23NO4/c1-2-8-20-9-7-18-15-11-3-4-12(21)16(15)24-17(18)13(22)5-6-19(18,23)14(20)10-11/h2-4,13-14,17,21-23H,1,5-10H2/t13-,14-,17+,18+,19-/m1/s1 Key: HMWHERQFMBEHNG-CSJNCLCHSA-N
- SMILES: (α): OC1=C2C3=C(C=C1)C[C@@H]4[C@]5(O)CC[C@H](O)[C@H](O2)[C@@]53CCN4CC=C; (β): OC1=C2C3=C(C=C1)C[C@@H]4[C@]5(O)CC[C@@H](O)[C@H](O2)[C@@]53CCN4CC=C

Properties
Chemical formula	C_{19}H_{23}NO_{4}
Molar mass	329.396 g·mol^{−1}
- Except where otherwise noted, data are given for materials in their standard state (at 25 °C [77 °F], 100 kPa). verify (what is ?) Infobox references

Naloxol is an opioid antagonist closely related to naloxone. It exists in two isomeric forms, α-naloxol and β-naloxol.

α-naloxol is a human metabolite of naloxone. Synthetically, α-naloxol can be prepared from naloxone by reduction of the ketone group, and β-naloxol can be prepared from α-naloxol by a Mitsunobu reaction.

Naloxol can be said to be the oxymorphol analogue of naloxone.

== See also ==
- Naloxegol
