= Naloxazone =

Chemical compound

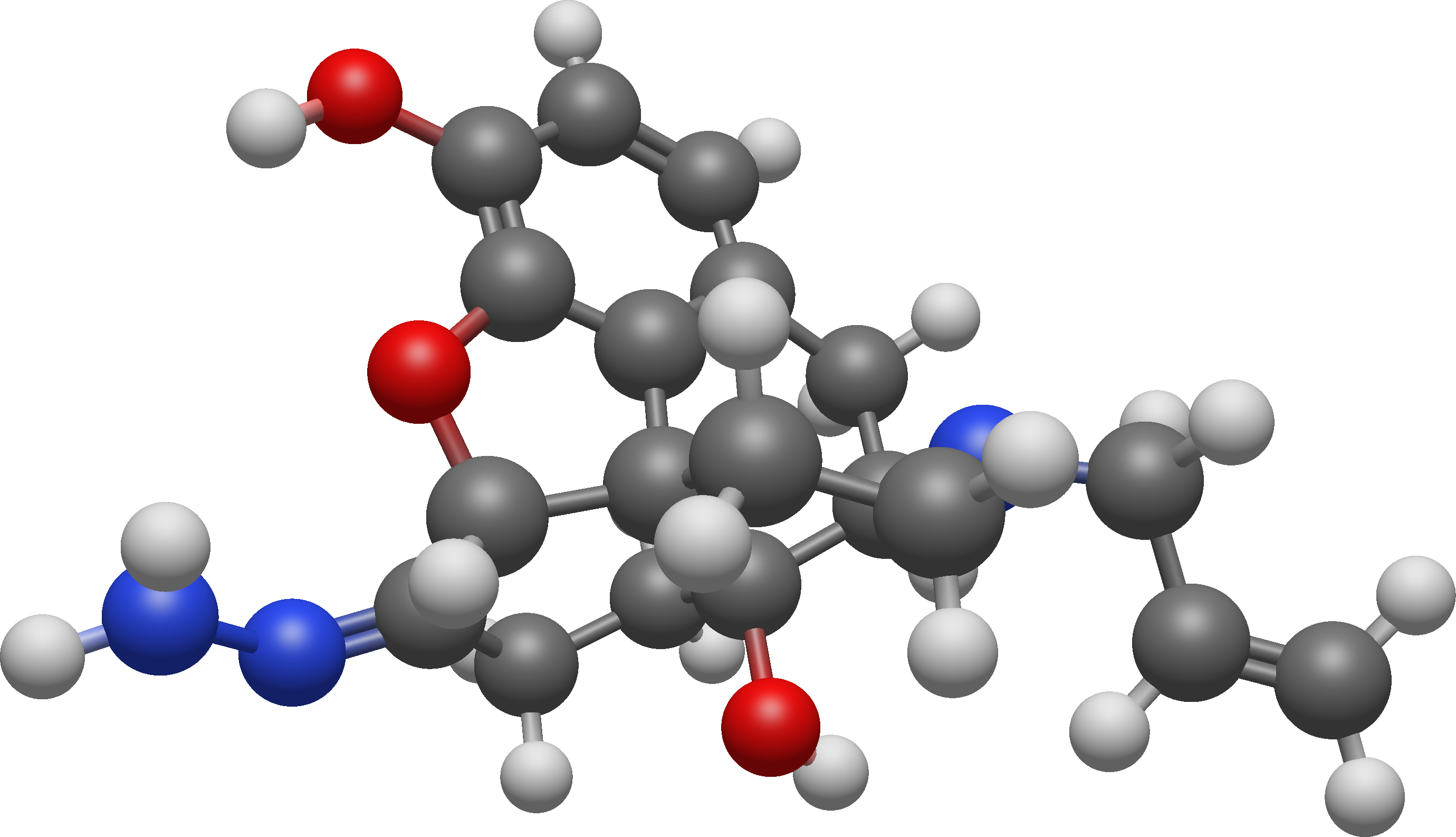

Names
- IUPAC name (5α)-17-Allyl-3,14-dihydroxy-4,5-epoxymorphinan-6-one hydrazone
- Other names Naloxone- 6-hydrazone

Identifiers
CAS Number	73674-85-8
3D model (JSmol)	Interactive image
ChEMBL	ChEMBL354010
ChemSpider	23230642
PubChem CID	9576788
- InChI: InChI=1S/C19H23N3O3/c1-2-8-22-9-7-18-15-11-3-4-13(23)16(15)25-17(18)12(21-20)5-6-19(18,24)14(22)10-11/h2-4,14,17,23-24H,1,5-10,20H2/b21-12+/t14-,17+,18+,19-/m1/s1 Key: XQQRNWNMEFUSMN-UTWDOOMRSA-N
- SMILES: C=CCN1CCC23C4C(=NN)CCC2(C1CC5=C3C(=C(C=C5)O)O4)O

Properties
Chemical formula	C_{19}H_{23}N_{3}O_{3}
Molar mass	341.40422 g/mol
- Except where otherwise noted, data are given for materials in their standard state (at 25 °C [77 °F], 100 kPa). verify (what is ?) Infobox references

Naloxazone is an irreversible μ-opioid receptor antagonist which is selective for the μ_{1} receptor subtype. Naloxazone produces very long lasting antagonist effects as it forms a covalent bond to the active site of the μ-opioid receptor, thus making it impossible for the molecule to unbind and blocking the receptor permanently until the receptor is recycled by endocytosis.

Naloxazone is the hydrazone analog of naloxone. It has been reported that naloxazone is unstable in acidic solution, dimerizing into the more stable and much more potent antagonist naloxonazine via the free NH_{2} of the hydrazone to form an azine linkage. Under conditions in which no naloxonazine formation could be detected, naloxazone did not display irreversible μ opioid receptor binding.

== See also ==
- Chlornaltrexamine, an irreversible mixed agonist-antagonist
- Oxymorphazone, an irreversible μ-opioid full agonist
