= Naloxegol =

Medication used in the treatment for Opioid-Induced Constipation

Clinical data
- Trade names: Movantik, Moventig
- Other names: NKTR-118
- AHFS/Drugs.com: movantik
- License data: US DailyMed: Naloxegol
- Routes of administration: By mouth
- ATC code: A06AH03 (WHO)

Legal status
- Legal status: AU: S4 (Prescription only); CA: ℞-only; US: ℞-only; EU: Rx only

Pharmacokinetic data
- Protein binding: ~4.2%
- Metabolism: Liver (CYP3A)
- Elimination half-life: 6–11 h
- Excretion: Feces (68%), urine (16%)

Identifiers
- IUPAC name: (5α,6α)-4,5-epoxy-6-(3,6,9,12,15,18,21-heptaoxadocos-1-yloxy)-17-(2-propen-1-yl)morphinan-3,14-diol
- CAS Number: 854601-70-0
- PubChem CID: 56959087
- ChemSpider: 28651656
- UNII: 44T7335BKE
- KEGG: D10479
- ChEBI: CHEBI:82975
- CompTox Dashboard (EPA): DTXSID80234684

Chemical and physical data
- Formula: C_{34}H_{53}NO_{11}
- Molar mass: 651.794 g·mol^{−1}
- 3D model (JSmol): Interactive image
- SMILES: COCCOCCOCCOCCOCCOCCOCCO[C@H]1CC[C@]2([C@H]3Cc4ccc(c5c4[C@]2([C@H]1O5)CCN3CC=C)O)O
- InChI: InChI=1S/C34H53NO11/c1-3-9-35-10-8-33-30-26-4-5-27(36)31(30)46-32(33)28(6-7-34(33,37)29(35)25-26)45-24-23-44-22-21-43-20-19-42-18-17-41-16-15-40-14-13-39-12-11-38-2/h3-5,28-29,32,36-37H,1,6-25H2,2H3/t28-,29+,32-,33-,34+/m0/s1; Key:XNKCCCKFOQNXKV-ZRSCBOBOSA-N

Naloxegol (INN; PEGylated naloxol; trade names Movantik and Moventig) is a peripherally acting μ-opioid receptor antagonist developed by AstraZeneca, licensed from Nektar Therapeutics, for the treatment of opioid-induced constipation. It was approved in 2014 in adult patients with chronic, non-cancer pain. Doses of 25 mg were found safe and well tolerated for 52 weeks. When given concomitantly with opioid analgesics, naloxegol reduced constipation-related side effects, while maintaining comparable levels of analgesia.

The most common side effects are abdominal pain, diarrhea, nausea, flatulence, vomiting, and headache.

Naloxegol was previously a Schedule II drug in the United States because of its chemical similarity to noroxymorphone. It was officially decontrolled in January 2015. It was reclassified as a prescription drug after the FDA and DEA concluded that the impermeability of the blood–brain barrier to this compound made it non-habit-forming, and so without the potential for abuse.

== Medical use ==
Naloxegol is indicated for the treatment of opioid-induced constipation (OIC) in people with chronic non-cancer pain.

== Side effects ==
The most common side effects are abdominal pain, diarrhea, nausea, flatulence, vomiting, and headache.

== Pharmacodynamic properties ==
Naloxegol inhibits opioid binding in μ-opioid receptors in the gastrointestinal tract, thus decreasing the constipating effects (slowing of gastrointestinal motility and transit, hypertonicity, increased fluid reabsorption) associated with opioids.

If naloxegol is coadministered with other opioid antagonists, there is a potential for additive effect and increased risk of opioid withdrawal.

== Mechanism of action ==
Chemically, naloxegol is a pegylated (polyethylene glycol-modified) derivative of α-naloxol. Specifically, the 6-α-hydroxyl group of α-naloxol is connected via an ether linkage to the free hydroxyl group of a monomethoxy-terminated n=7 oligomer of PEG, shown extending at the lower left of the molecule image at right. The "n=7" defines the number of two-carbon ethylenes, and so the chain length, of the attached PEG chain, and the "monomethoxy" indicates that the terminal hydroxyl group of the PEG is "capped" with a methyl group. The pegylation of the 6-α-hydroxyl side chain of naloxol prevents the drug from crossing the blood–brain barrier (BBB).
