= Mu-opioid receptor =

Class of opioid receptors found in humans

OPRM1

Identifiers
- Aliases: OPRM1, LMOR, M-OR-1, MOP, MOR, MOR1, OPRM, opioid receptor mu 1
- External IDs: OMIM: 600018; MGI: 97441; GeneCards: OPRM1

Gene location (Human)
Chr.	Chromosome 6 (human)
Band	6q25.2	Start	154,010,496 bp
Band	6q25.2	End	154,246,867 bp

Gene location (Mouse)
Chr.	Chromosome 10 (mouse)
Band	10 A1|10 1.85 cM	Start	6,708,506 bp
Band	10 A1|10 1.85 cM	End	6,988,198 bp
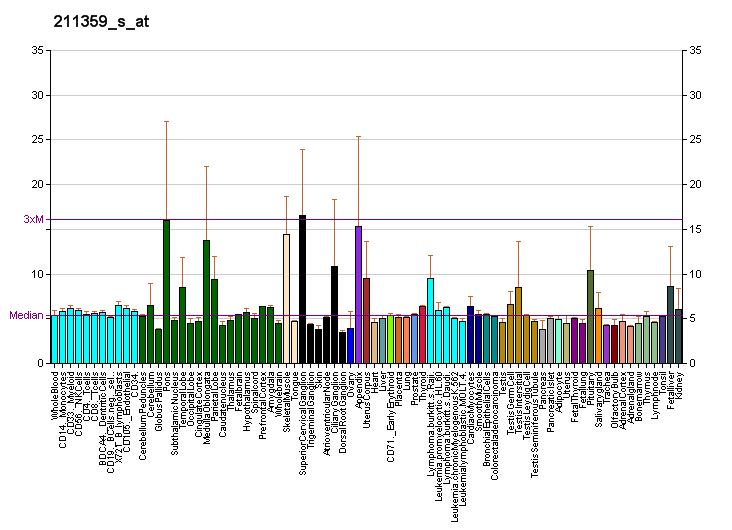
RNA expression pattern
Bgee	Human / Mouse (ortholog); Top expressed in: gonad; testicle; right hemisphere of cerebellum; sperm; left testis; right testis; prefrontal cortex; Brodmann area 9; nucleus accumbens; hypothalamus / Top expressed in: medial habenular nucleus; autonomic nerve plexus; myenteric plexus; Subplate; spinal ganglia; embryo; nucleus of trigeminal nuclear complex; greater petrosal nerve; superior frontal gyrus; granulocyte; More reference expression data
BioGPS	More reference expression data
Gene ontology
Molecular function	voltage-gated calcium channel activity; morphine receptor activity; G protein-coupled receptor activity; neuropeptide binding; signal transducer activity; filamin binding; G protein-coupled opioid receptor activity; protein binding; beta-endorphin receptor activity; G-protein alpha-subunit binding; protein C-terminus binding; protein domain specific binding; G-protein beta-subunit binding; peptide binding
Cellular component	postsynapse; cytoplasm; integral component of membrane; perikaryon; Golgi apparatus; membrane; focal adhesion; integral component of plasma membrane; dendrite membrane; endoplasmic reticulum; neuron projection; membrane raft; sarcolemma; dendrite cytoplasm; plasma membrane; dendrite; endosome; axon; cell projection; spine apparatus; integral component of postsynaptic membrane; integral component of presynaptic membrane
Biological process	positive regulation of appetite; negative regulation of adenylate cyclase activity; adenylate cyclase-activating dopamine receptor signaling pathway; sensory perception; negative regulation of cAMP-mediated signaling; adenylate cyclase-inhibiting G protein-coupled receptor signaling pathway; regulation of sensory perception of pain; eating behavior; locomotory behavior; estrous cycle; positive regulation of cytosolic calcium ion concentration; positive regulation of nitric oxide biosynthetic process; G protein-coupled receptor signaling pathway, coupled to cyclic nucleotide second messenger; negative regulation of Wnt protein secretion; wound healing; acute inflammatory response to antigenic stimulus; positive regulation of cAMP-mediated signaling; positive regulation of neurogenesis; regulation of NMDA receptor activity; phospholipase C-activating G protein-coupled receptor signaling pathway; response to morphine; response to lipopolysaccharide; negative regulation of nitric oxide biosynthetic process; calcium ion transmembrane transport; excitatory postsynaptic potential; positive regulation of ERK1 and ERK2 cascade; behavioral response to ethanol; response to food; sensory perception of pain; response to radiation; response to growth factor; response to ethanol; signal transduction; negative regulation of cell population proliferation; negative regulation of cytosolic calcium ion concentration; adenylate cyclase-inhibiting opioid receptor signaling pathway; response to cocaine; cellular response to morphine; chemical synaptic transmission; neuropeptide signaling pathway; G protein-coupled opioid receptor signaling pathway; G protein-coupled receptor signaling pathway; cytokine-mediated signaling pathway; regulation of cellular response to stress; negative regulation of adenylate cyclase-activating G protein-coupled receptor signaling pathway; adenylate cyclase-inhibiting G protein-coupled acetylcholine receptor signaling pathway
Sources:Amigo / QuickGO
Orthologs
Databases	NCBI: entry; OMA: entry
Species	Human	Mouse
Entrez	4988	18390
Ensembl	ENSG00000112038	ENSMUSG00000000766
UniProt	P35372	P42866
RefSeq (mRNA)	NM_000914; NM_001008503; NM_001008504; NM_001008505; NM_001145279 NM_001145280; NM_001145281; NM_001145282; NM_001145283; NM_001145284; NM_001145285; NM_001145286; NM_001145287; NM_001285522; NM_001285523; NM_001285524; NM_001285526; NM_001285527; NM_001285528	NM_001039652; NM_011013; NM_001302793; NM_001302794; NM_001302795 NM_001302796; NM_001304937; NM_001304938; NM_001304948; NM_001304950; NM_001304955
RefSeq (protein)	NP_000905; NP_001008503; NP_001008504; NP_001008505; NP_001138751 NP_001138752; NP_001138753; NP_001138754; NP_001138755; NP_001138756; NP_001138757; NP_001138758; NP_001138759; NP_001272451; NP_001272452; NP_001272453; NP_001272455; NP_001272456; NP_001272457	NP_001034741; NP_001289722; NP_001289723; NP_001289724; NP_001289725 NP_001291866; NP_001291867; NP_001291877; NP_001291879; NP_001291884
Location (UCSC)	Chr 6: 154.01 – 154.25 Mb	Chr 10: 6.71 – 6.99 Mb
PubMed search
- Wikidata
View/Edit Human	View/Edit Mouse

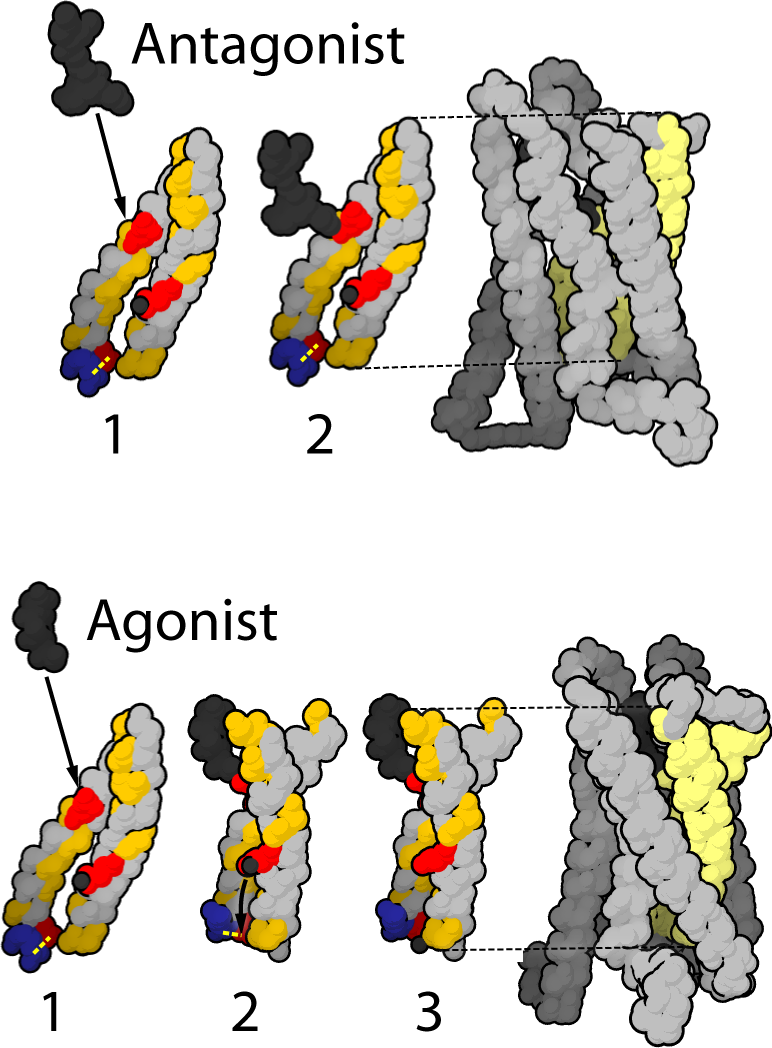
Active and inactive μ-opioid receptors

The μ-opioid receptors (using the Greek letter mu, abbreviated MOR) are a class of opioid receptors with a high affinity for enkephalins and beta-endorphin, but a low affinity for dynorphins. They are also referred to as μ(mu)-opioid peptide (MOP) receptors. The prototypical μ-opioid receptor agonist is morphine, the primary psychoactive alkaloid in opium and for which the receptor was named, with mu being the first letter of Morpheus, the compound's namesake in the original Greek. It is an inhibitory G-protein coupled receptor that activates the G_{i} alpha subunit, inhibiting adenylate cyclase activity, lowering cAMP levels.

== Structure ==
The structure of the inactive μ-opioid receptor has been determined with the antagonists β-FNA and alvimopan. Many structures of the active state are also available, with agonists including DAMGO, β-endorphin, fentanyl and morphine. The structure with the agonist BU72 has the highest resolution, but contains unexplained features that may be experimental artifacts. This large body of evidence has enabled structure-based design of a new class of opioids with functional selectivity.

== Splice variants ==
Three variants of the μ-opioid receptor are well characterized, though reverse transcription polymerase chain reaction has identified up to 10 total splice variants in humans.

μ_{1}	More is known about the μ_{1} opioid receptor than the other variants.
μ_{2}	TRIMU 5 is a selective agonist of the μ_{2} receptor.
μ_{3}	The μ_{3} variant was first described in 2003. It is responsive to opiate alkaloids but not opioid peptides.

== Location ==
They can exist either presynaptically or postsynaptically depending upon cell types.

The μ-opioid receptors exist mostly presynaptically in the periaqueductal gray region, and in the superficial dorsal horn of the spinal cord (specifically the substantia gelatinosa of Rolando). Other areas where they have been located include the external plexiform layer of the olfactory bulb, the nucleus accumbens, in several layers of the cerebral cortex, and in some of the nuclei of the amygdala, as well as the nucleus of the solitary tract.

Some MORs are also found in the intestinal tract. Activation of these receptors inhibits peristaltic action which causes constipation, a major side effect of μ agonists.

== Activation ==
MOR can mediate acute changes in neuronal excitability via suppression of presynaptic release of GABA. Activation of the MOR leads to different effects on dendritic spines depending upon the agonist, and may be an example of functional selectivity at the μ-receptor. The physiological and pathological roles of these two distinct mechanisms remain to be clarified. Perhaps, both might be involved in opioid addiction and opioid-induced deficits in cognition.

Activation of the μ-opioid receptor by an agonist such as morphine causes analgesia, sedation, slightly reduced blood pressure, itching, nausea, euphoria, decreased respiration, miosis (constricted pupils), and decreased bowel motility often leading to constipation. Some of these effects, such as analgesia, sedation, euphoria, itching and decreased respiration, tend to lessen with continued use as tolerance develops. Miosis and reduced bowel motility tend to persist; little tolerance develops to these effects.

The canonical MOR1 isoform is responsible for morphine-induced analgesia, whereas the alternatively spliced MOR1D isoform (through heterodimerization with the gastrin-releasing peptide receptor) is required for morphine-induced itching.

== Deactivation ==
As with other G protein-coupled receptors, signalling by the μ-opioid receptor is terminated through several different mechanisms, which are upregulated with chronic use, leading to rapid tachyphylaxis. The most important regulatory proteins for the MOR are the β-arrestins arrestin beta 1 and arrestin beta 2, and the RGS proteins RGS4, RGS9-2, RGS14, and RGSZ2.

Long-term or high-dose use of opioids may also lead to additional mechanisms of tolerance becoming involved. This includes downregulation of MOR gene expression, so the number of receptors presented on the cell surface is actually reduced, as opposed to the more short-term desensitisation induced by β-arrestins or RGS proteins. Another long-term adaptation to opioid use can be upregulation of glutamate and other pathways in the brain which can exert an opioid-opposing effect, so reduce the effects of opioid drugs by altering downstream pathways, regardless of MOR activation.

== Tolerance and overdoses ==
Fatal opioid overdose typically occurs due to bradypnea, hypoxemia, and decreased cardiac output (hypotension occurs due to vasodilation, and bradycardia further contributes to decreased cardiac output). A potentiation effect occurs when opioids are combined with ethanol, benzodiazepines, barbiturates, or other central depressants which can result in rapid loss of consciousness and an increased risk of fatal overdose.

Substantial tolerance to respiratory depression develops quickly, and tolerant individuals can withstand larger doses. However, tolerance to respiratory depression is quickly lost during withdrawal and may be completely reversed within a week. Many overdoses occur in people who return to their previous dose after having lost their tolerance following cessation of opioids. This puts addicts who receive medical treatment for opioid addiction at great risk of overdose when they are released, as they may be particularly vulnerable to relapse.

Less commonly, massive overdoses have been known to cause circulatory collapse from vasodilation and bradycardia.

Opioid overdoses can be rapidly reversed through the use of opioid antagonists, naloxone being the most widely used example. Opioid antagonists work by binding competitively to μ-opioid receptors and displacing opioid agonists. Additional doses of naloxone may be necessary and supportive care should be given to prevent hypoxic brain injury by monitoring vital signs.

Tramadol and tapentadol carry additional risks associated with their dual effects as SNRIs and can cause serotonin syndrome and seizures. Despite these risks, there is evidence to suggest that these drugs have a lower risk of respiratory depression compared to morphine.

== Ligands ==
=== Agonists ===
==== Endogenous ====
- Dynorphins (e.g., dynorphin A, dynorphin B)
- Endomorphins (endomorphin-1, endomorphin-2)
- Endorphins (e.g., β-endorphin)
- Enkephalins (leu-enkephalin, met-enkephalin, adrenorphin)

==== Full ====
- Codeine
- Fentanyl
- Heroin
- Hydrocodone
- Hydromorphone
- Levorphanol
- Methadone
- Morphine
- Oxycodone
- Oxymorphone
- Pethidine (meperidine)
- Tianeptine

==== Partial ====
- Buprenorphine
- Butorphanol (or antagonist)
- Dezocine
- Nalbuphine (or antagonist)
- Oliceridine
- Pentazocine (or antagonist)
- Tramadol (or partial agonist)
- 7-Hydroxymitragynine

==== Biased ====
- MEB-1170
- Oliceridine (TRV130)
- PZM21
- SHR9352
- SR-15099
- SR-17018
- Susineridine (YZJ-4729)
- Tegileridine (SHR-8554)
- TRV734

==== Peripherally selective ====
- Loperamide

==== Irreversible ====
- Chloroxymorphamine
- Methoclocinnamox
- Oxymorphazone

=== Antagonists ===
==== Antagonists ====
- Cyclazocine
- Diprenorphine
- Levallorphan
- Nalodeine
- Nalorphine
- Naloxone
- Naltrexone
- Samidorphan

Note that some of the above drugs may actually be very weak partial agonists rather than silent antagonists.

=== Inverse agonists ===
- Cyprodime
- Nalmefene

==== Peripherally selective ====
- 6β-Naltrexol
- Alvimopan
- Axelopran
- Bevenopran
- Methylnaltrexone
- Naldemedine
- Naloxegol

==== Gastrointestinally selective ====
- Naloxone (with oral administration)

==== Irreversible ====
- β-Chlornaltrexamine
- β-Funaltrexamine
- Clocinnamox
- Methocinnamox
- Naloxazone
- Naloxonazine

=== Allosteric modulators ===
==== Positive ====
- BMS-986121
- BMS‐986122
- Comp5
- Hydroxynorketamine (HNK)
- Ignavine
- Ketamine
- MS1
- Norketamine
- Oxytocin

==== Negative allosteric modulators ====
- Δ^{9}-Tetrahydrocannabinol (THC) (weak)
- Cannabidiol (weak)
- "Compound 698"
- Salvinorin A (weak)

==== Silent ====
- BMS-986124

==== Unsorted ====
- SCH-202676 (highly non-selective)

== See also ==
- δ-opioid receptor
- κ-opioid receptor
