= Irreversible antagonist =

Antagonist that binds permanently to a receptor

An irreversible antagonist is a type of antagonist that binds permanently to a receptor, either by forming a covalent bond to the active site, or alternatively just by binding so tightly that the rate of dissociation is effectively zero at relevant time scales. This permanently deactivates the receptor and is usually followed by rapid internalisation and recycling of the non-functional receptor protein. Irreversible enzyme inhibitors that act similarly are clinically used and include drugs such as aspirin, omeprazole and monoamine oxidase inhibitors.

== Examples ==
- Naloxazone
- Phenoxybenzamine

== See also ==
- Irreversible agonist
- Irreversible enzyme inhibitor
