= Imidazoquinoline =

Imidazoquinoline, and locations of possible modification to form its derivatives. The R1 group should be a N atom with the R1 attached to it.

Imidazoquinoline is a tricyclic organic molecule; its derivatives and compounds are often used for antiviral and antiallergic creams.

== Derivatives ==
- Dactolisib
- Imiquimod
- Gardiquimod
- Resiquimod
- Sumanirole
