= Shlomo Ben-Haim =

Israeli academic and entrepreneur

- שְׁלֹמֹה בֵּן-חַיִּים
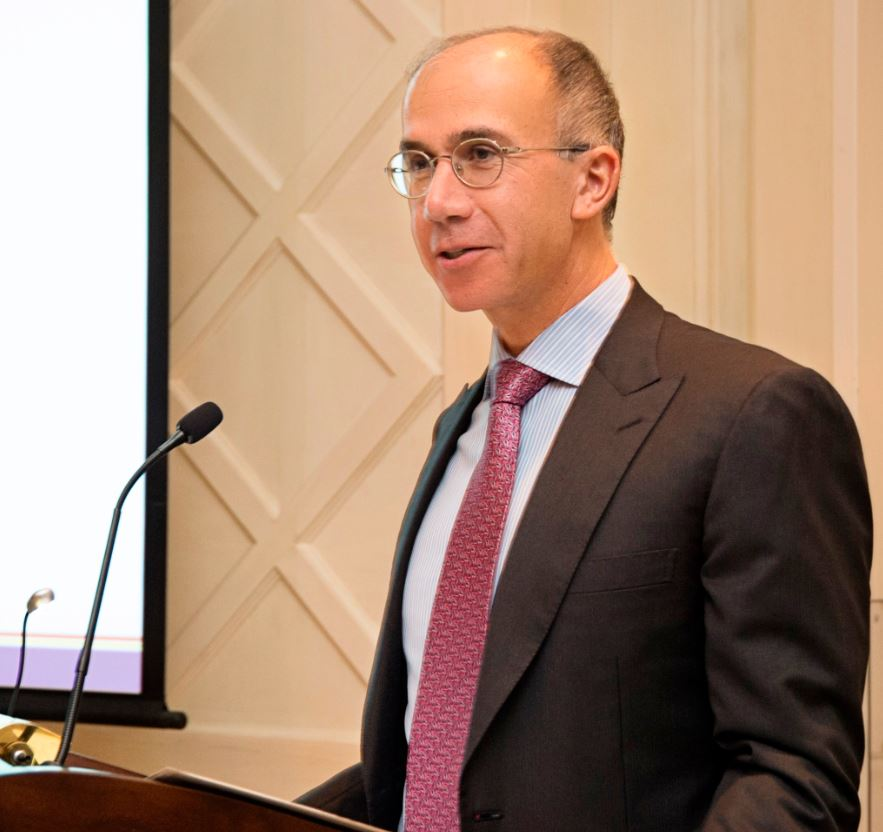
- Born: Israel
- Occupation: Entrepreneur
- Known for: Co-founder of Biosense Inc.
- Relatives: Amit Ben-Haim (brother)

Shlomo Ben-Haim (Hebrew: שְׁלֹמֹה בֵּן-חַיִּים) is an Israeli-born professor of medicine, a serial entrepreneur specializing in the fields of healthcare and biotech, and a philanthropist. He is the co-founder of Biosense Inc., Spectrum Dynamics LLC., Radiancy Inc., X-Technologies, Impulse Dynamics, InStent Inc., Disc-O-Tech Ltd. and EPD Solutions Ltd. He is the inventor of about 560 patents and patent applications.

== Academic appointments ==
Ben-Haim has held faculty positions at both Harvard University and the Technion – Israel Institute of Technology as a professor of medicine, Physiology and Biophysics. He has authored or co-authored about 450 scientific papers in peer-reviewed journals. He held the role of Chief Scientist at Johnson & Johnson's Biosense-Webster.

== Business ventures ==
Ben-Haim founded, co-founded and presided over a number of businesses, mainly in the healthcare and biotech fields. In 1993, he co-founded Biosense Inc with his brother Amit Ben-Haim. (which subsequently merged with Webster to form Biosense-Webster Inc. under Johnson & Johnson). Amit Ben-Haim went on to found failed health wearables brand CloudTag, costing investors millions. In 1996, he co-founded Impulse Dynamics with American entrepreneur Lewis Pell. In 2000 Impulse Dynamics participated in a three-party transaction with Guidant and US-based healthcare company Johnson & Johnson and, in 2005, it was announced that Johnson & Johnson invested $80 million in Impulse Dynamics. Ben-Haim also co-founded Spectrum Dynamics LLC., a company specializing in cardiac molecular imaging. In 2013, the assets of Spectrum Dynamics were acquired by Biosensors International Group, with whom Spectrum Dynamics formed a joint-venture to develop non-cardiac products.

Other companies in the healthcare industry that Ben-Haim has co-founded to date include: InStent Inc. that was merged into Medtronic; Disc-O-Tech Ltd. that was merged into Kyphon which subsequently merged into Medtronic; Radiancy Inc. that was later merged into Photomedex; X-Technologies that was later merged into Guidant which subsequently merged into Boston Scientific; and EPD Solutions that was acquired by Philips. Ben-Haim also co-founded various other medical device and biomedical firms in the fields of cardiology, obesity, diabetes, esthetics and cosmetics, antiviral medications, deep vein thrombosis prevention, therapy for limb ischemia, and post-stroke and sports-injuries rehabilitation. Ben-Haim serves or served as executive chairman of Impulse Dynamics, Spectrum Dynamics LLC. and Motorika Limited.

Ben-Haim is the founder and Chairman of Goji Food Solutions, a company that is developing innovative energy delivery technology. In 2010, ITW invested $50 million into Goji Food Solutions (which was at the time was known as RF Dynamics.)

The companies Ben-Haim founded or co-founded which were subsequently sold or merged generated about US$2 billion as detailed in the table below:

Company	Exit Value (US $ MM)	Acquired By
Biosense Inc.	427	Johnson & Johnson
Disc-O-Tech Ltd.	220	Kyphon (subsequently Medtronic)
Instant Inc.	214	Medtronic
X-Technologies	200	Guidant (subsequently Boston Scientific)
Impulse Dynamics*	125	Johnson & Johnson
Spectrum Dynamics LLC.	51	Biosensors International Group Ltd.
Radiancy Inc.	252	PhotoMedex, Inc.
EPD Solutions Ltd.	537	Philips
Total	2,026	

* the three-way deal between Guidant, Johnson & Johnson and Impulse Dynamics.

== Philanthropy ==
Ben-Haim co-founded Bridge to the Future, a charitable foundation dedicated to improving health and education in underserved communities in Israel. Ben-Haim is a partner in Atidim, a philanthropic organization aiming at lowering social and financial gaps in society in Israel.

In 2014, Ben-Haim gave a multi-million philanthropic gift for the establishment of a new Harvard Medical School (HMS) endowed professorship at HMS's teaching hospital (Beth Israel Deaconess Medical Center) in honor of Mark Josephson, M.D., chief of the Division of Cardiovascular Medicine and director of the Harvard-Thorndike Arrhythmia Institute.

In 2018, Ben-Haim invested in social-impact fintech platform Kaleidofin based in India.

== Awards ==
In 2012, Ben-Haim received an award for his work in Internal Medicine from the Medicine Alumni Society of Iowa. In 2014, he was recognized by the Beth Israel Deaconess Medical Center as "an internationally acclaimed cardiologist who developed new ways to correct life-threatening problems in the electrical system of the human heart."
