= C17H22N4O2 =

The molecular formula C_{17}H_{22}N_{4}O_{2} (molar mass: 314.389 g/mol) may refer to:

- Resiquimod
- Ralmitaront
