= Opioid receptor =

Group of biological receptors

An animated view of the human κ-opioid receptor in complex with the antagonist JDTic.

Opioid receptors are a group of inhibitory G protein-coupled receptors with opioids as ligands. The endogenous opioids are dynorphins, enkephalins, endorphins, endomorphins and nociceptin. Even though at the cellular level they are inhibitory, their activation is not always inhibitory: for example, activation of mu-opioid receptors activates (not inhibits) dopamine release, and activation of kappa-opioid receptors can lead to noradrenaline release, due to the location of these receptors on suppressor-cells releasing these neurotransmitters. The opioid receptors are ~40% identical to somatostatin receptors (SSTRs). Opioid receptors are distributed widely in the brain, in the spinal cord, on peripheral neurons, and digestive tract.

== Discovery ==
By the mid-1960s, it had become apparent from pharmacologic studies that opioids were likely to exert their actions at specific receptor sites, and that there were likely to be multiple such sites. Early studies had indicated that opiates appeared to accumulate in the brain. The receptors were first identified as specific molecules through the use of binding studies, in which opiates that had been labeled with radioisotopes were found to bind to brain membrane homogenates. The first such study was published in 1971, using ^{3}H-levorphanol. In 1973, Candace Pert and Solomon H. Snyder published the first detailed binding study of what would turn out to be the μ opioid receptor, using ^{3}H-naloxone. That study has been widely credited as the first definitive finding of an opioid receptor, although two other studies followed shortly after.

== Purification ==
Purification of the receptor further verified its existence. The first attempt to purify the receptor involved the use of a novel opioid antagonist called chlornaltrexamine that was demonstrated to bind to the opioid receptor. Caruso later purified the detergent-extracted component of rat brain membrane that eluted with the specifically bound ^{3}H-chlornaltrexamine.

== Major subtypes ==
There are four major subtypes of opioid receptors. OGFr was originally discovered and named as a new opioid receptor zeta (ζ). However it was subsequently found that it shares little sequence similarity with the other opioid receptors, and has quite different function.

Receptor	Subtypes	Location	Function	G protein subunit
delta (δ); DOR; OP_{1} ^{(I)}	δ_{1}, δ_{2}	brain; pontine nuclei; amygdala; olfactory bulbs; deep cortex; peripheral sensory neurons	analgesia; antidepressant effects; convulsant effects; physical dependence; may modulate μ-opioid receptor-mediated respiratory depression	Gi
kappa (κ); KOR; OP_{2} ^{(I)}	κ_{1}, κ_{2}, κ_{3}	brain; hypothalamus; periaqueductal grey; claustrum; spinal cord; substantia gelatinosa; peripheral sensory neurons	analgesia; anticonvulsant effects; depression; dissociative/hallucinogenic effects; diuresis; miosis; dysphoria; neuroprotection; sedation; stress	Gi
mu (μ); MOR; OP_{3} ^{(I)}	μ_{1}, μ_{2}, μ_{3}	brain; cortex (laminae III and IV); thalamus; striosomes; periaqueductal grey; rostral ventromedial medulla; spinal cord; substantia gelatinosa; peripheral sensory neurons; intestinal tract	μ_{1}: analgesia; physical dependence; μ_{2}: respiratory depression; miosis; euphoria; reduced GI motility; physical dependence; μ_{3}: possible vasodilation	Gi
Nociceptin receptor NOR; OP_{4} ^{(I)}	ORL_{1}	brain; cortex; amygdala; hippocampus; septal nuclei; habenula; hypothalamus; spinal cord	anxiety; depression; appetite; development of tolerance to μ-opioid agonists	
zeta (ζ); ZOR		heart; liver; skeletal muscle; kidney; brain; pancreas; fetal tissue; liver; kidney	tissue growth; embryonic development; regulation of cancer cell proliferation	

(I). Name based on order of discovery

== Evolution ==
The opioid receptor (OR) family originated from two duplication events of a single ancestral opioid receptor early in vertebrate evolution. Phylogenetic analysis demonstrates that the family of opioid receptors was already present at the origin of jawed vertebrates over 450 million years ago. In humans, this paralogon resulting from a double tetraploidization event resulted in the receptor genes being located on chromosomes 1, 6, 8, and 20. Tetraploidization events often result in the loss of one or more of the duplicated genes, but in this case, nearly all species retain all four opioid receptors, indicating biological significance of these systems. Stefano traced the co-evolution of OR and the immune system underlying the fact that these receptors helped earlier animals to survive pain and inflammation shock in aggressive environments.

The receptor families delta, kappa, and mu demonstrate 55–58% identity to one another, and a 48–49% homology to the nociceptin receptor. Taken together, this indicates that the NOP receptor gene, OPRL1, has equal evolutionary origin, but a higher mutation rate, than the other receptor genes.

Although opioid receptor families share many similarities, their structural differences lead to functional difference. Thus, mu-opioid receptors induce relaxation, trust, satisfaction, and analgesia. This system may also help mediate stable, emotionally committed relationships. Experiments with juvenile guinea pigs showed that social attachment is mediated by the opioid system. The evolutionary role of opioid signalling in these behaviours was confirmed in dogs, chicks, and rats. Opioid receptors also have a role in mating behaviors. However, mu-opioid receptors do not just control social behaviour because they also make individuals feel relaxed in a wide range of other situations.

Kappa- and delta-opioid receptors may be less associated with relaxation and analgesia because kappa-opioid receptor suppresses mu-opioid receptor activation, and delta-opioid receptor interacts differently with agonists and antagonists. Kappa-opioid receptors are involved in chronic anxiety's perceptual mobilization, whereas delta-opioid receptors induce action initiation, impulsivity, and behavioural mobilization. These differences led some researches to suggest that up- or down-regulations within three opioid receptors families are the basis of different dispositional emotionality seen in psychiatric disorders.

Human-specific opioid-modulated cognitive features are not attributable to coding differences for receptors or ligands, which share 99% similarity with primates, but to regulatory changes in expression levels.

== Nomenclature ==
The receptors were named using the first letter of the first ligand that was found to bind to them. Morphine was the first chemical shown to bind to "mu" receptors. The first letter of the drug morphine is m, rendered as the corresponding Greek letter μ. In similar manner, a drug known as ketocyclazocine was first shown to attach itself to "κ" (kappa) receptors, while the "δ" (delta) receptor was named after the mouse vas deferens tissue in which the receptor was first characterized. An additional opioid receptor was later identified and cloned based on homology with the cDNA. This receptor is known as the nociceptin receptor or ORL1 (opiate receptor-like 1).

The opioid receptor types are nearly 70% identical, with the differences located at the N and C termini. The μ receptor is perhaps the most important. It is thought that the G protein binds to the third intracellular loop of all opioid receptors. Both in mice and humans, the genes for the various receptor subtypes are located on separate chromosomes.

Separate opioid receptor subtypes have been identified in human tissue. Research has so far failed to identify the genetic evidence of the subtypes, and it is thought that they arise from post-translational modification of cloned receptor types.

An IUPHAR subcommittee has recommended that appropriate terminology for the 3 classical (μ, δ, κ) receptors, and the non-classical (nociceptin) receptor, should be MOP ("Mu OPiate receptor"), DOP, KOP, and NOP respectively.

== Additional receptors ==
Sigma (σ) receptors were once considered to be opioid receptors due to the antitussive actions of many opioid drugs' being mediated via σ receptors, and the first selective σ agonists being derivatives of opioid drugs (e.g., allylnormetazocine). However, σ receptors were found to not be activated by endogenous opioid peptides, and are quite different from the other opioid receptors in both function and gene sequence, so they are now not usually classified with the opioid receptors.

The existence of further opioid receptors (or receptor subtypes) has also been suggested because of pharmacological evidence of actions produced by endogenous opioid peptides, but shown not to be mediated through any of the four known opioid receptor subtypes. The existence of receptor subtypes or additional receptors other than the classical opioid receptors (μ, δ, κ) has been based on limited evidence, since only three genes for the three main receptors have been identified. The only one of these additional receptors to have been definitively identified is the zeta (ζ) opioid receptor, which has been shown to be a cellular growth factor modulator with met-enkephalin being the endogenous ligand. This receptor is now most commonly referred to as the opioid growth factor receptor (OGFr).

=== Epsilon (ε) opioid receptor ===
Another postulated opioid receptor is the ε opioid receptor. The existence of this receptor was suspected after the endogenous opioid peptide beta-endorphin was shown to produce additional actions that did not seem to be mediated through any of the known opioid receptors. Activation of this receptor produces strong analgesia and release of met-enkephalin; a number of widely used opioid agonists, such as the μ agonist etorphine and the κ agonist bremazocine, have been shown to act as agonists for this effect (even in the presence of antagonists to their more well known targets), while buprenorphine has been shown to act as an epsilon antagonist. Several selective agonists and antagonists are now available for the putative epsilon receptor; however, efforts to locate a gene for this receptor have been unsuccessful, and epsilon-mediated effects were absent in μ/δ/κ "triple knockout" mice, suggesting the epsilon receptor is likely to be either a splice variant derived from alternate post-translational modification, or a heteromer derived from hybridization of two or more of the known opioid receptors.

=== GPR139 ===
GPR139 has been identified as a novel opioid receptor, specifically of dynorphins.

== Mechanism of activation ==
Opioid receptors are a type of G protein–coupled receptor (GPCR). These receptors are distributed throughout the central nervous system and within the peripheral tissue of neural and non-neural origin. They are also located in high concentrations in the periaqueductal grey, locus coeruleus, and the rostral ventromedial medulla. The receptors consist of an extracellular amino acid N-terminus, seven trans-membrane helical loops, three extracellular loops, three intracellular loops, and an intracellular carboxyl C-terminus. Three GPCR extracellular loops provide a compartment where signalling molecules can attach to generate a response. Heterotrimeric G protein contain three different sub-units, which include an alpha (α) subunit, a beta (β) subunit, and a gamma (γ) sub-unit. The gamma and beta sub-units are permanently bound together, producing a single Gβγ sub-unit. Heterotrimeric G proteins act as 'molecular switches', which play a key role in signal transduction, because they relay information from activated receptors to appropriate effector proteins. All G protein α sub-units contain palmitate, which is a 16-carbon saturated fatty acid, that is attached near the N-terminus through a labile, reversible thioester linkage to a cysteine amino acid. It is this palmitoylation that allows the G protein to interact with membrane phospholipids due to the hydrophobic nature of the alpha sub-units. The gamma sub-unit is also lipid modified and can attach to the plasma membrane as well. These properties of the two sub-units, allow the opioid receptor's G protein to permanently interact with the membrane via lipid anchors.

When an agonistic ligand binds to the opioid receptor, a conformational change occurs, and the GDP molecule is released from the Gα sub-unit. This mechanism is complex, and is a major stage of the signal transduction pathway. When the GDP molecule is attached, the Gα sub-unit is in its inactive state, and the nucleotide-binding pocket is closed off inside the protein complex. However, upon ligand binding, the receptor switches to an active conformation, and this is driven by intermolecular rearrangement between the trans-membrane helices. The receptor activation releases an 'ionic lock' which holds together the cytoplasmic sides of transmembrane helices three and six, causing them to rotate. This conformational change exposes the intracellular receptor domains at the cytosolic side, which further leads to the activation of the G protein. When the GDP molecule dissociates from the Gα sub-unit, a GTP molecule binds to the free nucleotide-binding pocket, and the G protein becomes active. A Gα(GTP) complex is formed, which has a weaker affinity for the Gβγ sub-unit than the Gα(GDP) complex, causing the Gα sub-unit to separate from the Gβγ sub-unit, forming two sections of the G protein. The sub-units are now free to interact with effector proteins; however, they are still attached to the plasma membrane by lipid anchors. After binding, the active G protein sub-units diffuses within the membrane and acts on various intracellular effector pathways. This includes inhibiting neuronal adenylate cyclase activity, as well as increasing membrane hyper-polarization. When the adenylyl cyclase enzyme complex is stimulated, it results in the formation of cyclic adenosine 3', 5'-monophosphate (cAMP), from adenosine 5' triphosphate (ATP). cAMP acts as a secondary messenger, as it moves from the plasma membrane into the cell and relays the signal.

cAMP binds to, and activates cAMP-dependent protein kinase A (PKA), which is located intracellularly in the neuron. The PKA consists of a holoenzyme – it is a compound which becomes active due to the combination of an enzyme with a coenzyme. The PKA enzyme also contains two catalytic PKS-Cα subunits, and a regulator PKA-R subunit dimer. The PKA holoenzyme is inactive under normal conditions, however, when cAMP molecules that are produced earlier in the signal transduction mechanism combine with the enzyme, PKA undergoes a conformational change. This activates it, giving it the ability to catalyse substrate phosphorylation. CREB (cAMP response element binding protein) belongs to a family of transcription factors and is positioned in the nucleus of the neuron. When the PKA is activated, it phosphorylates the CREB protein (adds a high energy phosphate group) and activates it. The CREB protein binds to cAMP response elements CRE, and can either increase or decrease the transcription of certain genes. The cAMP/PKA/CREB signalling pathway described above is crucial in memory formation and pain modulation. It is also significant in the induction and maintenance of long-term potentiation, which is a phenomenon that underlies synaptic plasticity – the ability of synapses to strengthen or weaken over time.

Voltage-gated dependent calcium channel, (VDCCs), are key in the depolarization of neurons, and play a major role in promoting the release of neurotransmitters. When agonists bind to opioid receptors, G proteins activate and dissociate into their constituent Gα and Gβγ sub-units. The Gβγ sub-unit binds to the intracellular loop between the two trans-membrane helices of the VDCC. When the sub-unit binds to the voltage-dependent calcium channel, it produces a voltage-dependent block, which inhibits the channel, preventing the flow of calcium ions into the neuron. Embedded in the cell membrane is also the G protein-coupled inwardly-rectifying potassium channel. When a Gβγ or Gα(GTP) molecule binds to the C-terminus of the potassium channel, it becomes active, and potassium ions are pumped out of the neuron. The activation of the potassium channel and subsequent deactivation of the calcium channel causes membrane hyperpolarization. This is when there is a change in the membrane's potential, so that it becomes more negative. The reduction in calcium ions causes a reduction neurotransmitter release because calcium is essential for this event to occur. This means that neurotransmitters such as glutamate and substance P cannot be released from the presynaptic terminal of the neurons. These neurotransmitters are vital in the transmission of pain, so opioid receptor activation reduces the release of these substances, thus creating a strong analgesic effect.

== Pathology ==
Some forms of mutations in δ-opioid receptors have resulted in constant receptor activation.

== Protein–protein interactions ==
=== Receptor heteromers ===
- δ-κ
- δ-μ
- κ-μ
- μ-ORL1
- δ-CB1
- μ-CB1
- κ-CB1
- δ-α2A
- δ-β2
- κ-β2
- μ-α2A
- δ-CXCR4
- δ-SNSR4
- κ-APJ
- μ-CCR5
- μ1D-GRPR
- μ-mGlu5
- μ-5-HT1A
- μ-NK1
- μ-sst2A

== See also ==
- List of opioids
- Opioid antagonist
- Opioidergic
