= Ridaforolimus =

Chemical compound

Clinical data
- ATC code: L01EG03 (WHO)

Identifiers
- IUPAC name: (1R,2R,4S)-4-[(2R)-2-[(1R,9S,12S,15R,16E,18R,19R,21R,23S,24E,26E,28Z,30S,32S,35R)-1,18-dihydroxy-19,30-dimethoxy-15,17,21,23,29,35-hexamethyl-2,3,10,14,20-pentaoxo-11,36-dioxa-4-azatricyclo[30.3.1.0^{4,9}]hexatriaconta-16,24,26,28-tetraen-12-yl]propyl]-2-methoxycyclohexyl dimethylphosphinate
- CAS Number: 572924-54-0
- PubChem CID: 11520894
- IUPHAR/BPS: 7884
- ChemSpider: 24597928
- UNII: 48Z35KB15K
- ChEBI: CHEBI:82677
- ChEMBL: ChEMBL2103804
- CompTox Dashboard (EPA): DTXSID001025942
- ECHA InfoCard: 100.207.749

Chemical and physical data
- Formula: C_{53}H_{84}NO_{14}P
- Molar mass: 990.222 g·mol^{−1}
- 3D model (JSmol): Interactive image
- SMILES: CC1CCC2CC(/C(=C/C=C/C=C/C(CC(C(=O)C(C(/C(=C/C(C(=O)CC(OC(=O)C3CCCCN3C(=O)C(=O)C1(O2)O)C(C)CC4CCC(C(C4)OC)OP(=O)(C)C)C)/C)O)OC)C)C)/C)OC
- InChI: InChI=1S/C53H84NO14P/c1-32-18-14-13-15-19-33(2)44(63-8)30-40-23-21-38(7)53(61,67-40)50(58)51(59)54-25-17-16-20-41(54)52(60)66-45(35(4)28-39-22-24-43(46(29-39)64-9)68-69(11,12)62)31-42(55)34(3)27-37(6)48(57)49(65-10)47(56)36(5)26-32/h13-15,18-19,27,32,34-36,38-41,43-46,48-49,57,61H,16-17,20-26,28-31H2,1-12H3/b15-13+,18-14+,33-19+,37-27+/t32-,34-,35-,36-,38-,39+,40+,41+,43-,44+,45+,46-,48-,49+,53-/m1/s1; Key:BUROJSBIWGDYCN-GAUTUEMISA-N

Ridaforolimus (also known as AP23573 and MK-8669; formerly known as deforolimus) is an investigational targeted and small-molecule inhibitor of the protein mTOR, a protein that acts as a central regulator of protein synthesis, cell proliferation, cell cycle progression and cell survival, integrating signals from proteins, such as PI3K, AKT and PTEN known to be important to malignancy. Blocking mTOR creates a starvation-like effect in cancer cells by interfering with cell growth, division, metabolism, and angiogenesis.

It has had promising results in a clinical trial for advanced soft tissue and bone sarcoma.

== Commercial arrangements ==
Ridaforolimus is being co-developed by Merck and ARIAD Pharmaceuticals. On May 5, 2010, Ariad Pharmaceuticals and Merck & Company announced a clinical development and marketing agreement. With this agreement, Ariad received $125 million in upfront payments from Merck and $53 million in milestone payments. Future payments are triggered upon acceptance of the NDA by the FDA with another payment when the drug receives marketing approval. There are similar milestones for acceptance and approval in both Europe and Japan. Other milestone payments are tied to revenue goals for the drug. ARIAD has opted to co-promote ridaforolimus in the U.S. Merck plans to submit a New Drug Application (NDA) for ridaforolimus to the U.S. Food and Drug Administration (FDA) and a marketing application in the European Union in 2011. After formal rejection by the FDA in June 2012 ARIAD/MSD decided to withdraw their EMA application for Ridaforolimus in November 2012.

== Clinical trials ==
=== Phase III SUCCEED ===
On June 6, 2011, Ariad and Merck announced detailed results from the largest randomized study ever in the soft tissue and bone sarcoma population, the Phase III SUCCEED clinical trial. SUCCEED evaluated oral ridaforolimus, in patients with metastatic soft-tissue or bone sarcomas who previously had a favorable response to chemotherapy. In this patient population, ridaforolimus improved progression-free survival (PFS) compared to placebo, the primary endpoint of the study. The complete study results were presented by Sant P. Chawla, M.D., director, Sarcoma Oncology Center, Santa Monica, CA, during the 2011 American Society of Clinical Oncology (ASCO) annual meeting.
The SUCCEED (Sarcoma Multi-Center Clinical Evaluation of the Efficacy of Ridaforolimus) trial was a randomized (1:1), placebo-controlled, double-blind study of oral ridaforolimus administered at 40 mg/day (five of seven days per week) in patients with metastatic soft-tissue or bone sarcomas who previously had a favorable response to chemotherapy. Oral ridaforolimus was granted a Special Protocol Assessment (SPA) by the FDA for the SUCCEED trial.
Based on 552 progression-free survival (PFS) events in 711 patients, (ridaforolimus (N=347), placebo (N=364) determined by an independent radiological review committee, the study achieved its primary endpoint of improvement in PFS, with a statistically significant (p=0.0001) 28 percent reduction in the risk of progression or death observed in those treated with ridaforolimus compared to placebo (hazard ratio=0.72). Median PFS was 17.7 weeks for those treated with ridaforolimus compared to 14.6 weeks in the placebo group. Furthermore, based on the full analysis of PFS determined by investigator assessment, there was a statistically significant (p<0.0001) 31 percent reduction by ridaforolimus in the risk of progression or death compared to placebo (hazard ratio=0.69). In the investigator assessment analysis, median PFS was 22.4 weeks for those treated with ridaforolimus compared to 14.7 weeks in the placebo group

== See also ==
- Discovery and development of mTOR inhibitors
