= OGFr =

Protein

OGFR

Identifiers
- Aliases: OGFR, OGFr, opioid growth factor receptor
- External IDs: OMIM: 606459; MGI: 1919325; GeneCards: OGFR

Gene location (Human)
Chr.	Chromosome 20 (human)
Band	20q13.33	Start	62,804,835 bp
Band	20q13.33	End	62,814,000 bp

Gene location (Mouse)
Chr.	Chromosome 2 (mouse)
Band	2|2 H4	Start	180,231,038 bp
Band	2|2 H4	End	180,237,629 bp
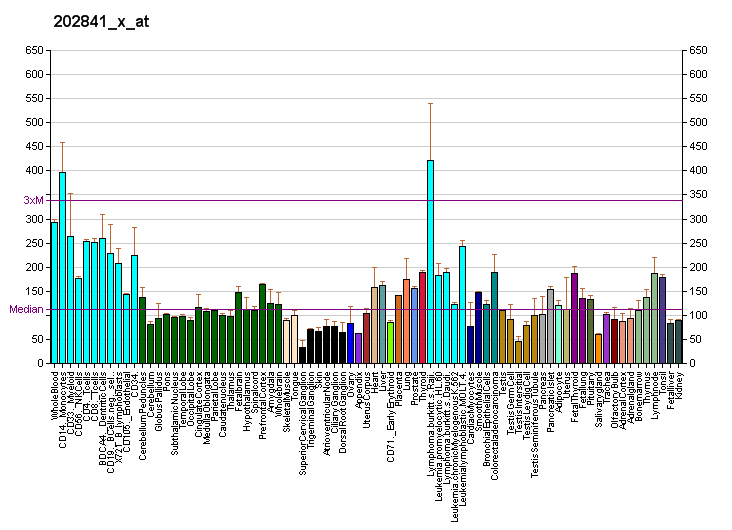

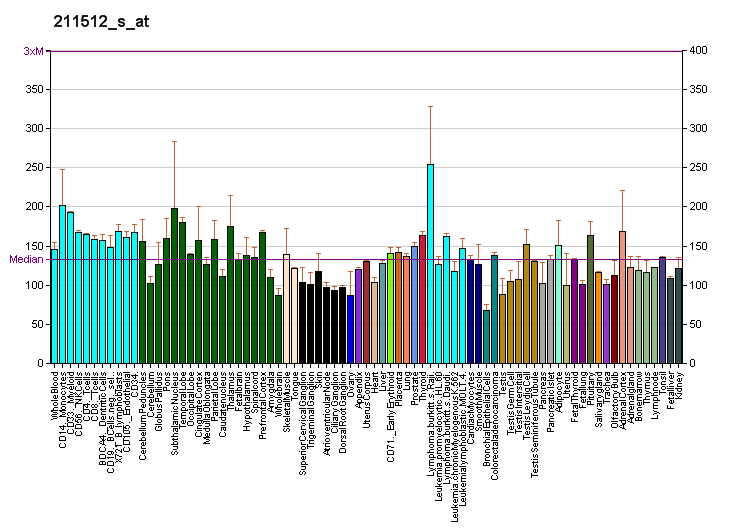

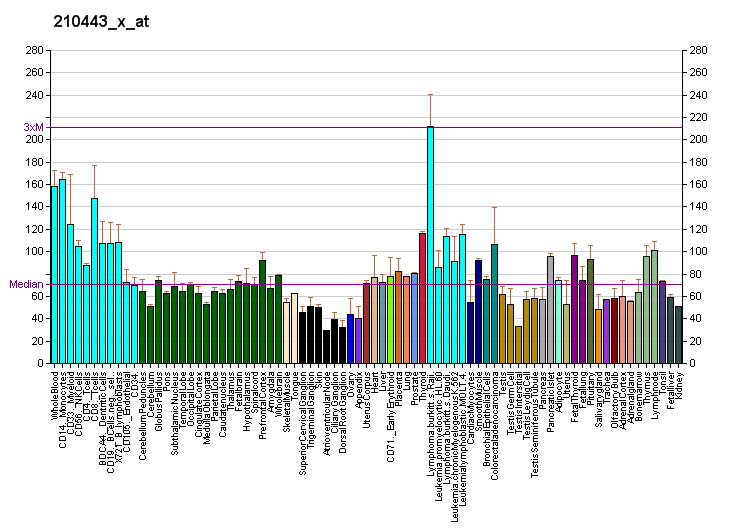
RNA expression pattern
Bgee	Human / Mouse (ortholog); Top expressed in: granulocyte; monocyte; sural nerve; right frontal lobe; right lobe of liver; spleen; right lung; right uterine tube; cingulate gyrus; olfactory zone of nasal mucosa / Top expressed in: yolk sac; granulocyte; ventricular zone; mandibular prominence; maxillary prominence; thymus; internal carotid artery; ganglionic eminence; mesenteric lymph nodes; neural layer of retina; More reference expression data
BioGPS	More reference expression data
Gene ontology
Molecular function	protein binding; G protein-coupled opioid receptor activity; signaling receptor activity
Cellular component	membrane; cytoplasm; nucleus; cellular component
Biological process	regulation of growth; regulation of cell growth; G protein-coupled opioid receptor signaling pathway; signal transduction
Sources:Amigo / QuickGO
Orthologs
Databases	NCBI: entry; OMA: entry
Species	Human	Mouse
Entrez	11054	72075
Ensembl	ENSG00000060491	ENSMUSG00000049401
UniProt	Q9NZT2	Q99PG2
RefSeq (mRNA)	NM_007346	NM_031373
RefSeq (protein)	NP_031372	NP_113550
Location (UCSC)	Chr 20: 62.8 – 62.81 Mb	Chr 2: 180.23 – 180.24 Mb
PubMed search
- Wikidata
View/Edit Human	View/Edit Mouse

Opioid growth factor receptor (OGFr) conserved region

Identifiers
- Symbol: OGFr_N
- Pfam: PF04664
- InterPro: IPR006757
Available protein structures:
- PDB: IPR006757 PF04664 (ECOD; PDBsum)
- AlphaFold: IPR006757; PF04664

Opioid growth factor receptor repeat

Identifiers
- Symbol: OGFr_III
- Pfam: PF04680
- InterPro: IPR006770
Available protein structures:
- PDB: IPR006770 PF04680 (ECOD; PDBsum)
- AlphaFold: IPR006770; PF04680

Opioid growth factor receptor, also known as OGFr or the ζ-opioid receptor, is a protein which in humans is encoded by the OGFR gene. The protein encoded by this gene is a receptor for opioid growth factor (OGF), also known as [Met(5)]-enkephalin. The endogenous ligand is thus a known opioid peptide, and OGFr was originally discovered and named as a new opioid receptor zeta (ζ). However it was subsequently found that it shares little sequence similarity with the other opioid receptors, and has quite different function.

== Function ==
The natural function of this receptor appears to be in regulation of tissue growth, and it has been shown to be important in embryonic development, wound repair, and certain forms of cancer.

OGF is a negative regulator of cell proliferation and tissue organization in a variety of processes. The encoded unbound receptor for OGF has been localized to the outer nuclear envelope, where it binds OGF and is translocated into the nucleus. The coding sequence of this gene contains a polymorphic region of 60 nt tandem imperfect repeat units. Several transcripts containing between zero and eight repeat units have been reported.

== Mechanism of activation ==
The opioid growth factor receptor consists of a chain of 677 amino acids, which includes a nuclear localization sequence region. When OGF binds to the receptor, an OGF-OGFr complex is formed, which leads to the increase in the synthesis of the selective cyclin-dependent kinase (CDK) inhibitor proteins, p12 and p16. Retinoblastoma protein becomes inactivated through phosphorylation by CDKs, and leads to the progression of the cell cycle from the G1 phase to the S phase. Because the activation of the OGF receptor, blocks the phosphorylation of retinoblastoma proteins, retardation of the G_{1} phase occurs, which prevents the cell from further dividing.

== Therapeutic applications ==
Upregulation of OGFr and consequent stimulation of the OGF-OGFr system are important for the anti-proliferative effects of imidazoquinoline drugs like imiquimod and resiquimod, which are immune response modifiers with potent antiviral and antitumour effects, used as topical creams for the treatment of skin cancers and warts.

== Structure ==
OGF contains a conserved N-terminal domain followed by a series of imperfect repeats.
