= Temsirolimus =

Chemical compound

Clinical data
- Trade names: Torisel
- Other names: CCI-779
- AHFS/Drugs.com: Monograph
- MedlinePlus: a607071
- License data: EU EMA: by INN; US DailyMed: Temsirolimus; US FDA: Torisel
- Pregnancy category: AU: D
- Routes of administration: Intravenous
- ATC code: L01EG01 (WHO)

Legal status
- Legal status: AU: S4 (Prescription only); CA: ℞-only; UK: POM (Prescription only); US: ℞-only; EU: Rx-only

Pharmacokinetic data
- Metabolism: Liver
- Elimination half-life: 17.3 hours (temsirolimus); 54.6 hours (sirolimus)
- Excretion: Urine (4.6%), faeces (78%)

Identifiers
- IUPAC name: (1R,2R,4S)-4-{(2R)-2-[(3S,6R,7E,9R,10R,12R,14S,15E,17E,19E,21S,23S,26R,27R,34aS)-9,27-dihydroxy-10,21-dimethoxy-6,8,12,14,20,26-hexamethyl-1,5,11,28,29-pentaoxo-1,4,5,6,9,10,11,12,13,14,21,22,23,24,25,26,27,28,29,31,32,33,34,34a-tetracosahydro-3H-23,27-epoxypyrido[2,1-c][1,4]oxazacyclohentriacontin-3-yl]propyl}-2-methoxycyclohexyl 3-hydroxy-2-(hydroxymethyl)-2-methylpropanoate
- CAS Number: 162635-04-3
- PubChem CID: 6918289
- IUPHAR/BPS: 5892
- DrugBank: DB06287
- ChemSpider: 21468899
- UNII: 624KN6GM2T
- KEGG: D06068
- ChEMBL: ChEMBL1201182
- CompTox Dashboard (EPA): DTXSID2040945
- ECHA InfoCard: 100.211.882

Chemical and physical data
- Formula: C_{56}H_{87}NO_{16}
- Molar mass: 1030.303 g·mol^{−1}

Temsirolimus, sold under the brand name Torisel, is an intravenous drug for the treatment of renal cell carcinoma (RCC), developed by Wyeth Pharmaceuticals and approved by the U.S. Food and Drug Administration (FDA) in May 2007, and was also approved by the European Medicines Agency (EMA) in November 2007. It is a derivative and prodrug of sirolimus.

== Mechanism of action ==
Temsirolimus is a specific inhibitor of mTOR and interferes with the synthesis of proteins that regulate proliferation, growth, and survival of tumor cells. Though temsirolimus shows activity on its own, it is also known to be converted to sirolimus (rapamycin) in vivo; therefore, its activity may be more attributed to its metabolite rather than the prodrug itself (despite claims to the contrary by the manufacturer). Treatment with temsirolimus leads to cell cycle arrest in the G1 phase, and also inhibits tumor angiogenesis by reducing synthesis of VEGF.

mTOR (mammalian target of rapamycin) is a kinase enzyme inside the cell that collects and interprets the numerous and varied growth and survival signals received by tumor cells. When the kinase activity of mTOR is activated, its downstream effectors, the synthesis of cell cycle proteins such as cyclin D and hypoxia-inducible factor-1a (HIF-1a) are increased. HIF-1a then stimulates VEGF. Whether or not mTOR kinase is activated, determines whether the tumor cell produces key proteins needed for proliferation, growth, survival, and angiogenesis.

mTOR is activated in tumor cells by various mechanisms including growth factor surface receptor tyrosine kinases, oncogenes, and loss of tumor suppressor genes. These activating factors are known to be important for malignant transformation and progression. mTOR is particularly important in the biology of renal cancer (RCC) owing to its function in regulating HIF-1a levels. Mutation or loss of the von Hippel Lindau tumor-suppressor gene is common in RCC and is manifested by reduced degradation of HIF-1a. In RCC tumors, activated mTOR further exacerbates accumulation of HIF-1a by increasing synthesis of this transcription factor and its angiogenic target gene products.

== Efficacy ==
In an international three-arm phase III study with 626 previously untreated, poor-prognosis patients, temsirolimus, interferon-α and the combination of both agents was compared. Median overall survival improved significantly in the temsirolimus group (10.9 months) compared with interferon-α group (7.3 months) and the combination group (8.4 months). Further studies are needed to determine the role of temsirolimus in the first-line treatment of patients with a more favorable prognosis, how it can be combined with other targeted agents and as sequential therapy with sunitinib or sorafenib.

== Adverse reactions ==
The toxicity profile is based on what was found in the phase III trial.

- adverse reaction
  - fatigue
  - skin rash
  - mucositis
- hematologic abnormalities
  - hemoglobin decreased
  - lymphocytes decreased
- laboratory abnormalities
  - triglycerides increased
  - glucose increased
  - phosphorus decreased

Temsirolimus has been generally well tolerated in clinical settings by patients with advanced RCC. In patients with RCC, the adverse effect profile of temsirolimus is primarily metabolic in nature, with minimal impact on QoL compared with the commonly seen side-effects with oral multikinase inhibitors. Temsirolimus' high level of specificity for mTOR likely contributes to the tolerability of temsirolimus. However, temsirolimus increases mortality in cancer patients.

== Toxicity to lungs ==
Temsirolimus is associated with pulmonary toxicity, and the risk of developing this complication may be increased among subjects with abnormal pre-treatment pulmonary functions or history of lung disease. The risk of interstitial lung disease is increased with temsirolimus doses greater than 25 mg, symptoms of which may include dry cough, fever, eosinophilia, chest pain, and dyspnea on exertion. Toxicity usually occurred early (within days to weeks) or late (months to years) after treatment.

== Dosing ==
Although infusion reactions can occur while temsirolimus is being administered, most hypersensitivity reactions occurring on the same day as temsirolimus administration were not severe. Antihistamine pretreatment (e.g. 25–50 mg diphenhydramine, 30 minutes prior to administration) is recommended to minimize the risk of an allergic reaction.

== See also ==
- Discovery and development of mTOR inhibitors
