= Rapalink-1 =

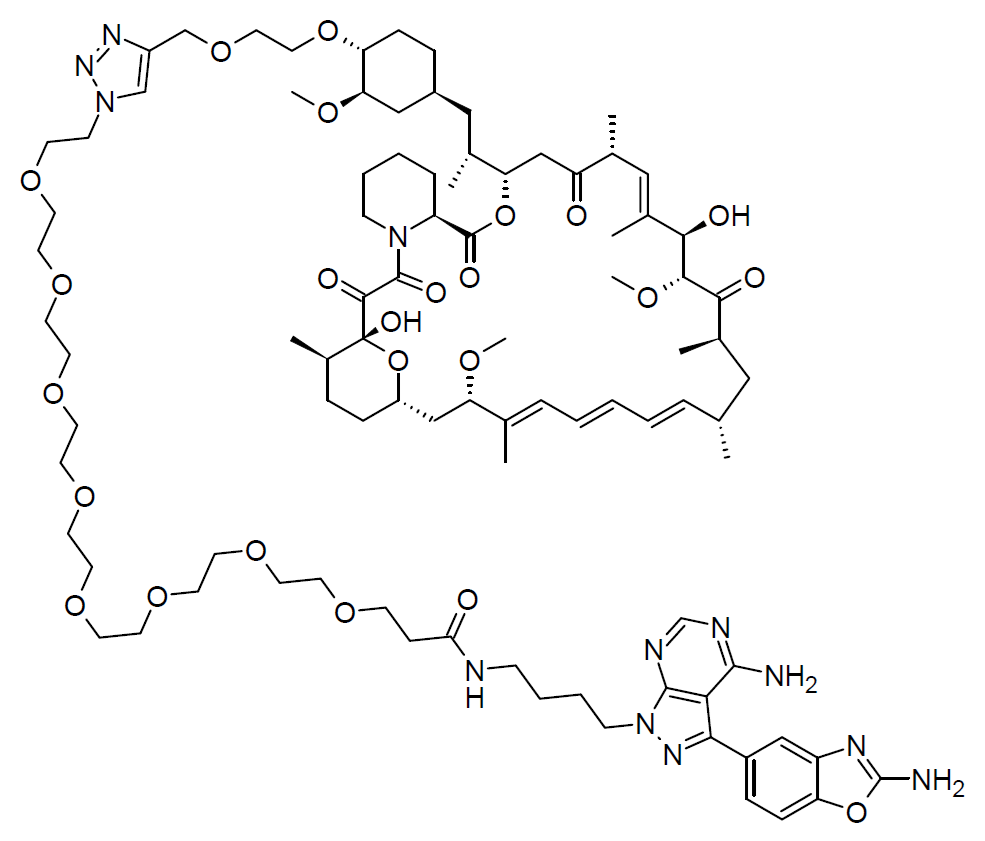

Identifiers
- IUPAC name: N-[4-[4-amino-3-(2-amino-1,3-benzoxazol-5-yl)pyrazolo[3,4-d]pyrimidin-1-yl]butyl]-3-[2-[2-[2-[2-[2-[2-[2-[2-[4-[2-[(1R,2R,4S)-4-[(2R)-2-[(1R,9S,12S,15R,16E,18R,19R,21R,23S,24E,26E,28E,30S,32S,35R)-1,18-dihydroxy-19,30-dimethoxy-15,17,21,23,29,35-hexamethyl-2,3,10,14,20-pentaoxo-11,36-dioxa-4-azatricyclo[30.3.1.0^{4,9}]hexatriaconta-16,24,26,28-tetraen-12-yl]propyl]-2-methoxycyclohexyl]oxyethoxymethyl]triazol-1-yl]ethoxy]ethoxy]ethoxy]ethoxy]ethoxy]ethoxy]ethoxy]ethoxy]propanamide
- PubChem CID: 130375753
- ChemSpider: 82963397

Chemical and physical data
- Formula: C_{91}H_{138}N_{12}O_{24}
- Molar mass: 1784.165 g·mol^{−1}
- 3D model (JSmol): Interactive image
- SMILES: C[C@@H]1CC[C@H]2C[C@@H](/C(=C/C=C/C=C/[C@H](C[C@H](C(=O)[C@@H]([C@@H](/C(=C/[C@H](C(=O)C[C@H](OC(=O)[C@@H]3CCCCN3C(=O)C(=O)[C@@]1(O2)O)[C@H](C)C[C@@H]4CC[C@H]([C@@H](C4)OC)OCCOCC5=CN(N=N5)CCOCCOCCOCCOCCOCCOCCOCCOCCC(=O)NCCCCN6C7=NC=NC(=C7C(=N6)C8=CC9=C(C=C8)OC(=N9)N)N)C)/C)O)OC)C)C)/C)OC
- InChI: InChI=1S/C91H138N12O24/c1-60-18-12-11-13-19-61(2)76(112-8)55-70-24-21-66(7)91(111,127-70)85(108)88(109)102-29-16-14-20-72(102)89(110)125-77(56-73(104)62(3)51-65(6)83(107)84(114-10)82(106)64(5)50-60)63(4)52-67-22-25-75(78(53-67)113-9)124-49-48-123-58-69-57-101(100-98-69)31-33-116-35-37-118-39-41-120-43-45-122-47-46-121-44-42-119-40-38-117-36-34-115-32-27-79(105)94-28-15-17-30-103-87-80(86(92)95-59-96-87)81(99-103)68-23-26-74-71(54-68)97-90(93)126-74/h11-13,18-19,23,26,51,54,57,59-60,62-64,66-67,70,72,75-78,83-84,107,111H,14-17,20-22,24-25,27-50,52-53,55-56,58H2,1-10H3,(H2,93,97)(H,94,105)(H2,92,95,96)/b13-11+,18-12+,61-19+,65-51+/t60-,62-,63-,64-,66-,67+,70+,72+,75-,76+,77+,78-,83-,84+,91-/m1/s1; Key:QDOGZMBPRITPMZ-XIQIGJHASA-N

Rapalink-1 is a drug which acts as an inhibitor of the enzyme mechanistic target of rapamycin (mTOR). It is a dimeric molecule consisting of rapamycin joined to a desalkyl derivative of sapanisertib by a linker group. Since both of these products inhibit mTOR but through action at distinct binding sites on the mTOR complex, it exhibits a dual mTOR inhibitory activity and has been suggested for applications as an anti-aging drug or for treatment of some forms of cancer.

Rapalink-1 is synthesized using click chemistry, specifically through a copper-catalyzed azide-alkyne cycloaddition to join rapamycin and sapanisertib, an mTOR active-site inhibitor via a polyethylene glycol linker.
