= Sapanisertib =

Chemical compound

Identifiers
- IUPAC name: 5-(4-Amino-1-propan-2-ylpyrazolo[3,4-d]pyrimidin-3-yl)-1,3-benzoxazol-2-amine
- CAS Number: 1224844-38-5
- PubChem CID: 45375953
- DrugBank: DB11836
- ChemSpider: 28189069
- UNII: JGH0DF1U03
- KEGG: D11183
- ChEBI: CHEBI:91450
- ChEMBL: ChEMBL3545097
- CompTox Dashboard (EPA): DTXSID401022538

Chemical and physical data
- Formula: C_{15}H_{15}N_{7}O
- Molar mass: 309.333 g·mol^{−1}
- 3D model (JSmol): Interactive image
- SMILES: CC(C)N1C2=C(C(=N1)C3=CC4=C(C=C3)OC(=N4)N)C(=NC=N2)N
- InChI: InChI=1S/C15H15N7O/c1-7(2)22-14-11(13(16)18-6-19-14)12(21-22)8-3-4-10-9(5-8)20-15(17)23-10/h3-7H,1-2H3,(H2,17,20)(H2,16,18,19); Key:GYLDXIAOMVERTK-UHFFFAOYSA-N

Sapanisertib (also known as MLN0128, INK128 and TAK-228) is an experimental small molecule inhibitor of mTOR which is administered orally. It targets both mTORC1 and mTORC2.

Developed by Millennium Pharmaceuticals, and is in phase II clinical trials for breast cancer, endometrial cancer, glioblastoma, renal cell carcinoma, and thyroid cancer. The drug has been well tolerated by patients with advanced solid tumours in Phase I trials.
