= MRGPRX1 =

Protein-coding gene in the species Homo sapiens

Identifiers
- Aliases: MRGPRX1, GPCR, MGRG2, MRGX1, SNSR4, MAS related GPR family member X1
- External IDs: OMIM: 607227; MGI: 2441674; GeneCards: MRGPRX1

Gene location (Human)
Chr.	Chromosome 11 (human)
Band	11p15.1|11	Start	18,933,499 bp
Band	11p15.1|11	End	18,939,414 bp

Gene location (Mouse)
Chr.	Chromosome 7 (mouse)
Band	7|7 B4	Start	48,200,713 bp
Band	7|7 B4	End	48,207,834 bp
RNA expression pattern
Bgee	Human / Mouse (ortholog); Top expressed in: gonad; lower lobe of lung; skin of thigh; skin of hip; liver; canal of the cervix; skin of abdomen / Top expressed in: zone of skin; lip; muscle of thigh; white adipose tissue; urinary bladder; esophagus; quadriceps femoris muscle; More reference expression data
BioGPS	n/a
Gene ontology
Molecular function	signal transducer activity; G protein-coupled receptor activity; transmembrane signaling receptor activity
Cellular component	plasma membrane; membrane; integral component of membrane; integral component of plasma membrane; cell surface
Biological process	acute-phase response; G protein-coupled receptor signaling pathway; signal transduction; cell surface receptor signaling pathway; response to chloroquine
Sources:Amigo / QuickGO
Orthologs
Databases	NCBI: entry; OMA: entry
Species	Human	Mouse
Entrez	259249	243979
Ensembl	ENSG00000170255	ENSMUSG00000050425
UniProt	Q96LB2	Q3KNA1
RefSeq (mRNA)	NM_147199; NM_001393578	NM_175531
RefSeq (protein)	NP_671732	NP_780740
Location (UCSC)	Chr 11: 18.93 – 18.94 Mb	Chr 7: 48.2 – 48.21 Mb
PubMed search
- Wikidata
View/Edit Human	View/Edit Mouse

Mas-related G-protein coupled receptor member X1 is a protein that in humans is encoded by the MRGPRX1 gene.

== See also ==
- MAS1 oncogene
