= Dactolisib =

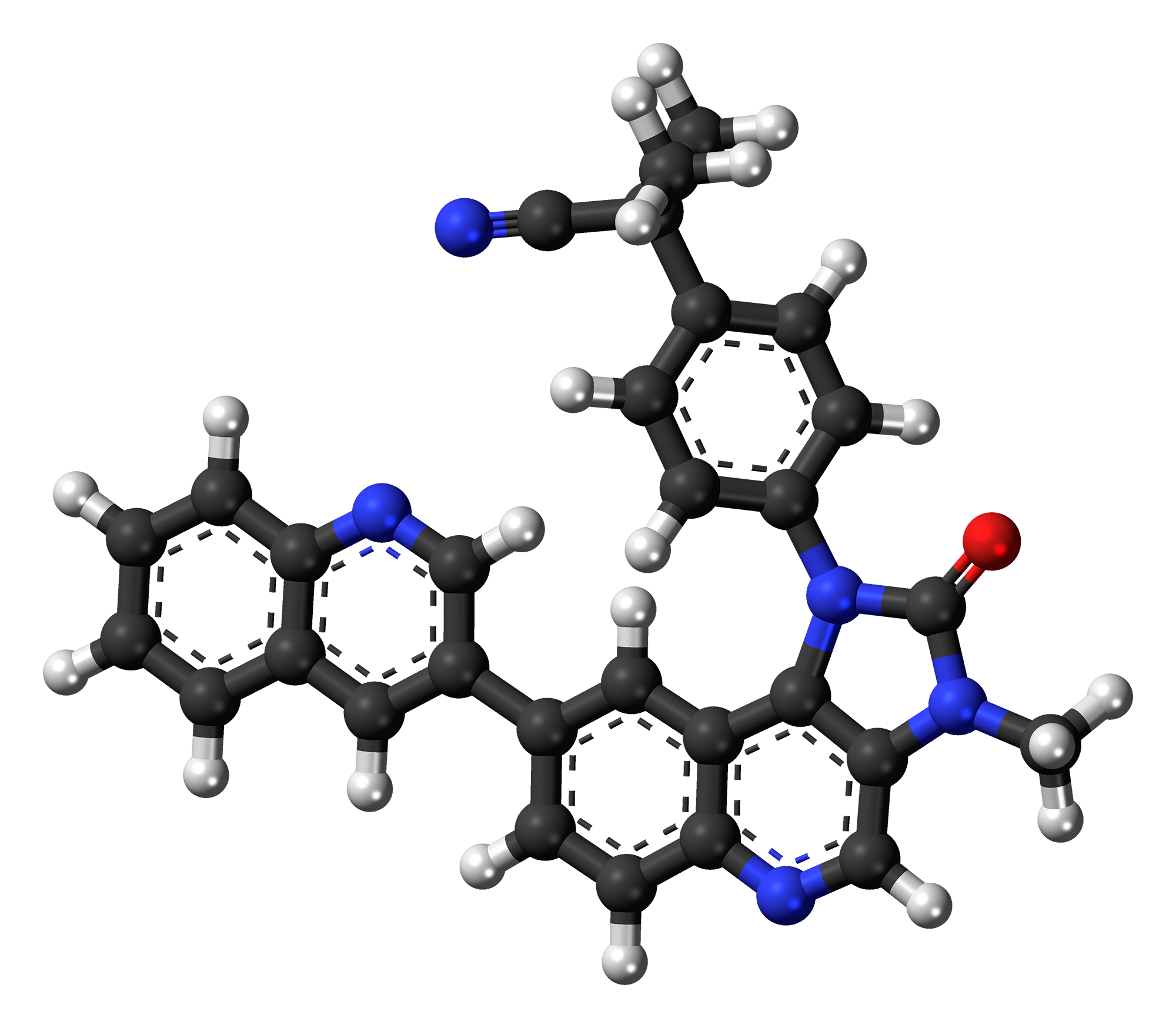

Names
- Preferred IUPAC name 2-Methyl-2-{4-[3-methyl-2-oxo-8-(quinolin-3-yl)-2,3-dihydro-1H-imidazo[4,5-c]quinolin-1-yl]phenyl}propanenitrile
- Other names NVP-BEZ235; BEZ-235; RTB101

Identifiers
CAS Number	915019-65-7
3D model (JSmol)	Interactive image
ChEMBL	ChEMBL1879463
ChemSpider	10151099
IUPHAR/BPS	7950
KEGG	D10552
PubChem CID	11977753
UNII	RUJ6Z9Y0DT
CompTox Dashboard (EPA)	DTXSID10238599
- InChI: InChI=1S/C30H23N5O/c1-30(2,18-31)22-9-11-23(12-10-22)35-28-24-15-19(21-14-20-6-4-5-7-25(20)32-16-21)8-13-26(24)33-17-27(28)34(3)29(35)36/h4-17H,1-3H3 Key: JOGKUKXHTYWRGZ-UHFFFAOYSA-N
- SMILES: N#CC(c6ccc(N5c4c(cnc3ccc(c1cc2ccccc2nc1)cc34)N(C5=O)C)cc6)(C)C

Properties
Chemical formula	C_{30}H_{23}N_{5}O
Molar mass	469.548 g·mol^{−1}
- Except where otherwise noted, data are given for materials in their standard state (at 25 °C [77 °F], 100 kPa). verify (what is ?) Infobox references

Dactolisib (codenamed NVP-BEZ235 and BEZ-235, also known as RTB101) is an imidazoquinoline derivative acting as a PI3K inhibitor. It also inhibits mTOR. It is being investigated as a possible cancer treatment.

It has been shown to be toxic to Waldenström's macroglobulinemia cells.

It was the first PI3K inhibitor to enter clinical trials, in 2006.

A phase IB/II clinical trial for locally advanced or metastatic HER2 negative breast cancer has completed.

A phase II clinical trial for advanced pancreatic neuroendocrine tumors (pNET) had initially reported results, but was later terminated because insufficient normal tissue tolerance to the drug. A phase I clinical trial of BEZ235 in patients with advanced renal cell carcinoma had to be terminated prematurely due to toxicity and a lack of clinical efficacy . Another Phase Ib study on patients with various solid cancers found severe normal tissue toxicity as well when BEZ235/Dactolisib was administered in combination with the mTOR inhibitor Everolimus. The authors concluded that the combination of both drugs demonstrated limited efficacy and tolerance. BEZ235 systemic exposure increased in a dose-proportional manner while oral bioavailability was quite low, which may be related to gastrointestinal-specific toxicity . A phase I study of BEZ-235 to treat acute lymphoid leukaemia was initiated in 2012, but no results were published since then.

A phase 2a randomized, placebo-controlled clinical trial published in 2018 showed that everolimus in combination with dactolisib decreased the rate of reported infections in an elderly population.
