= Gardiquimod =

Chemical compound

Identifiers
- IUPAC name: 1-(4-Amino-2-((ethylamino)methyl)-1H-imidazo[4,5-c]quinolin-1-yl)-2-methylpropan-2-ol
- CAS Number: 1020412-43-4; trifluoroacetate: 1159840-61-5
- PubChem CID: 44592366
- ChemSpider: 24665048
- UNII: Y3W4QVW5BY; trifluoroacetate: 4Y6M4HJ0WU
- ChEBI: CHEBI:234430
- ChEMBL: ChEMBL1085742
- CompTox Dashboard (EPA): DTXSID801032731
- ECHA InfoCard: 100.233.311

Chemical and physical data
- Formula: C_{17}H_{23}N_{5}O
- Molar mass: 313.405 g·mol^{−1}
- 3D model (JSmol): Interactive image
- SMILES: CCNCc1nc2c(n1CC(C)(C)O)c3ccccc3nc2N
- InChI: InChI=1S/C17H23N5O/c1-4-19-9-13-21-14-15(22(13)10-17(2,3)23)11-7-5-6-8-12(11)20-16(14)18/h5-8,19,23H,4,9-10H2,1-3H3,(H2,18,20); Key:FHJATBIERQTCTN-UHFFFAOYSA-N

Gardiquimod is an experimental drug which acts selectively at both mouse and human forms of toll-like receptor 7 (TLR7). It functions as an immune response modifier. The core structure is 1H-imidazo[4,5-c]quinoline, as found in related drugs such as imiquimod and resiquimod. It is structurally very similar to resiquimod differing only by an oxygen for nitrogen switch.
