= Voxtalisib =

Chemical compound

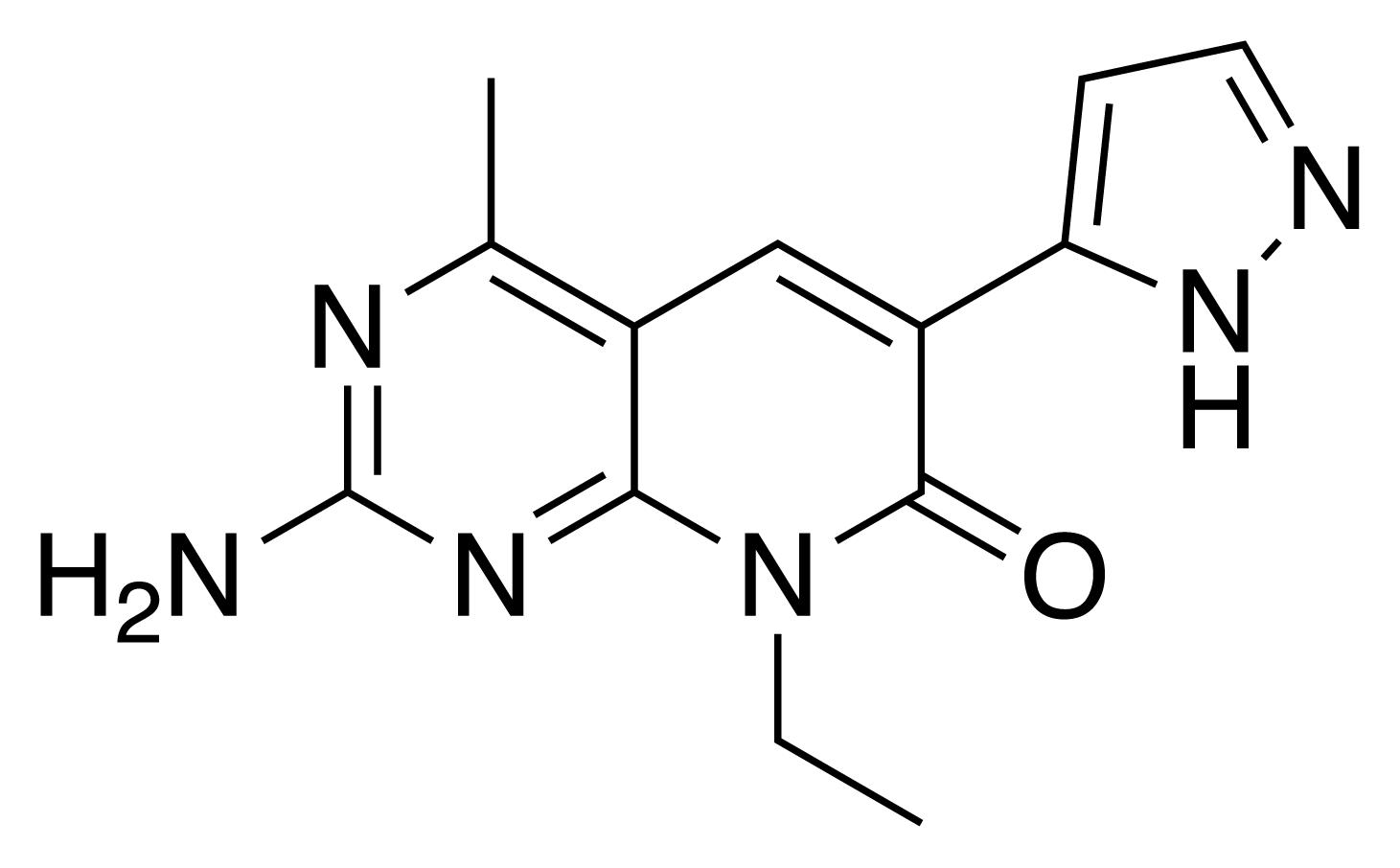

Identifiers
- IUPAC name: 2-amino-8-ethyl-4-methyl-6-(1H-pyrazol-5-yl)pyrido[2,3-d]pyrimidin-7-one
- CAS Number: 934493-76-2
- PubChem CID: 16123056
- DrugBank: DB12400
- ChemSpider: 17279963
- UNII: CVL1685GPH
- ChEBI: CHEBI:124914
- ChEMBL: ChEMBL3545366

Chemical and physical data
- Formula: C_{13}H_{14}N_{6}O
- Molar mass: 270.296 g·mol^{−1}
- 3D model (JSmol): Interactive image
- SMILES: CCN1C2=NC(=NC(=C2C=C(C1=O)C3=CC=NN3)C)N
- InChI: InChI=1S/C13H14N6O/c1-3-19-11-8(7(2)16-13(14)17-11)6-9(12(19)20)10-4-5-15-18-10/h4-6H,3H2,1-2H3,(H,15,18)(H2,14,16,17); Key:RGHYDLZMTYDBDT-UHFFFAOYSA-N

Voxtalisib (XL-765, SAR245409) is a drug which acts as a dual inhibitor of the kinase enzymes phosphatidylinositol 3-kinase (PI3K) and mechanistic target of rapamycin (mTOR). It is in clinical trials for the treatment of various types of cancer.
