= Umirolimus =

Chemical compound

Clinical data
- Trade names: Biolimus, Biolimus A9, BA9

Identifiers
- CAS Number: 851536-75-9
- PubChem CID: 11158972
- ChemSpider: 24582455
- UNII: U36PGF65JH
- KEGG: D09983

Chemical and physical data
- Formula: C_{55}H_{87}NO_{14}
- Molar mass: 986.294 g·mol^{−1}
- 3D model (JSmol): Interactive image
- SMILES: CCOCCO[C@@H]1CC[C@H](C[C@H]1OC)C[C@@H](C)[C@@H]2CC(=O)[C@@H](/C=C(/[C@H]([C@H](C(=O)[C@@H](C[C@@H](/C=C/C=C/C=C(/[C@H](C[C@@H]3CC[C@H]([C@@](O3)(C(=O)C(=O)N4CCCC[C@H]4C(=O)O2)O)C)OC)\C)C)C)OC)O)\C)C
- InChI: InChI=1S/C55H87NO14/c1-12-67-26-27-68-45-24-22-41(31-48(45)65-10)30-37(5)47-33-44(57)36(4)29-39(7)50(59)51(66-11)49(58)38(6)28-34(2)18-14-13-15-19-35(3)46(64-9)32-42-23-21-40(8)55(63,70-42)52(60)53(61)56-25-17-16-20-43(56)54(62)69-47/h13-15,18-19,29,34,36-38,40-43,45-48,50-51,59,63H,12,16-17,20-28,30-33H2,1-11H3/b15-13+,18-14+,35-19+,39-29+/t34-,36-,37-,38-,40-,41+,42+,43+,45-,46+,47+,48-,50-,51+,55-/m1/s1; Key:YYSFXUWWPNHNAZ-PKJQJFMNSA-N

Umirolimus (INN/USAN, also called Biolimus) is an immunosuppressant, a macrocyclic lactone, a highly lipophilic derivative of sirolimus. This drug is proprietary to Biosensors International, which uses it in its own drug-eluting stents, and licenses it to partners such as Terumo.

Umirolimus inhibits T cell and smooth muscle cell proliferation, and was designed for use in drug eluting stents. This analog has a chemical modification at position 40 of the rapamycin ring. It has potent immunosuppressive properties that are similar to those of sirolimus, but the drug is more rapidly absorbed by the vessel wall, readily attaches and enters smooth muscle cell membranes causing cell cycle arrest at G0, and is comparable to sirolimus in terms of potency.

== Physiological effects of umirolimus ==
The key biologic event associated with the restenotic process is the proliferation of smooth muscle cells in response to the expansion of a foreign body against the vessel wall. This proliferative response is initiated by the early expression of growth factors such as PDGF isoforms, bFGF, thrombin, which bind to cellular receptors.

The key to understanding the mechanism by which compounds like umirolimus inhibit cell proliferation is based on events which occur downstream of this growth factor binding. The signal transduction events which culminate in cell cycle arrest in the G1 phase are initiated as a result of ligand binding to an immunophilin known as FK binding protein-12. The FK designation was based on early studies conducted with tacrolimus, formerly known as FK-506, which binds this cytoplasmic protein with high affinity.
