= Biosensors International =

Medical device company based in Singapore

Biosensors International Group, Ltd.
- Company type: Public (SGX: B20 )
- Industry: Medical technology
- Founded: unknown
- Headquarters: Singapore
- Key people: Lu Yoh-Chie, Chairman and founding CEO; Mike Kleine, CEO
- Products: Medical devices
- Revenue: USD $37.8 Million (2006)
- Website: www.biosensors.com

Biosensors International Group, Ltd. is a medical device company that specializes in developing, manufacturing and licensing technologies for use in interventional cardiology procedures and critical care. The company was listed on the mainboard of the Singapore Exchange (SGX) in May 2005.

The global headquarters of the company is located in Singapore and holds the main manufacturing facilities and research and development centers. The European headquarters are in Morges, Switzerland. The Swiss office is also the legal manufacturer of BioMatrix, the company's current leading product. Biosensors International also licenses its proprietary drug-eluting stent technologies to other medical device companies and specialty stent providers, including Terumo, Devax, Inc., and Xtent, Inc.

Biosensors International Group has a joint-venture in Hong Kong listed as Shandong Weigao to market and distribute coronary stents in China.

== BioMatrix ==
BioMatrix is a drug-eluting stent that utilizes proprietary technologies of Biosensors International:

- A biodegradable Poly-Lactic Acid (PLA) polymer, which degrades into the naturally occurring lactic acid.
- The Biolimus A9 drug, a highly lipophilic derivative of sirolimus.
- The S-Stent stent platform.
- An automated stent coating technology that directly deposits the coating onto the stent surface.

Biosensors obtained approval for this drug-eluting stent product in January 2008.

== See also ==
- Drug-eluting stent
- Biolimus A9
