= Resiquimod =

Chemical compound

Clinical data
- Routes of administration: Topical
- ATC code: none

Legal status
- Legal status: Investigational

Identifiers
- IUPAC name: 1-[4-amino-2-(ethoxymethyl)imidazo[4,5-c]quinolin-1-yl]-2-methylpropan-2-ol
- CAS Number: 144875-48-9
- PubChem CID: 159603
- IUPHAR/BPS: 5051
- ChemSpider: 140330
- UNII: V3DMU7PVXF
- ChEMBL: ChEMBL383322
- CompTox Dashboard (EPA): DTXSID7040603

Chemical and physical data
- Formula: C_{17}H_{22}N_{4}O_{2}
- Molar mass: 314.389 g·mol^{−1}
- 3D model (JSmol): Interactive image
- SMILES: CCOCc1nc2c(N)nc3ccccc3c2n1CC(C)(C)O
- InChI: InChI=1S/C17H22N4O2/c1-4-23-9-13-20-14-15(21(13)10-17(2,3)22)11-7-5-6-8-12(11)19-16(14)18/h5-8,22H,4,9-10H2,1-3H3,(H2,18,19); Key:BXNMTOQRYBFHNZ-UHFFFAOYSA-N

Resiquimod (R-848) is a drug that acts as an immune response modifier, and has antiviral and antitumour activity. It is used as a topical gel in the treatment of skin lesions such as those caused by the herpes simplex virus and cutaneous T cell lymphoma, and as an adjuvant to increase the effectiveness of vaccines. In an animal disease model, systemic administration of resiquimod-loaded nanoparticles has been shown to improve response rates to cancer immunotherapy with a checkpoint inhibitor through stimulation of tumor-associated macrophages. It has several mechanisms of action, being both an agonist for toll-like receptor 7 and 8, and an upregulator of the opioid growth factor receptor. On 28 April 2016, orphan designation (EU/3/16/1653) was granted by the European Commission to Galderma R&D, France for resiquimod to be used in the treatment of cutaneous T-cell lymphoma.

== See also ==
- Imiquimod
- Gardiquimod
