= LGBTQ health =

Relationship between healthcare and the LGBTQ community

Within the healthcare sphere, lesbian, gay, bisexual, transgender, and queer (LGBTQ) people face specific challenges and hardships that make access to healthcare less equitable. According to the US Gay and Lesbian Medical Association (GLMA), some of the most common issues related to LGBTQ health are HIV/AIDS, breast and cervical cancer, hepatitis, mental health, substance use disorders, alcohol use, tobacco use, depression, access to care for transgender persons, issues surrounding marriage and family recognition, conversion therapy, refusal clause legislation, and laws that are intended to "immunize health care professionals from liability for discriminating against persons of whom they disapprove." These negative social stereotypes and pressure presented by the media are correlated with an increase of negative body image and declining self-worth, which can coincide with developing eating disorders and impact obesity rates.

LGBTQ people may face barriers to accessing healthcare on the basis of their sexual orientation and/or gender identity or expression. Many avoid or receive inferior care due to perceived or real homophobia, transphobia, or discrimination by healthcare providers and institutions. In other words, negative personal experiences, or fear of experiencing discrimination may deter these individuals from accessing care.

== General health issues affecting LGBTQ individuals ==
According to the Committee on Lesbian, Gay, Bisexual and Transgender Health Issues and Research Gaps and Opportunities, there are several difficulties in conducting health research on LGBTQ populations. These challenges include the complexity of defining sexual orientation and gender nonconformity, and the hesitancy among individuals to answer questions concerning these topics. Other posed challenges include logistical and financial challenges of recruiting a sufficient sample size for meaningful analysis, considering the difficulty of an already smaller proportion of LGBTQ individuals among the general population.

Lesbian, gay, bisexual, and transgender people are often grouped together in research and discussions. This can become problematic because they are each distinct groups that are non-inclusive of all non-heterosexual or gender non-conforming. In some studies, lesbian, gay, bisexual, and queer individuals are all combined under the label "non-heterosexual", while in HIV research, participants may be grouped together in categories that include various identities. Most research focuses on lesbian women and gay men, with significantly less attention given to bisexual, transgender, intersex, asexual, and other queer individuals, resulting in higher levels of discrimination. These disparities in research and perspectives of LGBTQ identities as a monolith erases the individuality of each identity.

A review of studies in North America found that LGBTQ individuals generally reported poorer self-rated health, more physical health symptoms, and higher rates of certain health conditions, including diabetes, asthma and high blood pressure, compared to heterosexuals. These disparities were most pronounced among adolescents and young adults, with smaller differences among older age groups. Factors such as health behaviors and experiences of discrimination, victimization, and violence among sexual minorities were found to contribute to these disparities in physical health.

Mental health appears worse among LGBTQ people than among the general population, with depression, anxiety, self-harm, and suicide ideation being higher than the general population. This arises partly from the societal discrimination, bias, and marginalization they face. About 30 percent of all completed suicides have been related to sexual identity crisis. Students who also fall into the gay, bisexual, lesbian or trans gendered identity groups report being five times as more likely to miss school because they feel unsafe after being bullied due to their sexual orientation. These mental health disparities are also evident in LGBTQ+ youth, with self-harm being reported by 65% of LGBQ youth and 46% of TGNC youth.

Research indicates noticeable barriers separating LGBTQ patients and health professionals, likely due to homophobia, assumptions of heterosexuality, and a lack of knowledge about LGBTQ people and their needs. Institutional barriers were also identified as a detriment to LGBTQ healthcare, including issues such as inappropriate referrals, lack of patient confidentiality, discontinuity of care, absence of LGBTQ specific healthcare, and lack of relevant psycho-sexual training.

Research points to issues encountered from an early age, such as sexual and gender minorities being targeted for bullying, assault, and discrimination, as contributing significantly to depression, suicide and other mental health issues in adulthood. Social research suggests that LGBTQ individuals experience discriminatory practices in accessing healthcare. One way that LGBTQ individuals have attempted to deal with discriminatory health care is by seeking "queer-friendly" health care providers.

=== Causes of LGBTQ health disparities ===
Research explains healthcare disparities in LGBTQ people is likely due to minority stress. Minority refers to the weight of facing negative societal attitudes and reactions towards one's sexual and gender identity. It includes stressors resulting from social exclusion and stigma, leading to adverse mental health effects. The theory of minority stress explains how experiences of victimization related to gender and sexual non-conformity contribute to psychological and mental health issues among LGBT individuals. This stress is rooted in negative social interactions and, when prolonged, can significantly impact mental health, leading to behaviors like substance abuse, suicidal thoughts, poor communication, and unintentional actions. Research has shown various negative mental health outcomes linked to chronic experiences of minority stress. The 'What We Know Project' reviewed thousands of peer-reviewed studies and found a strong link between discrimination and harm to the health of LGBT people. The findings showed that the presence of discrimination, stigma, and prejudice creates a hostile social climate which increase the risk of poor mental and physical health, even for those not directly exposed to the discrimination.

A systematic review of healthcare access for LGBTQ individuals found that they often struggle to communicate with healthcare providers due to fear of assumptions and embarrassment about their sexual orientation. This, coupled with homophobia in healthcare, leads to exclusion and marginalization, reducing their attendance and engagement in body care and preventive health programs.

During the past decade, the LGBTQ social movement in United States and worldwide contributed to the increasing trend of public recognition and acceptance toward the community. Reports from the Institute of Medicine, US National Institutes of Health and other nonprofit organizations have called to address the gap in LGBT training and education for healthcare professionals. Current research indicate that LGBT individuals face disparity compared to their heterosexual and cisgender counterparts regarding access to health facilities, qualities, and treatment outcomes.

It is often pointed out that the reason for this is heterosexism in medical care and research.

"Heterosexism can be purposeful (decreased funding or support of research projects that focus on sexual orientation) or unconscious (demographic questions on intake forms that ask the respondent to rate herself or himself as married, divorced, or single). These forms of discrimination limit medical research and negatively impact the health care of LGB individuals. This disparity is particularly extreme for lesbians (compared to homosexual men) because they have a double minority status, and experience oppression for being both female and homosexual."

=== LGBTQ health and social support networks ===
LGBTQ+ health outcomes are strongly influenced by social support networks, peers, and family. One example of a support network now available to some LGBTQ+ youth include Gay-Straight Alliances (GSAs), which are clubs that work to improve the climate for LGBTQ+ youth at schools and educate students and staff about issues faced by the LGBTQ+ community. Studies show that students who attend schools with GSAs have better overall health outcomes, especially mental health, for LGBTQ+ youth. The study also shows LGBTQ+ students who have access to a GSA feeling a greater sense of belonging.

The mental health trajectories of LGBTQ+ youth correlate heavily to the family and social support networks they have access to. Family rejection as a result of a young LGBTQ+ individual 'coming out' has the potential to cause adverse health outcomes. In fact, LGBTQ+ youth who experienced family rejection were 8.4 times more likely to attempt suicide, 5.9 times more likely to experience elevated levels of depression, and 3.4 times more likely to use illegal drugs than those LGBTQ+ youth who were accepted by family members. Family rejection sometimes leads youth to either run away from home or be kicked out of their home, which relates to the high rate of homelessness experienced by LGBTQ+ youth. In turn, homelessness relates to an array of adverse health outcomes that sometimes stem from homeless LGBTQ+ youths' elevated rates of involvement in prostitution and survival sex.

One longitudinal study of 248 youth across 5.5 years found that LGBTQ+ youth that have strong family and peer support experience less distress across all-time points relative to those who have uniformly low family and peer support. Over time, the psychological distress experienced by LGBTQ+ youth decreased, regardless of the amount of family and peer support that they received during adolescence. Nonetheless, the decrease in distress was greater for youth with low peer and family support than for those participants with high support. At age 17, those who lacked family support but had high peer support exhibited the highest levels of distress, but this distress level lowered to nearly the same level as those reporting high levels of support within a few years. Those LGBTQ+ youth without family support but with strong support from their peers reported an increase in family support over the years in spite of having reported the lowest family support at the age of 17.

Similarly, another study of 232 LGBTQ+ youth between the ages of 16–20 found that those with low family and social support reported higher rates of hopelessness, loneliness, depression, anxiety, somatization, suicide, global severity, and symptoms of major depressive disorder (MDD) than those who received strong family and non-family support. In contrast, those who solely received non-family support reported worse outcomes for all measured health outcomes except for anxiety and hopelessness, for which there was no difference.

Some studies have found poorer mental health outcomes for bisexual people than gay men and lesbians, which to some degree can be attributed to this community's lack of acceptance and validation both within and outside of the LGBTQ community. Those who identify as bisexual often report feeling as though their mental health issues can be traced back to discrimination and biphobia directly related to their bisexual identity. Many report feeling as though in order to be seen as valid within their LGBTQ communities or have their identity recognized by heterosexual individuals, they must practice monosexism, or the desire for only one single gender. This concept can be attributed to bisexual erasure, or labeling bisexual individuals as having invalid LGBT experiences, making them feel invisible. This erasure can manifest in the form of microaggressions, or seemingly irrelevant comments or remarks that actually cause significant harm to the community or marginalized group being targeted. These societal perspectives can be repetitive experiences or ideas that eventually manifest internally, negatively impacting a bisexual individual's confidence and self-esteem. In order to address issues of self acceptance, participants recommended embracing spirituality, exercise, the arts, and other activities that promote emotional health.

=== Assisted reproductive technologies ===
LGBTQ+ individuals face unique problems in having biological children not experienced by cisgender heterosexual men and women. Traditionally, parenthood was often seen as impossible for same sex couples and LGBT adoption was encouraged instead, but in recent decades, developmental biologists have been researching and developing techniques to facilitate same-sex reproduction, which could allow for same sex couples to both be biological parents together.

== Issues affecting lesbian women ==
=== Reproductive and sexual health ===
Lesbian, bisexual, and queer women have many of the same reproductive and sexual health needs as heterosexual women. However, queer women face disparities when it comes to reproductive and sexual health. This may be in part due to lower socioeconomic status and lower rates of insurance, particularly for bisexual individuals. Additionally, sex education (in the US) is largely heteronormative and may not provide information relevant for LGBTQ individuals (see LGBTQ sex education). Health care providers may not have adequate education regarding sexual orientation, so may not be offering their queer patients appropriate and needed services. In one survey of Ob/Gyn residents, 50% reported feeling unprepared to care for lesbian or bisexual patients and 92% reported a desire for more education on how to provide healthcare to LGBTQ patients.

==== Cervical cancer ====
A lack of screening for cervical cancer is among the most obvious and most preventable risk factor for lesbians, bisexual, and queer women in the development of invasive late-stage cervical cancer. Lesbian, bisexual, and queer women are less likely to receive appropriate screening for cervical cancer than heterosexual women, which leads to later detection of cervical cancer.

==== Contraception ====
Lesbian, bisexual, and queer women need access to contraception, both to prevent pregnancy and for a variety of non-contraceptive benefits. Estimates suggest that 3.8 million cisgender lesbian, bisexual and queer women may be using contraceptives in the United States. However, lesbian, bisexual, and queer women are less likely to use contraceptive methods, even when they are engaging in sex that could result in pregnancy.

==== Abortion ====
Lesbian, bisexual, queer, and women who identify with a sexual minority identity seek abortion care. The Guttmacher Institute estimates that approximately 5% of abortion patients in the United States identify as lesbian, bisexual, or queer. Studies relying on measures of self-reported abortions suggest that abortion is common across queer women's lives. Bisexual adolescents are more likely to terminate a pregnancy than their heterosexual counterparts, a difference that persists into adulthood. Across their lifetimes, women who identify with a sexual minority identity were more likely than heterosexual women to experience an unwanted pregnancy or terminate a pregnancy.

=== Pregnancy healthcare for lesbian women ===
Prenatal care for pregnant lesbian women is a topic within healthcare that tends to be overlooked. In recent years, there has been growing research and studies conducted so that healthcare providers are better equipped to care for these patients.

One study about the healthcare experiences of pregnant lesbian women was conducted in 2009 in Sweden. The participants of the study wanted their healthcare providers to confirm and recognize both parents, not just the biological mother. They also wanted their healthcare providers to ask questions about their "lifestyles" to demonstrate their openness about sexuality. Most of the women in the study commented that they had good experiences with healthcare. However, birth education tended to focus on mother and father dynamics. The forms that were also used tended to be heterosexist (see Heterosexism), only allowing for mother and father identities. To account for these differences, the researcher, Singer, created a document about how to improve the prenatal care of lesbian women in the United States. She found that curiosity about a patient's sexuality can take over an appointment, sometimes placing the patient into a situation where they end up educating the provider. To be more inclusive, Singer recommended that healthcare providers be more inclusive in their opening discussions by asking the woman how she became pregnant. Healthcare providers should, according to Singer, use inclusive language that can be used for all types of patients. Healthcare providers were also not aware of how much reproductive health care cost for lesbian couples and they should openly recognize this issue with their lesbian patients. Researchers Pharris, Bucchio, Dotson, and Davidson also provided suggestions on how to support lesbian couples during pregnancy. Childbirth educators should avoid assuming that parents are heterosexual or straight couples. They recommend using neutral language when discussing parent preferences. Forms, applications, and other distributed information should be inclusive of lesbian parents. They suggest using terms such as "non-biological mother, co-parent, social mother, other mother and second female parent".

In addition to an increase in research for pregnant lesbian women, midwives and Doulas have made an impact among women within the queer community for their attempt to improve the overall care of pregnant lesbian couples, educating themselves with training specifically for these individuals. Midwives were considered helpful advocates with other healthcare providers that they encountered. Midwives also discuss their perspectives. Röndahl, Bruhner, and Lindhe conducted a study in 2009 about lesbian pregnancy experiences of women in Norway. They found that midwives were the ones who were responsible for creating a space to discuss sexuality. However, midwives in the study felt that they were inadequate about having the communication tools to create this space. Additionally, the researchers found that lesbian couples were seen as different compared to straight couples. The partners have a sense of both love and friendship. Their differences were also seen when trying to find the roles for the lesbian co-mothers (non-biological mothers), as the language and questions asked did not fit their roles. Finally, the researchers found that there needed to be a balance of asking questions and being overly assertive. Midwives could ask questions about the patients' sexuality, but asking too many questions caused discomfort in the patients.

=== Breast cancer ===
In a 2013 systematic review done in the UK and US, which looked at nine studies found that overall there was no significant difference in the incidence rates of breast cancer in lesbian and bisexual women compared to heterosexual women.

However, there are also policy documents from both the UK and US Government that stated there could be higher rates of breast cancer among lesbian and bisexual women despite insufficient evidence. In a 2009 report by the UK All Party Parliamentary Group on Cancer's Inquiry into Inequalities in Cancer, it was stated that "Lesbians may have a higher risk of breast cancer".

=== Depression and anxiety ===
Depression and anxiety are thought to affect lesbians at a higher rate than in the general population. Sometimes these mental health matters are discussed as if they are homogenous across a wide range of women in society, although lesbian women experience a unique kind of depression and anxiety due to their individual experiences as queer women. Their experiences are unique because they not only experience the hardships that come along with identifying as a woman in society, but also endure the difficulties that are associated with identifying as a lesbian. This can heighten these mental health concerns among lesbian women, given they have an influx of barriers they are forced to overcome being marginalized in society.

=== Substance use disorder ===
Lesbians often have high rates of substance use, including recreational drugs, alcohol and tobacco. Studies have shown that lesbian and bisexual women are 200% more likely to smoke tobacco than other women. These higher rates of substance use can be a coping mechanism for the unique set of stressors they face in their everyday lives and within the healthcare sphere.

== Issues affecting gay men ==
=== Depression, anxiety, and suicide ===
Gay men are more likely to internalize their mental health issues than others in the LGBT community. Studies suggest that depression and anxiety appear to affect gay men at a higher rate than the general population.

Mental health issues can be more prominent in gay men who do not have adequate social support systems or who have not come out about their sexuality to friends or family. Adolescents and young adults may be at particularly high risk of suicide because of these concerns. Culturally sensitive mental health services targeted specifically at gay men may be more effective in the prevention, early detection, and treatment of these conditions. Researchers at the University of California at San Francisco found that major risk factors for depression in gay and bisexual men included a recent experience of anti-gay violence or threats, not identifying as gay, or feeling alienated from the gay community.

Results from a survey by Stonewall Scotland published in early 2012 found that 3% of gay men had attempted suicide within the past year. Despite progress in LGBT rights globally, gay men continue to experience high rates of loneliness and depression after coming out. Suicide rates among men in same-sex relationships fell significantly in Sweden and Denmark after the legalization of same-sex marriage. Researcher Annette Erlangsen suggested that along with other gay rights legislation, same-sex marriage may have reduced feelings of social stigmatization among some homosexual people and that access to marriage may have improved mental health conditions within this community.

=== HIV/AIDS ===
Men who have sex with men are sixty times more likely to acquire Human Immunodeficiency Virus HIV in the modern Western World, Japan, India, Taiwan, and other developed countries than among the general population in the United States. An estimated 62% of adult and adolescent American males living with HIV/AIDS contracted the infection through sexual contact with other men. HIV-related stigma is consistently and significantly associated with poorer physical and mental health in PLHIV (people living with HIV). The first name proposed for what is now known today as "AIDS" was gay-related immune deficiency, or GRID. This name was proposed in 1982, after public health scientists noticed clusters of Kaposi's sarcoma and Pneumocystis pneumonia among gay males in California and New York City. Some gay men may not get tested for HIV/AIDS because of fear of sexual rejection, not knowing where or how to get tested, and fear of friends/family distancing themselves after diagnosis. While the rate of gay men contracting HIV is statistically higher than other populations, most studies and research on HIV have been based solely on the gay population rather than broader social groups.

Pre-exposure prophylaxis, or "PrEP", are medications to prevent HIV infection in individuals at higher risk, such as sexually active adults or people who inject drugs. Often, these medications are taken orally as a combination of tenofovir and emtricitabine. PrEP has been shown to be highly effective, reducing the risk of HIV transmission through sexual intercourse by up to 99% and through injection drug use by 74% when used as directed. Being particularly effective in men having sex with men. However, this effectiveness is dependent upon adherence. According to some studies, a 10% decrease in adherence reduced efficacy by 13% These adherence issues have led to a lack of data on the effectiveness of PrEP for heterosexual individuals. While MSM are at higher risk for HIV transmission, the marketing of such medications being towards that one demographic both limits education on sexual health resources and continues stigma against HIV testing and prevention in gay men. There is also a lack of data on other high-risk population like sex workers, transgender women (1% of participants in one study identified as transgender women), and heterosexual couples (in the studies done, there was notably poor adherence)

Some health officials and policy-makers believe the use of PrEP may lead to increase in unsafe safe practices since users are more protected from HIV. This is untrue, as studies have shown no significant change in number of sex partners, an increase in condom use, and no increase in STIs.

The World Health Organization recommends different forms of PrEP, including oral PrEP for those at substantial risk, event-driven PrEP for men who have sex with men (MSM), and the dapivirine vaginal ring for women at substantial risk who do not have access to oral PrEP. One study showed that there was possible side effects of decreased renal function, however upon stoppage of use changes were reversed Additionally, no increased mortality rate for patients using PrEP was found. PrEP is particularly safe and effective in MSM, serodiscordant heterosexual couples, and people who inject drugs (PWIDs) Overall, PrEP delivery in addition to patient counselling and HIV testing may be helpful in raising awareness of the risks of poor adherence to PrEP.

=== Other sexually transmitted infections (STIs) ===
The US Centers for Disease Control recommends annual screening for syphilis, gonorrhea, HIV and chlamydia for men who have sex with men.

Black gay men have a greater risk of HIV and other STIs than white gay men. However, their reported rates of unprotected anal intercourse are similar to those of men who have sex with men (MSM) of other ethnicities.

Men who have sex with men are at an increased risk for hepatitis, and immunization for hepatitis A and hepatitis B is recommended for all men who have sex with men. Safer sex is currently the only means of prevention for the hepatitis C.

Human papilloma virus, which causes anal and genital warts, plays a role in the increased rates of anal cancers in gay men, and some health professionals now recommend routine screening with anal pap smears to detect early cancers. Men have higher prevalence of oral HPV than women. Oral HPV infection is associated with HPV-positive oropharyngeal cancer.

=== Eating disorders and body image ===
The term "body image" refers to how an individual perceives their own physical appearance, which can ultimately affect their sense of worth. Body image issues most commonly develop within an individual's teenage years, when self-consciousness is internalized and self-awareness is on the rise. These ideations are typically taught by parents, and can be influenced positively or negatively based on parenting interactions and styles. Research has found that women are primarily affected by negative body image thinking, but both sexes are strongly affected during the puberty years with poor thoughts regarding weight and comparing themselves to their peers. The traditional male–female gender binary continue to determine the standards of femininity and masculinity within today's society.

Negative body image can lead to the development of eating disorders, including restrictive or binge-based. Binge-eating disorder is the most common eating disorder recorded in the US and has led to a rise in obesity rates. Binge-eating disorder is recorded more commonly in women compared to men, especially those who are obese, defined as a body mass index (BMI) recorded over 30. BMI is measured by recording an individual's height and weight, and comparing them to the overall health of a population. Transgender people tend to record higher levels of obesity and being overweight than cisgender individuals due the use of hormone replacement and halting therapies that can influence weight gain. The disorder consists of several types of criteria that an individual must fall under in order to be diagnosed with the condition, such as: eating more than others typically would in the same scenario, eating at specific intervals, feeling disgusted with oneself after eating, overeating when not physically hungry, or feeling a sense of lack of control around food or food-derived situations. Individuals who have been diagnosed and labeled as obese often face mistreatment in the healthcare setting and tend to have higher rates of depression and anxiety, and if they are of a different sexual orientation this can make matters worse.

Sexual orientation has been recorded to be involved in medically defining obesity and likelihood of being diagnosed as overweight. Women identifying as lesbian or bisexual have a higher disposition and risk of being obese/overweight compared to straight women. Race and ethnicity also play a crucial role in determining obesity based on BMI, with women of color and those of sexual minority, those differing from heterosexuality, being at high risk for obesity. Gay men are more likely than straight men to develop eating disorders such as bulimia or anorexia nervosa. The cause of this correlation remains poorly understood, but is hypothesized to be related to the ideals of body image prevalent in the LGBT community. Obesity, on the other hand, affects relatively fewer gay and bisexual men than straight men.

=== Substance use ===
David McDowell of Columbia University, who has studied substance use in gay men, wrote that club drugs are particularly popular at gay bars and circuit parties. Studies have found different results on the frequency of tobacco use among gay and bisexual men compared to that of heterosexual men, with one study finding a 50% higher rate among sexual minority men, and another encountering no differences across sexual orientations. According to a 2012 review of research on substance use among bisexual, gay, and heterosexual men, those who reported having a same-sex partner in the year previous were more likely than those men reporting opposite sex partners to report a lifetime use of illicit drugs. They were also more likely to report at least one symptom of drug dependence. In a 2020 U.S. study of participants who had sex with men, with most participants being cisgender gay or bisexual men, and were at elevated risk for HIV, persistent methamphetamine use was associated with higher odds of acquiring HIV.

== Issues affecting bisexual people ==
Typically, bisexual individuals and their health and well-being are not studied independently of lesbian and gay individuals. Thus, there is limited research on the health issues that affect bisexual individuals. It is important to consider that the majority of bisexual individuals are well-adjusted and healthy, despite having higher instances of health issues than the heterosexual population.

=== Body image and eating disorders ===
Queer individuals overall are more likely to develop an eating disorder or exhibit eating disorder-related behaviors. There are higher rates of easting disorders among bisexual individuals as compared to heterosexual individuals. For bisexual men, social comparison, desire for muscularity, and gay community involvement all drive higher symptoms among this group. Bisexual women exhibited the same motivators, minus the drive for muscularity. Bisexual women are twice as likely as lesbians to have an eating disorder and, if they are openly queer, to be twice as likely as heterosexual women to have an eating disorder.

=== Mental health and suicide ===
Bisexual females are higher on suicidal intent, mental health difficulties and mental health treatment than bisexual males. In a survey by Stonewall Scotland, 7% of bisexual men had attempted suicide in the past year. Bisexual women are twice as likely as heterosexual women to report suicidal ideation if they have disclosed their sexual orientation to a majority of individuals in their lives; those who are not disclosed are three times more likely. Bisexual individuals have a higher prevalence of suicidal ideation and attempts than heterosexual individuals, and more self-injurious behavior than gay men and lesbians. A 2011 survey found that 44% of bisexual middle and high school students had thought about suicide in the past month.

=== Substance use ===
Female adolescents who report relationships with same- and other-sex partners have higher rates of hazardous alcohol use and substance use disorders. This includes higher rates of marijuana and other illicit drug use. Behaviorally and self-identified bisexual women are significantly more likely to smoke cigarettes and have been drug users as adolescents than heterosexual women. In an analysis of the 2019 U.S. National Survey on Drug Use and Health, bisexual adults were found to have scored higher on the measure of drug abuse and dependence than lesbian, gay, or heterosexual adults.

=== Cancer ===
Bisexual women are more likely to be nulliparous, overweight and obese, have higher smoking rates and alcohol drinking than heterosexual women, all risk factors for breast cancer. Bisexual men practicing receptive anal intercourse are at higher risk for anal cancer caused by the human papillomavirus (HPV).

=== HIV/AIDS and sexual health ===
Most research on HIV/AIDS focuses on gay and bisexual men than lesbians and bisexual women. Evidence for risky sexual behavior in bisexually behaving men has been conflicted. Bisexually active men generally use condoms at the same rate as heterosexual men. Men who have sex with men and women are less likely than homosexually behaving men to be HIV-positive or engage in unprotected receptive anal sex, but more likely than heterosexually behaving men to be HIV-positive. Although there are no confirmed cases of HIV transmitted from female to female, women who have sex with both men and women have higher rates of HIV than homosexual or heterosexual women.

== Issues affecting transgender people ==
=== Access to health care ===
Transgender individuals are often reluctant to seek medical care or are denied access by providers due to transphobia or a lack of knowledge or experience with transgender health. Additionally, in some jurisdictions, health care related to transgender issues, especially sex reassignment therapy, is not covered by medical insurance.

The World Professional Association for Transgender Health (WPATH) Standards of Care provide a set of non-binding clinical guidelines for health practitioners who are treating transgender patients. The Yogyakarta Principles, a global human rights proposal, affirms in Principle 17 that "States shall (g) facilitate access by those seeking body modifications related to gender reassignment to competent, non-discriminatory treatment, care and support.

In the UK, the NHS is legally required to provide treatment for gender dysphoria. As of 2018, Wales refers patients to the Gender Identity Clinic (GIC) in London, but the Welsh government plans to open a gender identity clinic in Cardiff.

In India, a 2004 report claimed that hijras 'face discrimination in various ways' in the Indian health-care system, and sexual reassignment surgery is unavailable in government hospitals in India.

In Bangladesh, health facilities sensitive to hijra culture are virtually non-existent, according to a report on hijra social exclusion.

=== Denial of health care in the United States ===
The 2008–2009 National Transgender Discrimination Survey, published by National Gay and Lesbian Task Force and the National Center for Transgender Equality in partnership with the National Black Justice Coalition, shed light on the discrimination transgender and gender non-conforming people face in many aspects of daily life, including in medical and health care settings. The survey reported that 19% of respondents had been refused healthcare by a doctor or other provider because they identify as transgender or gender non-conforming and transgender people of color were more likely to have been refused healthcare. 36% of American Indian and 27% of multi-racial respondents reported being refused healthcare, compared to 17% of white respondents. In addition, the survey found that 28% of respondents said they had been verbally harassed in a healthcare setting and 2% of respondents reported being physically attacked in a doctor's office. Transgender people particularly vulnerable to being assaulted in a doctor's office were those who identify as African-Americans (6%), those who engaged in sex work, drug sales or other underground work (6%), those who transitioned before they were 18 (5%), and those who identified as undocumented or non-citizens (4%).

An updated version of the NTDS survey, called the 2015 US Transgender Survey, was published in December 2016.

Section 1557 of the Affordable Care Act contains nondiscrimination provisions to protect transgender people. In December 2016, however, a federal judge issued an injunction to block the enforcement of "the portion of the Final Rule that interprets discrimination on the basis of 'gender identity' and 'termination of pregnancy'". Under the Trump administration, Roger Severino was appointed as civil rights director for the US Department of Health and Human Services (HHS). Severino opposes Section 1557 and HHS has said it "will not investigate complaints about anti-transgender discrimination", as explained by the National Center for Transgender Equality. When a journalist asked Severino if, under the HHS Conscience and Religious Freedom division whose creation was announced in January 2018, transgender people could be "denied health care", he said "I think denial is a very strong word" and that healthcare "providers who simply want to serve the people they serve according to their religious beliefs" should be able to do so without fear of losing federal funding. On May 24, 2019, Severino announced a proposal to reverse this portion of Section 1557, and, as of April 23, 2020, the Justice Department was reportedly reviewing the Trump administration's "final rule" which HHS acknowledged would reverse Section 1557's gender identity protections.

On April 2, 2019, Texas Senate Bill 17 passed by a vote of 19–12. It would allow state-licensed professionals such as doctors, pharmacists, lawyers, and plumbers to deny services to anyone if the professional cites a religious objection. To reveal the motivations behind the bill, opponents proposed an amendment to prohibit discrimination based on sexual orientation or gender identity; the amendment failed 12–19.

On October 15, 2019, federal judge Reed O'Connor vacated the part of the Affordable Care Act that protects transgender people. The ruling means that federally-funded healthcare insurers and providers may deny treatment or coverage based on sex, gender identity or termination of pregnancy, and that doctors are not required to provide any services whatsoever to transgender people—even if they're the same services provided to non-transgender people, and even if they're medically necessary.

Hormone treatment for transgender youth is illegal in Tennessee. On May 18, 2021, Governor Bill Lee signed a healthcare bill specifically prohibiting healthcare providers from prescribing hormone treatment for gender dysphoria in prepubertal minors, specifically allowing other hormone treatments to be prescribed for conditions such as growth deficiencies.

=== Transgender youth healthcare ===
Legislators in 25 US states have introduced bills to restrict access to gender-affirming medical care for minors in the past two years. As of August 2022, these bills have become law in Alabama, Arkansas, Arizona, and Tennessee. Relevant professional organizations including The American Medical Association, The American Academy of Pediatrics, The American Psychiatric Association, and The American Academy of Child & Adolescent Psychiatry have explicitly voiced opposition to these laws. Most of these laws include sections that would penalize any healthcare providers that would acknowledge gender affirming care for transgender youth.

=== Insurance coverage ===
Although they are not the only uninsured population in the United States, transgender people are less likely than cisgender people to have access to health insurance and if they do, their insurance plan may not cover medically necessary services. The National Transgender Discrimination Survey reported that 19% of survey respondents stated that they had no health insurance compared to 15% of the general population. They were also less likely to be insured by an employer. Undocumented non-citizens had particularly high rates of non-coverage (36%) as well as African-Americans (31%), compared to white respondents (17%).

While a majority of US insurance policies expressly exclude coverage for transgender care, regulations are shifting to expand coverage of transgender and gender non-conforming health care. A number of private insurance carriers cover transgender-related health care under the rubric of "transgender services", "medical and surgical treatment of gender identity disorder", and "gender reassignment surgery". Nine states (California, Colorado, Connecticut, Illinois, Massachusetts, New York, Oregon, Vermont, and Washington) and the District of Columbia require that most private insurance plans cover medically necessary health care for transgender patients.

Depending on where they live, some transgender people are able to access gender-specific health care through public health insurance programs. Medicaid does not have a federal policy on transgender health care and leaves the regulation of the coverage of gender-confirming health care up to each state. While Medicaid does not fund sex reassignment surgery in forty states, several, like New York and Oregon, now require Medicaid to cover (most) transgender care.

=== Cancer ===
Cancers related to hormone use include breast cancer and liver cancer. In addition, trans men who have not had removal of the uterus, ovaries, or breasts remain at risk to develop cancer of these organs, while trans women remain at risk for prostate cancer. The likelihood of prostate cancer in transgender women taking anti-androgens is significantly lower than in cisgender men.

=== Mental health ===
According to transgender advocate Rebecca Allison, trans people are "particularly prone" to depression and anxiety: "In addition to loss of family and friends, they face job stress and the risk of unemployment. Trans people who have not transitioned and remain in their birth gender are very prone to depression and anxiety. Suicide is a risk, both prior to transition and afterward. One of the most important aspects of the transgender therapy relationship is management of depression and/or anxiety." Depression is significantly correlated with experienced discrimination. In a study of San Francisco trans women, 62% reported depression. In a 2003 study of 1093 trans men and trans women, there was a prevalence of 44.1% for clinical depression and 33.2% for anxiety.

Suicide attempts are common in transgender people. In some transgender populations the majority have attempted suicide at least once. 41% of the respondents of the National Transgender Discrimination Survey reported having attempted suicide. This statistic was even higher for certain demographics – for example, 56% of American Indian and Alaskan Native transgender respondents had attempted suicide. In contrast, 1.6% of the American population has attempted suicide. In the sample all minority ethnic groups (Asian, Latino, black, American Indian and mixed race) had higher prevalence of suicide attempts than white people. Number of suicide attempts was also correlated with life challenges - 64% of those surveyed who had been sexually assaulted had attempted suicide. 76% who had been assaulted by teachers or other school staff had made an attempt.

In 2012 the Scottish Transgender Alliance conducted the Trans Mental Health Study. 74% of the respondents who had transitioned reported improved mental health after transitioning. 53% had self-harmed at some point, and 11% currently self-harmed. 55% had been diagnosed with or had a current diagnosis of depression. An additional 33% believed that they currently had depression, or had done in the past, but had not been diagnosed. 5% had a current or past eating disorder diagnosis. 19% believed that they had had an eating disorder or currently had one, but had not been diagnosed. 84% of the sample had experienced suicide ideation and 48% had made a suicide attempt. 3% had attempted suicide more than 10 times. 63% of respondents who transitioned thought about and attempted suicide less after transitioning. Other studies have found similar results.

Trans women appear to be at greater risk than trans men and the general population of dying of suicide. However, trans men are more likely to attempt suicide than trans women.

Personality disorders are common in transgender people.

Gender identity disorder is another mental health issue transgender individuals may experience. This is defined as an inconsistent feeling between a person's sex assigned when they were born and what they feel their gender identity is now. This can cause emotional and physical distress within the individual, sometimes beginning as early as childhood. Until the 1970s, psychotherapy was the primary treatment for GID. However, today the treatment protocol involves biomedical interventions, with psychotherapy on its own being unusual.

There has been controversy about the inclusion of transsexuality in the DSM, one claim being that Gender Identity Disorder of Childhood was introduced to the DSM-III in 1980 as a 'backdoor-maneuver' to replace homosexuality, which was removed from the DSM-II in 1973.

=== Hormones ===
Transgender individuals frequently take hormones to achieve feminizing or masculinizing effects. Side effects of hormone use include increased risk of blood clotting, high or low blood pressure, elevated blood sugar, water retention, dehydration, electrolyte disturbances, liver damage, increased risk for heart attack and stroke. Use of unprescribed hormones is common, but little is known about the associated risks. One potential hazard is HIV transmission from needle sharing. Transgender men seeking to get pregnant were once told that they needed to stop hormone therapy or testosterone treatment as it could be difficult to become pregnant or could cause potential birth defects, however this stopping of treatment may no longer be necessary with the development of improved technology. More research needs to be conducted in this field in order to make a definitive conclusion.

=== Injectable silicone ===
Some transgender women use injectable silicone, sometimes administered by lay persons, to achieve their desired physique or gender expression. This is most frequently injected into the hip and buttocks. It is associated with considerable medical complications, including morbidity. Such silicone may migrate, causing disfigurement years later. Non-medical grade silicone may contain contaminants, and includes the risk of being injected using a shared needle. In a study of transgender individuals in New York City, silicone injection issues occur frequently enough to be categorized as 'epidemic', finding that 18% of transgender women were receiving silicone injections from 'black market' providers.

=== Sexually transmitted infections ===
Trans people (especially trans women – trans men have actually been found to have a lower rate of HIV than the general US population) are frequently forced into sex work to make a living, and are subsequently at increased risk for STIs including HIV. According to the National Transgender Discrimination Survey, 2.64% of American transgender people are HIV positive, and transgender sex workers are over 37 times more likely than members of the general American population to be HIV positive. HIV is also more common in trans people of color. For example, in a study by the National Institute of Health more than 56% of African-American trans women were HIV-positive compared to 27% of trans women in general. This has been connected to how trans people of color are more likely to be sex workers.

A 2012 meta analysis of studies assessing rates of HIV infection among transgender women in 15 countries found that trans women are 49 times more likely to have HIV than the general population. Considering the global transgender population in general among adults of reproductive age, the estimate is around 13 times more likely to be infected with HIV. HIV positive trans persons are likely to be unaware of their status. In one study, 73% of HIV-positive trans women were unaware of their status.

Latin American trans women have a HIV prevalence of 18–38% as of 2016, but most Latin American countries do not recognize transgender people as a population. Therefore, there are no laws catering to their health needs.

Between 2010 and 2022, the average HIV prevalence in trans women in sub-Saharan Africa was 50% higher than that of cis-men who have sex with men. In eastern and southern Africa the median prevalence among trans women was 25% and in western and central Africa 23.3%.

Transgender people have higher levels of interaction with the police than the general population. 7% of transgender Americans have been held in prison cell simply due to their gender identity/expression. This rate is 41% for transgender African-Americans. 16% of respondents had been sexually assaulted in prison, a risk factor for HIV. 20% of trans women are sexually assaulted in prison, compared to 6% of trans men. Trans women of color are more likely to be assaulted whilst in prison. 38% of black trans women report having been sexually assaulted in prison compared to 12% of white trans women.

In a San Francisco study, 68% of trans women and 55% of trans men reported having been raped, a risk factor for HIV.

=== Substance use ===
Transgender individuals are generally more likely than the general population to experience substance abuse as a result of mental health stressors and mistreatment due to their transgender identity. Studies have shown that transgender men are 50% more likely, and trans women 200% more likely to smoke cigarettes than non-transgender populations. It has been suggested that high tobacco usage among transgender individuals could be attributed to its ability to help in weight loss. In a study of transgender people, the majority of individuals had a history of non-injection drug use with 90% of transgender individuals using marijuana, 66% for cocaine, 24% for heroin, and 48% for crack. It has been suggested that transgender people who are more accepted and supported by their families are less likely to develop substance use issues.

In the Trans Mental Health Study 2012, 24% of participants had used drugs within the past year, with the most common substance being marijuana. A study published in 2013 found that among a sample of transgender adults, 26.5% had engaged in non-medical use of prescription drugs, most commonly being analgesics. Both transgender men and women reported higher levels of high-risk polysubstance use than cisgender and nonbinary respondents in a sample of 306 LGBTQ participants. Another study involving a meta-analysis of multiple other studies found that the transgender participants involved had 65% higher chances of engaging in current tobacco use and 48% higher odds of experiencing lifetime substance use as compared to the cisgender individuals.

=== Gynecologic and reproductive care ===
Transgender and nonbinary people often encounter additional unique barriers in attaining gynecologic and reproductive care. Providers and staff often make assumptions about gender identity or expression of patients in a "women's health" clinic and many providers lack cultural competence in caring for transgender and nonbinary patients. Furthermore, many providers are not adequately trained in order to help the LGBTQ+ community. Certain procedures, such as a gonadectomy, that individuals may undergo for medical transition can limit their chances of fertility in the future, but not in every case. Other obstacles transgender individuals may encounter include procedure expenses, patient mistreatment, bias, and treatment invasiveness. There are still many gaps in knowledge when it comes to issues such as hormone therapy and medical transition surgeries and how they may impact pregnancy or fertility for these individuals. Challenges in accessing insurance coverage is another common barrier to transgender healthcare for transgender and nonbinary patients.

== Issues affecting intersex people ==
Intersex is a term used to describe a diverse range of natural variations in sex characteristics and development that do not fit within the typical definitions of male or female. These variations can include at least 40 recognized differences in sex characteristics, some common variations are Klinefelter syndrome, congenital adrenal hyperplasia, Swyer syndrome, and complete androgen insensitivity syndrome. The medical language surrounding intersex health is complex. According to the National LGBT Health Education Center's guide for Affirming Primary Care for Intersex People in 2020, differences of sex development (DSD) or diverse sex development, is the current medical terminology to describe these variations. While certain intersex variations are identifiable either prenatally or at birth, others may not become apparent until puberty or even later in life.

While most intersex individuals identify as heterosexual and cisgender, they are incorporated into the LGBT community because of their shared experiences of discrimination based on misconceptions about gender and biology. Additionally, there is a lack of medical and behavioral health research for intersex people often leading to gaps in understanding of their specific needs and experiences.

The medical needs and issues of intersex individuals vary greatly due to the diversity of intersex variations. Some may not require specialized medical attention, while others may need care at specific developmental stages and some have lifelong needs related to their unique variations. Primary care providers play a crucial role in assisting individuals and families in finding trusted referrals and navigating specialized care. Some common medical specialty care needs include steroid replacement for those with combined adrenal gland/gonadal variations, gynecologic, urologic, and sexual health care to address complications from prior surgeries, hormone therapy for inducing secondary sex characteristics, affirming gender identity, or replacing sex hormones after gonad removal, prevention and treatment of osteoporosis, and cancer surveillance for internal gonads. Some individuals or families may choose to surgically remove internal gonads or gonadal streaks if there is an elevated cancer risk, although this risk may not always be present, and updated recommendations should be followed.

=== Reconstructive surgery ===
Since the 1950s, the medical approach to intersex infants and children focused on surgically altering their genitalia to conform to typical male or female appearances and prevent non-heterosexual relationships. This practice persists in some institutions, often pressuring families to consent to surgeries that may be unnecessary without adequate counseling or information about alternatives. Intersex individuals often suffer adverse effects from these surgeries, including physical complications (scarring, chronic pain, loss of sensation, urinary and sexual dysfunction) and psychological distress (PTSD, depression, feelings of loneliness and fear or intimacy). Despite Intersex-led organizations and professional societies, including statements by the American Medical Student Association, WHO and American Academy of Family Physicians, some specialists continue to perform these surgeries, highlighting the ongoing need for advocacy and awareness.

== Issues affecting asexual people ==
Allonormativity, which stems from the idea of allosexuality (non-asexuality), assumes that experiencing sexual attraction and desiring sexual activity are normal human traits. This perspective may pathologize and stigmatize asexuality, where individuals lack sexual attraction or desire. Compulsory sexuality reinforces the idea that any form of allosexuality (such as bisexuality or heterosexuality) is superior to being asexual. These societal norms can make it challenging for people to accept and embrace asexual identities, including their own, leading some asexual individuals to adopt different labels, such as bisexuality or pansexuality, due to a lack of awareness and acceptance of asexuality. While many studies have focused on cisgender women, research indicates that the process of recognizing and internalizing an asexual identity is similar for cisgender men, despite some gender-related differences in experiences.

In 2018, the UK government released findings from a nationwide survey on LGBT+ life in the country. One notable but often overlooked finding was that asexual individuals had poorer outcomes compared to those identifying as other sexual orientations. Asexual respondents reported lower life satisfaction scores and were less likely to feel comfortable living in the UK. They were also the most likely to hide their sexuality due to fear of a negative response.

=== Differentiation from sexual dysfunction ===
Recent studies are investigating biological aspects of asexuality and comparing asexual individuals with non-asexual (allosexual) groups to distinguish asexuality from sexual dysfunction and psychological disorders. Eye-tracking and penile plethysmography were used to measure responses to sexual stimuli in cisgender men. Heterosexual men focused more on erotic images, while asexual men distributed their attention more evenly. Asexual men also showed lower genital and subjective arousal to erotic films compared to allosexual men, but both groups had similar arousal during sexual fantasy, suggesting asexuality is not linked to physiological dysfunction.

Another study compared heterosexual cisgender women with asexual individuals who identified as women, non-binary, or trans. The heterosexual group included individuals with Sexual Interest/Arousal Disorder (SIAD). The heterosexual SIAD group fixated faster and more often on sexual stimuli compared to the asexual group, indicating that asexuality is distinct from psychological disorders like SIAD.

== Health of LGBTQ+ people of color ==
In a review of research, Balmsam, Molina, et al., found that "LGBT issues were addressed in 3,777 articles dedicated to public health; of these, 85% omitted information on race/ethnicity of participants". However, studies that have noted race have found significant health disparities between white LGBTQ+ people and LGBTQ+ people of color. LGBTQ+ health research has also been criticized for lack of diversity in that, for example, a study may call for lesbians, but many black and minority ethnic groups do not use the term lesbian or gay to describe themselves.

There have not been many studies dedicated to researching health issues in LGBTQ+ people of color until fairly recently. Studies have determined that LGBTQ+ individuals have an elevated risk of early mortality and more mental and physical health issues than heterosexual individuals. In particular, A study conducted by Kim, Jen, Fredriksen-Goldsen published in 2017 delved deeper into the health disparities found among LGBT older adults. It is well known in comparison with white LGBT older adults, black and Latino LGBT older adults tend to have a lower quality of life in relation to their health. The study finds that this is due to a variety of factors, including discrimination, educational attainment, income levels, and social resources. Black LGBT adults experienced higher levels of LGBT discrimination than their white counterparts. However, the study found that black and Latino LGBT adults had comparable mental health to white LGBT elders, presumed to be due to increased levels of spirituality characteristic of Latino and African American communities.

The influences of racism, homophobia, and transphobia can have detrimental effects on mental health of LGBTQ+ people of color, especially in intersection with one another. Velez, Polihronakis et al. look at prior research that indicates that experiences of homophobia and internalized homophobia are associated with poor mental health. Similar research also indicates that racism and internalized racism are associated with poor mental health as well. When combined, discrimination and internalized oppression interact with one another and contribute to psychological distress. Both homophobia and racism contribute additively to distress, but it was noted that homophobic discrimination and internalized racism had the most significant and detrimental effects on well-being. This study shows similar results to previous research in this aspect. This pattern was also seen in a sample of LGBT Latinx people.

There are significant gaps in knowledge regarding health disparities among transgender individuals. In general, transgender individuals tends to be effected the most acutely by LGBTQ+ issues. This is even more prominent in transgender people of color. Transgender individuals are also more likely to experience greater socioeconomic disadvantages, greater stressors, and more exposure to traumatic events. Transgender individuals, particularly transgender individuals of color, struggle with access and discriminatory treatment when seeking medical and mental health care access.

Transgender people and people of color both struggle with poor health care experiences, both medical and regarding mental health, in the United States. When looking at the experiences of transgender people of color, healthcare provider's assumptions and biases about them negatively influence their healthcare experience. Even when seeking care from LGBT specific or LGBT friendly health care providers, people of color often worry about experiencing racism. Positive healthcare experiences for transgender people of color can most often be attributed to provider's respect and knowledge around gender identity and sexuality, as well as cultural competency.

LGBT people also routinely struggle with medical and mental health care access in relation to the general public. Transgender people as noted above, transgender and gender nonconforming people are significantly more likely to express concerns about how they will be treated in seeking healthcare. LGBT people of color and LGBT people with low incomes were found to be more likely to experience care that was discriminatory and substandard. In particular, transgender people of color and transgender people with low incomes were more likely to experience care that is discriminatory and substandard. These issues are highlighted in health care institutions serving populations with limited access, options, or significant health care disparities. This is particularly true of public hospitals, which have fewer resources than nonprofit hospitals and academic medical centers, and are under deeper financial pressures. Public hospitals have very little incentive to invest in care for marginalized populations, and as such there has been very little progress on LGBT inclusion in health care. The healthcare community itself has contributed to LGBT health disparities, through prejudice and inadequate knowledge. Correcting these disparities will require a significant investment by the healthcare system.

A study conducted by Gowin, Taylor, Dunnington, Alshuwaiyer, and Cheney researches the needs of this demographic. All of the transgender asylum seekers studied had experienced some form of threat, physical assault, and/or sexual assault while living in Mexico. Stressors were reduced upon arrival in the United States, but not all and few were eliminated. Stressors included assaults (verbal, physical, and sexual), unstable environments, fear of safety, concealing undocumented status, and economic insecurity. These lead to multiple health consequences, including mental illness, sleep issues, isolation, substance use, and suicidal tendencies. Asylum seekers often had difficulties accessing health care services for hormones, and often withheld information during treatment for fear of being reported for holding undocumented status. Distrust of authority figures is not uncommon in minority groups. Methods of contact that allow trust should be built to encourage access to health services. Health promotion practices have found some success; including the use of lay health workers, which also has the benefit of employing community members. A focus on inclusive and non-judgmental communication methods in training and development can also help reduce distrust of health services by transgender and ethnic minority patients.

== Healthcare education ==
Various bodies have called for dedicated teaching on LGBTQ+ issues for healthcare students and professionals, including the World Health Organization and the Association of American Medical Colleges. A 2017 systematic review found that dedicated training improved knowledge, attitudes and practice, but noted that programmes often had minimal involvement by LGBT individuals themselves.

OB/GYN residents in the state of Illinois were asked to complete an online survey in order to assess their confidence to treat LGBTQ+ patients and share their experiences with LGBTQ+ individuals. Approximately 60% of the residents said that they had no experience with LGBTQ+ folks outside of the work setting . In a work setting, the results showed that the majority of the Ob/gyn residents felt unprepared to treat lesbian, bisexual, or transgender patients. About 63% of this group shared that their medical programs provide 1–5 years of LGBTQ+ healthcare training, with some residents saying that they received no education on this in the past year. A specific area that Ob/gyn residents in Illinois reported not feeling prepared to deal with included hormonal therapy for transgender patients. From this study, 90% of Ob/gyn residents report having a strong desire to learn more about how to provide healthcare for the LGBTQ+ community, but due to curriculum crowding, there has been some barriers to achieving this goal.

Several government-funded organizations have launched other initiatives to involve LGBT individuals:

"Healthy People 2020: Lesbian, Gay, Bisexual, and Transgender Health" is a government-funded initiative sponsored by the Office of Disease Prevention and Health Promotion, based on a 10-year agenda with the goal of improving the nation's health in measurable ways. "The Health of Lesbian, Gay, Bisexual, and Transgender People: Building a Foundation for Better Understanding" written by the Institute of Medicine and based on research funded by the National Institutes of Health emphasizes the importance of collecting data on the demographics of LGBT populations, improving methods for collecting this data, and increasing the participation of LGBT individuals in research. "LGBT Health and Well-being" published by the US Department of Health & Human Services (HHS), this 2012 report outlines the LGBT Issues Coordinating Committee's objectives for 2011 and 2012. The HHS also hosts an online center for information on LGBT health, including HHS reports, information on access to health care, and resources organized for specific communities within the LGBT population (including LGBT youth, people living with HIV, refugees, women, and older adults).

In addition, many nonprofit initiatives have worked to connect LGBT people to competent healthcare. OutCare Health and Health Professionals Advancing LGBTQ Equality (formerly known as the Gay & Lesbian Medical Association) hosts an online directories of culturally-competent medical professionals.

In 2019, WAXOH, in partnership with DatingPositives, The Phluid Project, Bi.org, Hairrari, the OUT Foundation, launched #WeNeedAButton, a campaign that calls for patient-matching sites like Yelp and ZocDoc to add a queer-friendly button or filter, so that consumers can easily see which doctors are LGBTQ-friendly. The campaign was launched during Pride 2019, on the 50th anniversary of Stonewall, and was supported by ambassador and journalist Zachary Zane and sexual health advocate Josh Robbins.

Kaiser Permanente, the third-largest health care organization in the country and headquartered in Oakland, has been recognized by the Human Rights Campaign Foundation for its commitment to LGBTQ in its 2018 Healthcare Equality Index, and has designated the organization a "healthcare equality leader" every year since 2010.

Additionally, universities including the University of Michigan have provided Continuing Medical Education courses or modules to OB/GYNs in order to be able to better serve the LGBTQ+ community. There are five modules available on YouTube that are each about fifteen minutes long and cover topics such as gender identity and insurance coverage for transgender individuals. These modules were created by physicians and activists.

== COVID-19 ==
In April 2020, educators at the University of Toronto emphasized the need to educate health care practitioners about the vulnerability of LGBTQ+ people in the COVID-19 pandemic. Additionally, during the pandemic, 56% of LGBT youth reported poor mental health.

== Health of LGBTQ youth ==
=== Mental health of LGBTQ youth ===
In general, LGBTQ youth face some level of discrimination in the home, school, and among their peers, across many different environments. Local, state, or national laws, are also shown to affect the mental health of LGBTQ youth, as these laws can affect acceptance and integration of youth in society, as well as medical intervention needed for the prevention of suicide or self-harm. Even just the legalization of same-sex marriage can often lead to a reduction in LGBTQ adolescent suicide and improved mental health.

=== Substance use ===
In the Trevor Project's 2021 National Survey on LGBTQ Youth Mental Health, 34% of respondents reported using cannabis over the previous year, and 11% stated they had taken a prescription drug not prescribed to them. Those who engaged in weekly or daily use of prescription drugs without a prescription faced nearly three times the risk of reporting a suicide attempt in the past year. It has been suggested that community resources aimed at supporting LGBTQ youth may function as protective factors against substance use in these adolescents. Greater availability of these resources is associated with lower odds of lifetime illicit drug use among both boys and girls in the LGBTQ community. Greater community support has also been associated with lower odds of ever using cannabis in girls.

=== Gender-affirming care ===
Gender-affirming care for transgender and nonbinary youth can include a large umbrella of services such as mental health resources, use of updated pronouns reflective of their gender identity, hormone therapy, puberty blocking, possible surgery when older, vocal changes, removal of hair, and minimizing their visual sex characteristics. Mental health services and social support such as the use of pronouns or a specific name are forms of care that can be received at any age. Puberty blockers, medication used to pause the bodily developments one experiences during puberty, can be used after puberty begins. Surgery is most commonly performed as an adult, however, it can be received prior to adulthood depending on the circumstances, according to the U.S. Office of Population Affairs. Gender-affirming care for transgender and gender-diverse youth can be especially important. Several studies have found improvements in psychological health and depressive symptoms among those youth that have received puberty blocking or hormone therapy, highlighting a connection between gender-affirming care and mental wellness.

=== Restrictions on gender-affirming care ===
Transgender youth in the United States, as compared to transgender adults, face many legislative restrictions on gender-affirming care. These restrictions have mainly pertained to gender-affirming surgery and hormone replacement therapy. Restrictions on these methods of care vary from state to state. As of June 2026, there are 26 states that have banned both hormone and surgical treatment for transgender youth, as well as six states where it is a felony to practice transgender medical care for transgender youth; South Carolina, Idaho, Florida, Oklahoma, Alabama, and North Dakota. These restrictions have led to backlash from many medical organizations, such as the American Psychological Association, the American Academy of Child and Adolescent Psychiatry, and the Endocrine society.

== See also ==
- Global health
- Health care
- Health equity § LGBTQ health disparities
- Health equity
- Healthcare inequality
- LGBTQ healthcare in the United States Veterans Health Administration
- LGBTQ people in prison
- Mental health of LGBTQ people
- Minority stress and health outcomes among sexual minorities
- Steven Epstein (academic)
- Suicide among LGBTQ people
- Tamsin Wilton
