= Gender bender =

Person who disrupts expected gender roles

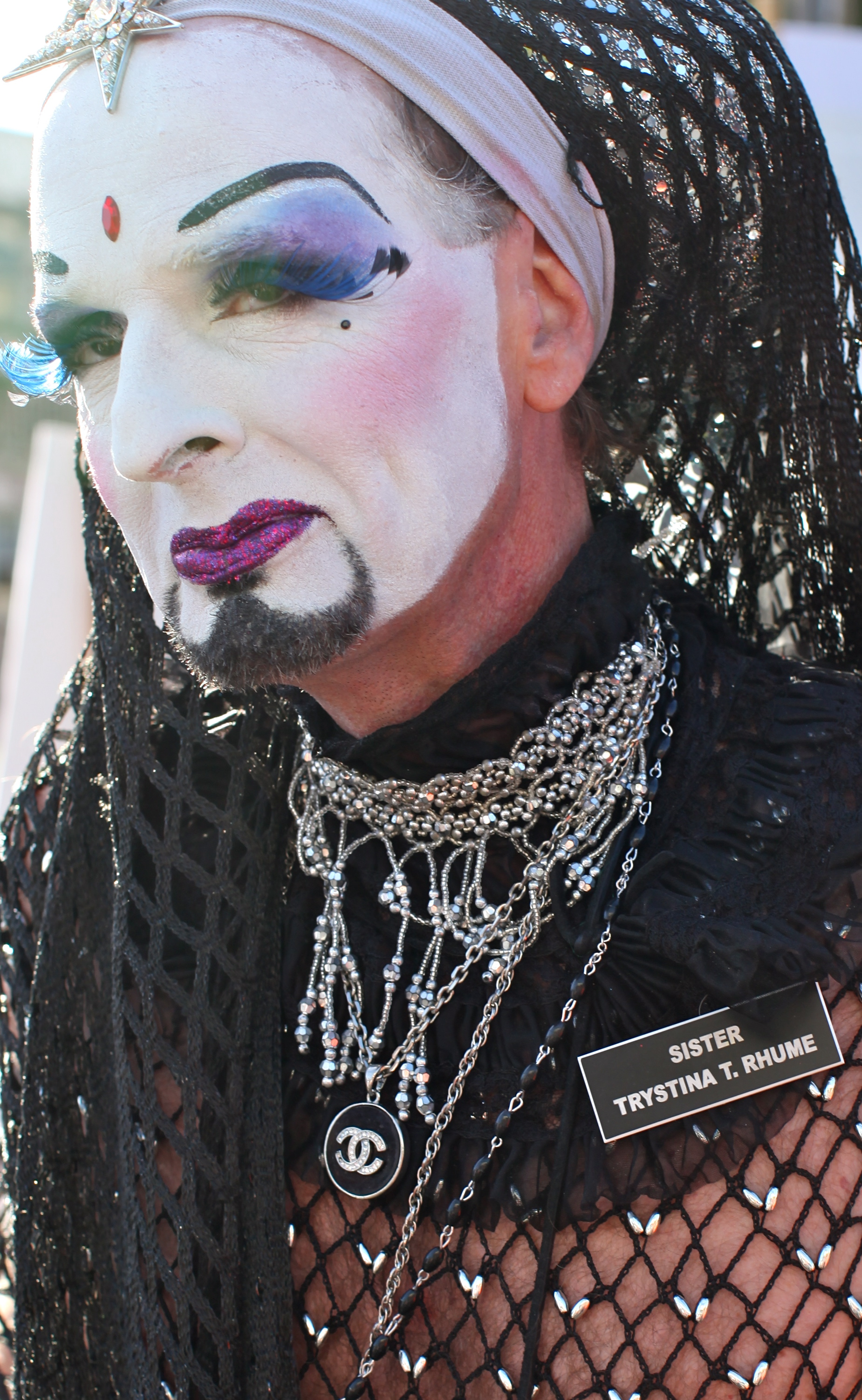
"Sister Trystina T. Rhume" of the genderbend group Sisters of Perpetual Indulgence. Photo from San Francisco, 2012.

A gender bender is a person who dresses and presents themselves in a way that deviates from societal expectations of their gender, especially as the opposite sex. Bending expected gender roles is also called a genderfuck.

The concept of gender bending may have political origins, stemming from movements in the 1960s and 1970s, a guiding principle of which is the idea that the personal is political. Some individuals may choose to engage in gender bending as a form of self-expression or to challenge societal norms; in his 1974 article, Genderfuck and Its Delights, Christopher Lonc explained his motivation for performing genderfuck: "I want to criticize and poke fun at the roles of women and of men too. I want to try [to] show how not-normal I can be. I want to ridicule and destroy the whole cosmology of restrictive sex roles and sexual identification."

The term genderfuck has long been part of the gay vernacular, and started to appear in written documents in the 1970s. Sheidlower cites the definition of the term gender fuck in L Humphreys' 1972 work Out of the Closets: Sociology of Homosexual Liberation as "a form of extended guerilla theatre". Also quoted is the August 1972 issue of Rolling Stone magazine, in reference to the glam rock style: "The new 'macho' transvestism, called vulgarly 'gender-fuck', a curious satire of female impersonation—dresses, pumps, full make-up and beards—is represented by, among others, three men in WAC uniforms and big moustaches".

== Relation to the gender binary ==
Main articles: gender binary, gender roles, gender nonconformity

Gender bending is commonly used as a rebellion against socially constructed expectations of gender and gender roles, which vary widely across cultures, though commonly include some variation of the gender binary.

For example, in Christian and Jewish cultures, gender roles and gender presentation have formed part of scriptural texts and religious teachings for thousands of years: "The woman shall not wear that which pertaineth unto a man, neither shall a man put on a woman's garment; for all that do so are abomination unto the Lord thy God" (KJV, Deut. 22:5). Crossing these lines has been interpreted by some Christians as a moral transgression.

=== Subsidiary cultures ===
Cultures outside of Europe—often indigenous peoples of other nations, or subcultures that exist within Western cultures—may conceptualize gender as having more than two options. These cultures may also see people as being capable of embodying more than one gender role at different times, or of being "in the middle", "embracing both male and female spirit". One such example is the Bugis people of South Sulawesi, Indonesia. People of the Bugis society have a total of five genders. These genders include what would traditionally be seen as cisgender men and women, as well as transgender men and women, and the androgynous Bissu shamans.

== Gender bending in practice ==
Often, parody and exaggeration are used to transgress gender roles, usually to expose them as artificial. For example, a person who engages in gender bending may purposefully exaggerate conventional notions of femininity or masculinity. Gender bending can also be achieved through cross-dressing and androgyny, both of which challenge and contribute to dismantling the gender binary by separating the expression or performance of gender from perceptions of biological or physiological sex. Thus, gender bending protests gender essentialism. This concept is protested not only through non-normative appearance, but by challenging normative gender roles, characteristics, or behaviors as well – for example, a female-bodied individual who is purposefully assertive and nondomestic in order to challenge the notion of essential femininity. Gender bending is based on gender performativity: the concept of gender as a performance. It can be achieved through physical presentation (e.g., clothing, hair, makeup, and secondary sex characteristics), as well as behavior. Because much of gender performance is expressed through clothing, in societies where a gender binary can be observed, there is an established, widespread notion that some clothes are "masculine" and should be worn only by male-bodied individuals, and others are "feminine" and should be worn only by female-bodied individuals. Hawkes, sociologist and author, addresses this "dress code" and the opportunity for resistance: "The universality of [dress] codes and their meanings allows for the [subversion of] the mainstream 'messages' they convey and through this to illuminate the existence of alternative [gender] identities."

=== Cross-dressing and androgyny ===
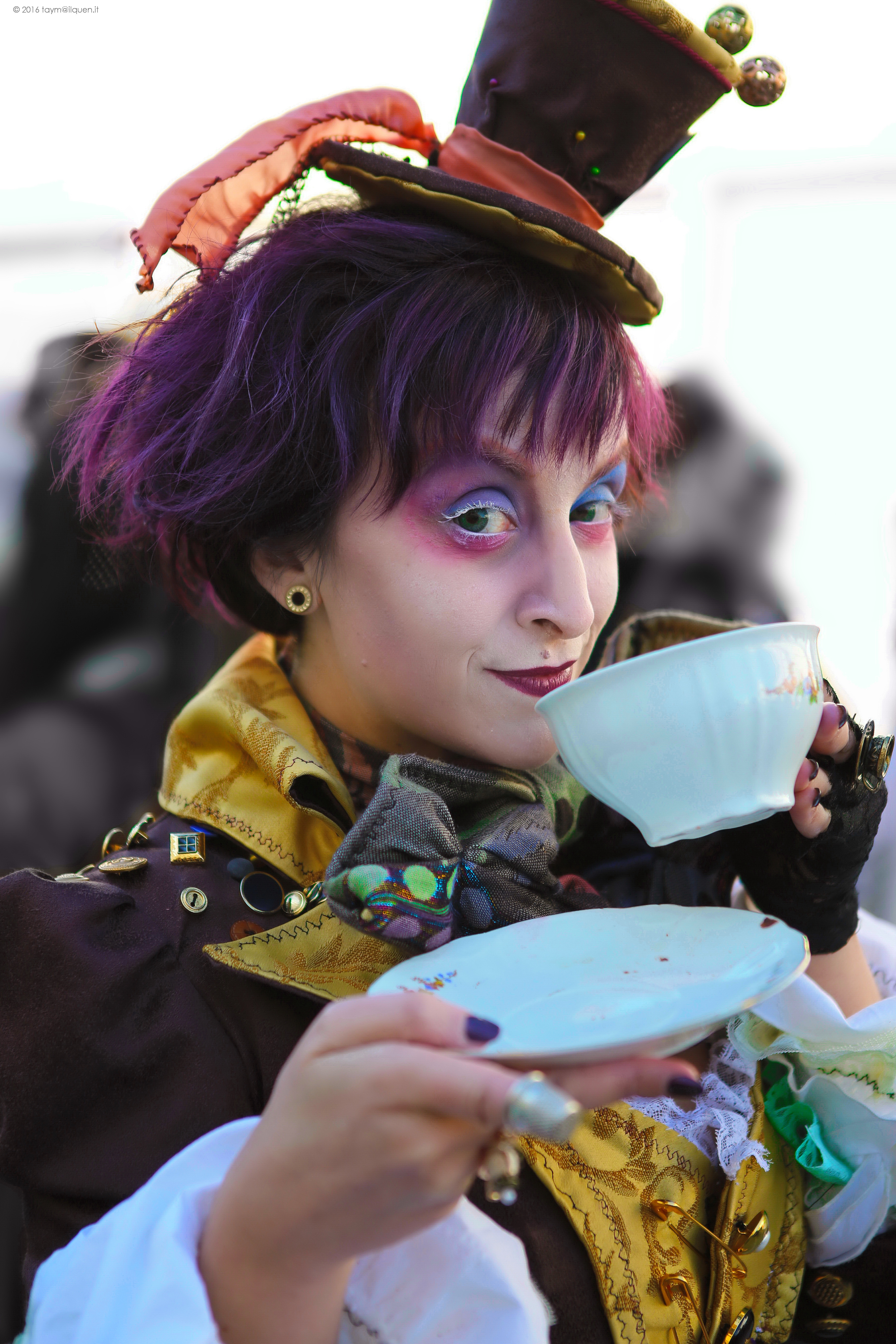
A Mad Hatter cosplayer at the 2016 Romics convention

Cross-dressing would be a form of gender bending because the purpose is to "fuck with gender" roles and presentation. Androgyny is not specifically gender bending, but it can be considered as such if someone is being androgynous on purpose. The origin of the word "androgynous" is from the Greek androgynos: "male and female in one; womanish man; common to men and women". Androgyny as a form of gender expression may present as a blended unification of masculine and feminine traits, with the goal of making one's sex indiscernible, or as a dichotomous mix juxtaposing male and female phenotypes, with the goal of transgressing gender norms.

There are cross-dressers and androgynous people present in popular culture. The rock star Prince cross-dressed and was known for his androgynous look. Eddie Izzard freely talked about her cross-dressing as early as 1992.

Shakespeare used cross-dressing in his performances. Over the centuries, some readers have posited that Shakespeare's sonnets are autobiographical and point to them as evidence of his love for a young man. Shakespeare had characters in his writings that were considered cross-dressers. The four of the five main female characters in his plays were seen as women who cross-dress as men or boys: Cleopatra in Antony and Cleopatra, Portia in The Merchant of Venice, Rosalind in As You Like It, Viola in Twelfth Night.

=== Fashion ===
The Museum of Fine Arts in Boston hosted an exhibit called Gender Bending Fashion. One of the main goals was to explore fashion in a way that confronted gender-norms relating to dress. Gender bending design within this exhibition included clothes traditionally worn by women tailored for men, traditionally men's clothes tailored for women, clothes designed to be gender-ambiguous, and agender clothes designed to be worn by anyone.

=== Drag ===
Drag shows are stage performances where people perform in drag. Drag costuming and makeup may, in some cases, simply involve an actor portraying a character of a sex or gender different from their own, or the performance itself may be a parody or critique of gender and gender roles. Often, "feminine" or "masculine" gender stereotypes of the person's culture are exaggerated for comic or satirical effect. Performers may call themselves drag kings or drag queens. Drag revues typically involve elaborate, glamorous costumes and musical performances. The entertainers may sing, dance, or lip sync.

A faux drag performer is a person who performs as the gender they identify as in day-to-day life, albeit in a usually exaggerated form. For instance, a cisgender woman who performs as a drag queen is a faux queen.

Rupp et al. noted in 2010 that "In order to understand the differences and similarities between gay male drag queens and female-bodied and transgender drag kings and bio queens, we consider how the personal gender and sexual identities of drag performers affect and are affected by their gender performances in drag."

=== Literature ===
Literature, in particular erotica, is another method that has been used to explore genderfuck scenarios. The basis of the literary genre of genderfuck is that it is unimportant whether someone is a man or a woman during the sex act, an idea which challenges, for example the Catholic theology of sexuality. Doris Libetseder points to Carol Queen's short story The Leather Daddy and the Femme, where a lesbian femme uses a strap-on dildo to have sex with a gay leather daddy as a fitting example of the genderfuck genre.

=== Software ===
It was noted as early as May 2019 that the software product Snapchat had photograph filters that make it easy to perform a gender bender on the subjects of photographs, especially those taken on handheld devices like smartphones.

=== Non-political gender bending ===
Gender bending is not always a purposeful political standpoint. According to Butler, gender is something that is performed; it only holds cultural significance to the extent that this is ascribed to it. Despite the gender binary roles society imposes, there are many ways for individuals to express gender variation and not all of them are intentionally political radicalism. Further, in 1995 Tamsin Wilton argued that:

Gender-fuck is not intrinsically radical – otherwise gender-benders such as Boy George, Prince, Annie Lennox, David Bowie etc. would not get away with it to the extent that they do. A politically aware gender-fuck – such as that of RuPaul or (to a limited extent) Madonna – gets much closer to radicalism, but it is only by incorporating a critique of gender as an axis of power that playing about with gender signifiers can be more than wickedly entertaining.

== Judith Butler and gender as performance ==
Judith Butler is a theorist who believes that gender is something that is performed by individuals. Their concept of gender performativity posits that people choose to perform gender in a context in which we are given very few socially acceptable choices, but it can be explained as being similar to what actors do in front of the camera. Due to the importance we place on the belief that men need to act like men and women need to behave like women, it is often believed that gender is an innate attribute and not a social construct. In their article Performative Acts and Gender Constitution: An Essay in Phenomenology and Feminist Theory, Butler explains that if gender is something that sexed bodies assimilate to in order to follow the societal codes of what is appropriate behavior, then those actions can be conceptualized in different ways to allow more flexibility for individuals. In the same article, they assert that in American culture, there is a gender binary along with strict social repercussions against those who act against the "normal" script. This script is policed by harassment, parental pressures to fill expectations, and peer influence. All of these are ways to guarantee that the culture will repeat itself from generation to generation.

Butler's theory about gender roles and their social implications and need for reconstruction is developed in their book, Gender Trouble (1990) in which they argue that the limited acceptance of variation in gender roles does great harm to individual expression. With the limited options for both men and women, there is little room for their combined forces, because men are constantly focused on becoming the financial supporters of their families, which leaves women with the sole option of being the maternal experts they are expected to be. This idea excludes the masculine women or feminine men from being acceptable parental figures for their children because it may lead to a child growing up and conceptualizing the world differently.

== Gender and child raising ==
According to Susan Witt's 1997 study, children generally come to their first conclusions about being male or female from their parents since typically they are the first people the child relates to and the nature of the relationship is intense. Besides parents giving children gender specific clothing, toys, and expectations, there are often many subtle messages about what is acceptable or not regarding gender. Witt's study showed that children that grow up with more androgynous gendered parents are more focused on achievements and typically have a better sense of self. Conversely, in cases of gender nonconformity, when a child exhibits gender performances that are atypical of their prescribed gender role, Kerry Robinson and Cristyn Davies report that a parental figure may respond with hostility. According to Roberts et al. in Pediatrics, people who do not conform to the gender binary are often subject to abuse from society, from within the family and within their community. Types of abuse range from physical and sexual to psychological abuse.

== Examples ==
=== The Cockettes ===
The Cockettes were a psychedelic drag queen troupe, founded in San Francisco in the late 1960s. According to the journal Maledicta in 1987: "Real transvestites and transsexuals are... embarrassed... [by]... The genderfuck Cockettes and such (in dresses and beards)."

=== Marc Bolan ===
Credited as one of the innovators of the early 70's glam rock era, lead singer and guitarist Marc Bolan of rock band T. Rex was dubbed 'feminine looking'. He was known for his volumized curly hair, vibrant wardrobe and experimentation with glittery make-up and eyeliner. As well as this, he wore platform boots and feather boas during his performances.

=== David Bowie and Lou Reed ===
Exploiting his androgynous appearance, rock star David Bowie wore a dress on the UK cover of his 1970 album, The Man Who Sold the World, and often wore dresses, makeup and leotards both onstage and while doing interviews. In a time when very few people were out, he announced he and his wife were both bisexual. In 1972 Bowie co-produced Lou Reed's album Transformer, which includes several gender bending songs, notably the classic, "Walk on the Wild Side".

=== New York Dolls ===
The New York Dolls are a protopunk band, formed in 1971, and were very influential in the early New York City punk rock scene. They broke up in 1977 but reformed in 2004. While they often performed in dresses, long hair and glitter/glam makeup, at least one reviewer called their genderfuck "quite subtle".

=== Rocky Horror (Picture) Show ===
Dr. Frank-N-Furter from the 1973 musical, The Rocky Horror Show, and later the cult film / midnight movie, Rocky Horror Picture Show, is a male-bodied person but wears lingerie, clothing, and accessories considered feminine in the English and American culture of the era. The character also wears heavy make-up influenced by 1940s female film stars like Joan Crawford. In one of the songs featured in the musical Dr. Frank-N-Furter sings, "I'm just a sweet transvestite from Transsexual, Transylvania."

=== Prince ===
Prince wrote many songs that dealt with ambiguity – of gender, of sexuality, and of race. A charismatic entertainer and prolific songwriter, his songs with bisexual content have also been recorded by artists such as Cyndi Lauper, who in "When You Were Mine", sang about sharing a lover with another man, who was in bed with them, "sleeping in between the two of us".

=== Grace Jones ===
According to SheWired, Grace Jones laughs at outside attempts to define her gender identity. Jones herself has said of her gender ambiguity that she feels her masculine side is "a bit stronger". NPR cites her as an influence on Madonna and Lady Gaga.

=== Annie Lennox ===
Singer-songwriter and political activist Annie Lennox began her career as lead singer with The Tourists in the late 1970s. In the 1980s, she fronted synthpop band the Eurythmics but has focused on solo work since the 1990s, with the exception of an album and tour with Eurythmics in 1999. The Spin Alternative Record Guide described her in 1995 as "Gender-fuck goddess Annie Lennox".

=== Phranc ===
The American singer-songwriter and artist Phranc began her career in 1978 with punk band Nervous Gender. In 1985 Village Voice wrote: "Part of Phranc's appeal is the genderfuck of her sweet feminine voice coming from such a masculine frame." She later worked with queercore band Team Dresch.

=== Sisters of Perpetual Indulgence ===
The charity, protest and street performance organization Sisters of Perpetual Indulgence was formed by gay men in 1979, originally using nuns' attire and high camp to draw attention to social conflicts in the Castro, San Francisco. Currently, they fundraise for AIDS and other LGBT causes and promote and educate on safer sex issues. The Cambridge Guide to American Theater identified them as one of the "more anarchic uses of "gender-fuck"... [which]... "parodied traditional drag".

=== Boy George ===
Boy George of the 1980s band Culture Club, has cultivated an androgynous style, and was part of the English New Romantic movement which emerged in the early 1980s. He famously stated, "I can do anything. In GQ, I appeared as a man."

=== RuPaul ===
American drag queen, singer, actor, and host/star of RuPaul's Drag Race, RuPaul got his start by performing in genderfuck, performance art, music videos and punk bands in Atlanta in the late 1980s and early 1990s.

=== It's Pat ===
Pat, a character from the television show Saturday Night Live, served as the basis for the movie It's Pat. The sketches and film feature an androgynous main character, Pat. People are unable to determine Pat's sex, including one male who cannot determine their gender after having sex with Pat while stranded on a deserted island.

=== Marilyn Manson ===
At least one writer says Marilyn Manson's gender-bending rock act "shows trans identities can resonate with the public in a way that cannot be ghettoised". Manson's gender-bending has been compared to that of Alice Cooper and Bowie.

=== Eddie Izzard ===
Eddie Izzard started to freely talk about her transvestism in venues like Edinburgh Festival as early as 1992. Her stance is that cross-dressing is neither part of her performance nor a sexual fetish. She remarks in her show Unrepeatable, "Women wear what they want and so do I." According to Izzard, "Most transvestites fancy women." She identifies as "a straight transvestite or a male lesbian". She has also described herself as "a lesbian trapped in a man's body", transgender, and "a complete boy plus half girl".

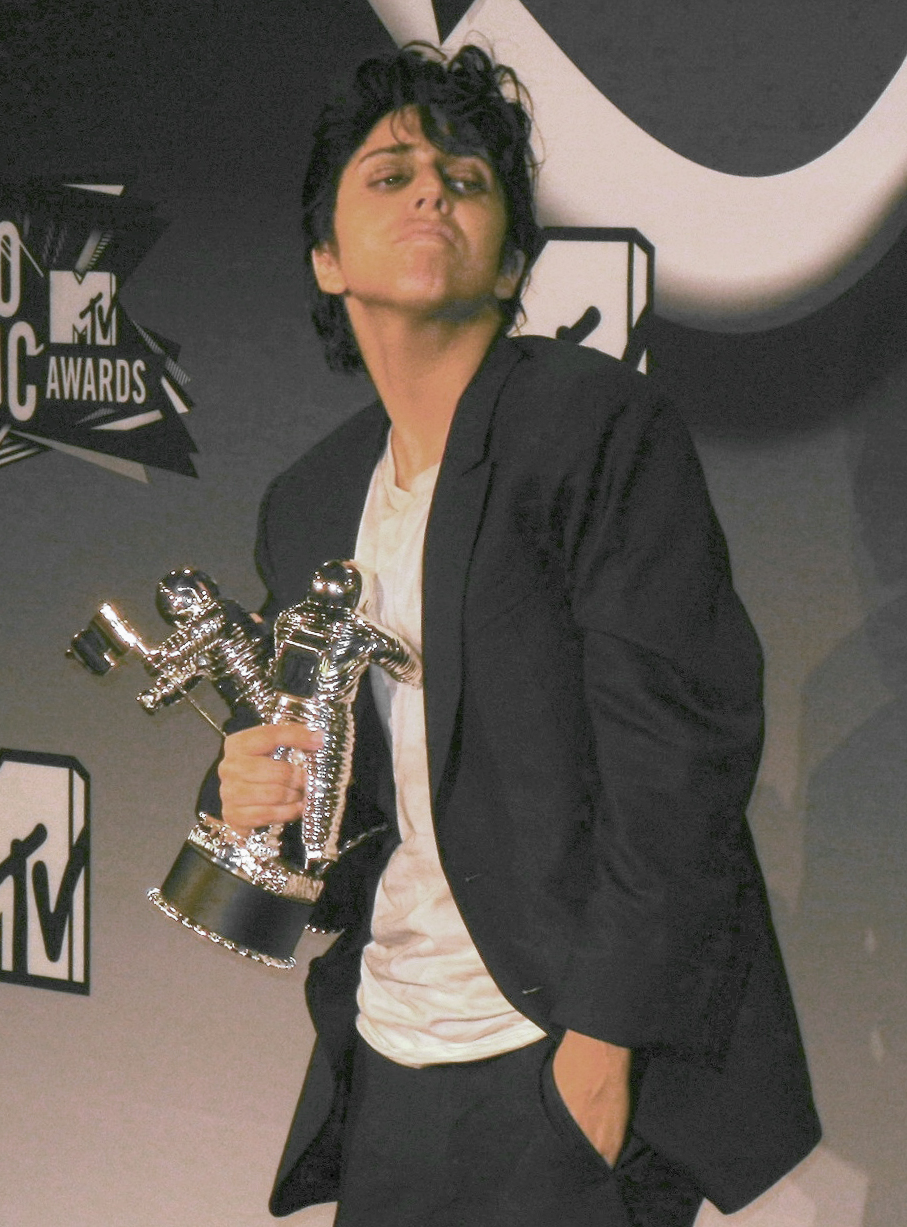
Lady Gaga as Jo Calderone at 2011

=== Lady Gaga ===
Lady Gaga is very specific in what she wears and even states that, "But in a sense, I portray myself in a very androgynous way, and I love androgyny."

== In visual arts media ==
Some films including gender-fuck characters or drag characters are:

- Twelfth Night (1910 film) (1910)
- A Busy Day (1914)
- A Woman (1915)
- Different from the Others (1919)
- Little Old New York (1923)
- The Isle of Love (1923)
- That's My Wife (1929)
- Twice Two (1933)
- Viktor und Viktoria (1933), as well as its remake Victor/Victoria (1982)
- Georges et Georgette (1934)
- Glen or Glenda (1953)
- Some Like It Hot (1959)
- La Dolce Vita (1960)
- Psycho (1960)
- Women of the World (1963)
- Flesh (1968)
- Mondo Trasho (1969)
- Everything You Always Wanted to Know About Sex* (*But Were Afraid to Ask) (1972)
- Pink Flamingos (1972)
- Female Trouble (1974)
- The Rocky Horror Picture Show (1974)
- La Cage aux Folles (1978) as well as its remake The Birdcage (1996)
- Polyester (1981)
- Tootsie (1982)
- Hairspray (1988) as well as the 2007 remake
- Paris Is Burning (1991)
- Silence of the Lambs (1991)
- Mrs. Doubtfire (1993)
- Ed Wood (1994)
- The Adventures of Priscilla, Queen of the Desert (1994)
- To Wong Foo (1995)
- Party Monster (2003)
- J. Edgar (2011)

Anime:

- I My Me! Strawberry Eggs (2001)
- Ouran High School Host Club (2006)
- Himegoto (2014)

Television:

- SheZow (2012)

Manga:

- Fire! (manga)
- Kaze to Ki no Uta
- Sunroom Nite
- The Heart of Thomas

== See also ==
- Coloniality of gender
- Androgyny
- Cross-dressing
- Gender fluidity
- Role reversal
- Rule 63
- Versatile
