= Opioids and pregnancy =

Medical effects and management

Opioid use during pregnancy can have significant implications for both the mother and the developing fetus.

Opioids are a class of drugs that include prescription painkillers (e.g., oxycodone, hydrocodone) and illicit substances like heroin. Opioid use during pregnancy is associated with an increased risk of complications, including an elevated risk of preterm birth, low birth weight, intrauterine growth restriction, and stillbirth. Opioids are substances that can cross the placenta, exposing the developing fetus to the drugs. This exposure can potentially lead to various adverse effects on fetal development, including an increased risk of birth defects. One of the most well-known consequences of maternal opioid use during pregnancy is the risk of neonatal abstinence syndrome (NAS). NAS occurs when the newborn experiences withdrawal symptoms after birth due to exposure to opioids in the womb. Maternal opioid use during pregnancy can also have long-term effects on the child's development. These effects may include cognitive and behavioral problems, as well as an increased risk of substance use disorders later in life. Current guidelines recommend that opioid use disorder in pregnancy be treated with opioid agonist pharmacotherapy consisting of methadone or buprenorphine to substitute for the drug of abuse.

== Pain management and concerns ==
Opioid usage is common among pregnant women and is on the rise. Opioid drugs are used for various reasons during pregnancy, with pain being a frequent issue. Conditions like pelvic and lower back pain, occurring in around 68 to 72% of pregnancies, are commonly treated with these medications. Moreover, other sources of pain like muscle aches, migraines, and joint pain are commonly reported during pregnancy.

However, when it comes to chronic pain, guidelines from the American Pain Society recommend discussing the advantages and disadvantages of chronic opioid therapy with women and, if possible, limiting or avoiding opioid use during pregnancy due to potential risks to the fetus. Even though there is evidence suggesting harmful impacts on fetal development caused by prescription opioids, research conducted in both Europe and the United States consistently shows elevated levels of prescription opioid use during pregnancy, whether it's for medical reasons or due to opioid dependency. It's important to note that prescription opioids encompass a range of medications, and the potential effects on the fetus may differ between different medications within the same drug class.

== Complications ==
Opioids can cross both the placental and blood-brain barriers, which poses risks to fetuses and newborns exposed to these drugs before birth. This exposure to opioids during pregnancy can lead to potential obstetric complications, including spontaneous abortion, abruption of the placenta, pre-eclampsia, prelabor rupture of membranes, and fetal death. There are also adverse outcomes in newborns associated with maternal opioid use during pregnancy, such as sudden infant death syndrome, being smaller than expected for their gestational age, preterm birth, lower birth weight, and reduced head size. Neonatal abstinence syndrome is a commonly observed issue in newborns who were exposed to opioids before birth.

=== Birth defects ===
The use of opioids in the early stages of pregnancy is associated with an elevated risk of congenital anomalies. Specifically, there is a two-fold increased likelihood of certain birth defects, including congenital heart defects, gastroschisis, and neural tube defects. The risk of preterm birth and neonatal complications is reduced to some extent when dextropropoxyphene or codeine is used in comparison to other opioid analgesics.

=== Neurodevelopment ===
The potential impact on the neurodevelopment of infants exposed to opioids before birth is another significant concern. A recent meta-analysis revealed noteworthy deficiencies in cognitive, psychomotor, and behavioral abilities in infants and preschool-aged children who had experienced chronic intrauterine opioid exposure. Children who experienced neonatal abstinence syndrome were notably more prone to hospitalizations due to cognitive impairments, communication, speech, or language disorders, autism spectrum disorder, and behavioral problems, particularly those concerning emotional control.

=== Neonatal withdrawal ===
Neonatal abstinence syndrome occurs when newborns go through withdrawal from opiates and is linked to dysfunction in the central and autonomic nervous systems, the respiratory system, and the gastrointestinal tract. Additionally, there is an elevated risk of neonatal abstinence syndrome associated with the medical use of certain opioid analgesics, such as tramadol, codeine, and propoxyphene.

== Management ==
Pregnant women with opioid use disorder have treatment options including methadone, naltrexone, or buprenorphine to decrease opioid usage and enhance treatment adherence. Current guidelines suggest that methadone and buprenorphine are equally viable choices. Nevertheless, recent research suggests that buprenorphine may offer certain advantages over methadone. Current guidelines recommend that pregnant women with opioid use disorder be treated with opioid agonist pharmacotherapy consisting of methadone or buprenorphine to substitute for the drug of abuse.

== See also ==
- Alcohol and pregnancy
- Cannabis in pregnancy
