= Tamsin Wilton =

English activist

- Born: 1952; Redruth, Cornwall, England
- Died: 30 April 2006 (aged 53–54); Redruth, Cornwall, England
- Education: University of Exeter; University of the West of England
- Scientific career
- Fields: Human sexuality, LGBT health, HIV/AIDS
- Workplaces: University of the West of England
- Doctoral advisor: Peter Aggleton

Tamsin Elizabeth Wilton (1952 – 30 April 2006) was an English lesbian activist, and the UK’s first Professor of Human Sexuality. She researched and wrote extensively about gay and lesbian health, the process of transitioning to lesbianism, and the marginalisation of lesbian issues within sexuality studies.

== Early career and entry into academia ==
Wilton took her first degree in English and Fine art at the University of Exeter, Devon in 1973, and trained as a school teacher. Initially she taught in a state school for five years, then managed a bookshop, then worked at the Arnolfini arts centre and a Service Nine voluntary agency, both in Bristol. from there she became involved in HIV voluntary work with the Aled Richards Trust Women and AIDS group. She also contributed cartoons to magazines, publishers and television companies. Her marriage ended in 1988, and she had to look after her young son Tom alone. In 1990 she began studying for a master's degree in Gender and Social policy and began research on the social aspects of HIV/AIDS with Peter Aggleton's team at Bristol Polytechnic (renamed University of the West of England) from where she published the first paper in her fifteen-year career as a lesbian feminist academic. She was appointed as the Director of the HIV/AIDS Social Research Unit at located within the faculty of Nursing Health and Applied Social Sciences, and later the faculty of Social Sciences.

== Sexuality in life and work ==
In the late 1980s Wilton came out as a lesbian, which gave her a strong sense of identity and politics as well as informing her intellectual work, although she never felt completely accepted by lesbians who had come out earlier in life because of her personal history of heterosexuality. She wrote in 1993, "the positionality of "lesbian" offers a potent site from which to investigate the social, cultural and political interlocution of gender and sexuality". She saw herself as having a distinctly lesbian perspective on the issues she researched in a way that challenged the assumptions of colleagues and gay men, particularly in relation to gendered behaviour. In the lesbian edition of Sexualities (3[2], May 2000), Wilton noted the marginalisation of lesbian issues within sexuality studies and the journal. This conflictual approach was contra-punctuated by a warms in her personal relationships, which embodied a strong sense of solidarity with co-workers on sexuality, especially with gay men. She was keen to rework the debates on the relationship between gender and sexuality, and sought to integrate them as a focus for interdisciplinary study that included health policy, film theory, sociology of sexuality, as well as feminist and queer theory. Wilton's writing was aimed at both academic and lay audiences. Her published material reflected theoretical work on sexuality aimed at academics, a book designed for practitioner training, an introductory text for policy makers, discussion about the self-fashioning required by women who transition from heterosexuality to lesbianism, books for lay members of the communities involved in her research, and an edited volume on lesbians and film.

She spoke about her research on women who come out as lesbians after living as a heterosexual, and their reluctance to talk about this, in the Observer newspaper: "There is likely to be a fear of judgment from lesbians. There's a thing called heterosexual privilege that the heterosexual community doesn't know about. It's the ability to move freely in the world in a way that assumes that heterosexuality is natural. You don't have people asking you questions about how you got to be that way. You don't have to watch your back when you hold your lover's hand in public."

== Professorial and posthumous recognition ==
In 2005 Wilton became Professor of Human Sexuality at the Sociology School at UWE in recognition of her achievements, which itself was remarkable given she had only begun to embark on an academic career fifteen years earlier. She was a valued 'special' member of the Gay and Lesbian Association of Doctors and Dentists (GLADD), and was instrumental in establishing the first National LGBT Health Summit at Cardiff in 2006. Wilton died from an aneurysm on 30 April 2006 not long after moving back to her native Cornwall.

In 2007 the LGBT Health Summit established an LGBT Health Community Award in her name; there was some objection to this from within the transgender community, as she had twice written material which appeared to cast transsexuals in a bad light. The objections were noted and discussed, and the award continued to be established in her name.

== Bibliography ==
=== LGBT health ===
- Aggleton, P. Hart, G. Davies, P; AIDS—responses, interventions and care; Taylor & Francis (1991)
- Wilton, T; Antibody Politic: AIDS and Society; New Clarion Press (1992)
- Wilton, T. Doyal, L. Naidoo, J; AIDS: Setting A Feminist Agenda; Taylor and Francis (1994)
- Wilton, T. Warwick, I. Whitty, G; When it Matters....: Developing HIV and AIDS Education and Young Homeless People; Health Education Authority (1994)
- Wilton, T; EnGendering AIDS: Deconstructing Sex, Text and Epidemic; SAGE Publications (1997)
- Wilton, T; Safe sex, safer publishers; The Times Higher Education (23 June 1995)
- Wilton, T; Towards an understanding of the cultural roots of homophobia to provide a better midwifery service for lesbian clients; Midwifery, Vol 15 issue 3; Harcourt Publishers (1999)
- Wilton, T; Good for You: A Handbook on Lesbian Health and Wellbeing; Cassell (1999).
- Wilton, T; Sexuality in Health; Open University Press (2000)
- Wilton, T. Kaufmann, T; Lesbian mothers' experiences of maternity care in the UK; Midwifery, Vol 17 issue 3; Harcourt Publishers (2001)

=== Lesbianism ===
- Wilton, T; Our Master's Voice? On Not Getting Away with 'Lesbian Studies'; Sage, London: Feminism & Psychology, Vol. 3: pp. 139 – 141 (Feb 1993)
- Griffin, C; Response to Tamsin Wilton: `Our Master's Voice'; Sage, London: Feminism & Psychology, Vol. 3: pp. 142 – 144 (Feb 1993)
- Wilton, T; Lesbian Studies: Setting an Agenda; Routledge (1995)
- Wilton, T; Finger Licking Good: The Ins and Outs of Lesbian Sex; Cassell Academic (1996).
- Wilton, T. Farquhar, C; Assume the Lesbian Position; Sage, London: Sexualities, vol. 3: pp. 131 – 132 (May 2000)
- Wilton, T; Unexpected Pleasures: Leaving Heterosexuality for the Lesbian Life; Diva (2002).
- Deakin, N. Jones Finer, C. Matthews, B; Welfare and the state: critical concepts in political science; Taylor & Francis (2004)

=== Feminism ===
- Hinds, H. Phoenix, A. Stacey, J; Working Out: new directions for women's studies; Routledge (1992)
- Wilton, T; Sisterhood in the Service of Patriarchy: Heterosexual Women's Friendships and Male Power; Sage, London: Feminism & Psychology, Vol. 2, No. 3, pages 506–509 (1992)
- Kennedy, M. Lubelska, C. Walsh, V; Making Connections: Women's Studies, Women's Movements, Women's Lives; Taylor & Francis (1993)
- Griffin G; Feminist activism in the 1990s; Taylor & Francis (1995)

=== Human sexuality ===
- Wilton, T. Katz, J. Corrine, T; Intimacies; Last Gasp (2002)
- Wilton, T; Sexual (Dis)Orientation: Gender, Sex, Desire and Self-Fashioning; Palgrave MacMillan (2004).
- Wilton, T; Sex and Sexuality: A Multidisciplinary Introduction; Routledge (2006)

=== Transgender issues ===
- Wilton, T; Out/Performing Our Selves: Sex, Gender and Cartesian Dualism; Sage, London: Sexualities, May 2000; vol. 3: pp. 237 – 254
- Hird, M; Out/Performing Our Selves: Invitation for Dialogue; Sage, London: Sexualities, Aug 2002; vol. 5: pp. 337 – 356
- Wilton, T; `You Think This Song is About You': Reply to Hird; Sage, London: Sexualities, Aug 2002; vol. 5: pp. 357 – 361

=== Film studies ===
- Wilton, T; Immortal Invisible: Lesbians and the Moving Image; Routledge (1995)

=== Illustrations ===
- Aggleton, P. Rivers, K. Warwick, I. Wilton, T; AIDS: Working with Young People; AVERT (1993)
- Hague, G. Malos, E. Wilton, T; Domestic Violence: Action for Change; New Clarion Press (1993)
