= Polysubstance =

Dependence on a combined use of drugs

Polysubstance was used in the American Psychiatric Association's Diagnostic and Statistical Manual for Mental Disorders (DSM-IV 1994) to refer to three or more drugs (including alcohol) to which an individual has become dependent (i.e., meets the diagnostic criteria for substance dependence). The criteria were changed in the DSM-5. In the DSM-IV nosology, polysubstance dependence (diagnostic code 304.80) indicated that the use of any one of the substances did not meet the diagnostic criteria for substance dependence while the combined use of the drugs did meet substance dependence diagnostic criteria.

Two research studies sought to determine if polysubstance dependence patients differ in any important ways from patients with a single-drug substance dependence but each study defined polysubstance dependence differently, making comparisons difficult.
