= Treatment and management of addiction =

Treatment and management of addiction encompasses the range of approaches aimed at helping individuals overcome addiction, most commonly in the form of DSM-5 diagnosed substance use disorders, or behavioral addictions such as problematic gambling and social media addiction. Treatment is one of the recovery pathways that individuals can follow to resolve their addiction and other related problems, as opposed to natural recovery, depending on how severe the addiction is.

Treatment of substance use disorders can start with detoxification if needed, to manage physical and psychological health when severe withdrawal symptoms are expected to occur. Common addiction treatment therapies are counseling, cognitive behavioral therapy (CBT), medication-assisted treatment, twelve-step programs and other types of support groups, some of which in dedicated treatment facilities. Therapies address both the physical and psychological aspects of addiction, recognizing it as a chronic but treatable condition. Recent discoveries in the fields of neurological and biotechnology promise more effective treatments for addiction. Some studies on deep-brain stimulation show promising results, next to implants for opioid users. Also vaccine research is being carried out to improve treatment for addictions

Effective treatment often includes a combination of medical, psychological, and social interventions tailored to the specific needs of the individual. A sociological approach to the treatment of addiction puts an emphasis on the social determinants of developing addiction to recovery and wellbeing. It considers the dynamic and reciprocal relationships that are of importance to the individual's experience. Unsuccessful treatment can happen because of discontinuation of treatment, with retention rates ranging from 17%-57%. The occurrence of one or more relapses, also account for unsuccessful treatment.

The goal of addiction treatment is to reduce dependence, achieve partial or full abstinence and improve the quality of life by a process of personal growth, while making behavioral changes or changes to the personal environment that support sustainable recovery. The transtheoretical model (TTM) can be used to determine when treatment can begin and which method will be most effective. If treatment begins too early, it can cause a person to become defensive and resistant to change. The rate of successful lifetime recovery is around 50%, a metastudy on 415 reports (1868–2011) showed.

== Behavioral therapy ==
CBT proposes four assumptions essential to the approach to treatment: addiction is a learned behavior, it emerges in an environmental context, it is developed and maintained by particular thought patterns and processes, and CBT can be integrated well with other treatment and management approaches as they all have similar goals. CBT, (e.g., relapse prevention), motivational interviewing, and a community reinforcement approach are effective interventions with moderate effect sizes.

Interventions focusing on impulsivity and sensation seeking are successful in decreasing substance use. Cue exposure uses ideas from classical conditioning theory to change the learned behavioral response of someone addicted to a cue or trigger. Contingency management uses ideas from operant conditioning to use meaningful positive reinforcements to influence addiction behaviors towards sobriety.

Addiction recovery groups draw on different methods and models and rely on the success of vicarious learning, where people imitate behavior they observe as rewarding among their own social group or status as well as those perceived as being of a higher status.

Substance addiction in children is complex and requires multifacted behavioral therapy. Family therapy and school-based interventions have had minor but lasting results. Innovative treatments are still needed for areas where relevant therapies are unavailable.

Consistent aerobic exercise, especially endurance exercise (e.g., marathon running), prevents the development of certain drug addictions and is an effective adjunct treatment for drug addiction, and for psychostimulant addiction in particular. Consistent aerobic exercise magnitude-dependently (i.e., by duration and intensity) reduces drug addiction risk, which appears to occur through the reversal of drug induced addiction-related neuroplasticity. Exercise may prevent the development of drug addiction by altering ΔFosB or c-Fos immunoreactivity in the striatum or other parts of the reward system. Aerobic exercise decreases drug self-administration, reduces the likelihood of relapse, and induces opposite effects on striatal dopamine receptor D_{2} (DRD2) signaling (increased DRD2 density) to those induced by addictions to several drug classes (decreased DRD2 density). Consequently, consistent aerobic exercise may lead to better treatment outcomes when used as an adjunct treatment for drug addiction.

== Medication ==
=== Alcohol addiction ===
Alcohol, like opioids, can induce a severe state of physical dependence and produce withdrawal symptoms such as delirium tremens. Because of this, treatment for alcohol addiction usually involves a combined approach dealing with dependence and addiction simultaneously. Benzodiazepines have the largest and the best evidence base in the treatment of alcohol withdrawal and are considered the gold standard of alcohol detoxification.

Pharmacological treatments for alcohol addiction include drugs like naltrexone (opioid antagonist), disulfiram, acamprosate, and topiramate. Rather than substituting for alcohol, these drugs are intended to affect the desire to drink, either by directly reducing cravings as with acamprosate and topiramate, or by producing unpleasant effects when alcohol is consumed, as with disulfiram. These drugs can be effective if treatment is maintained, but compliance can be an issue as patients with disordered alcohol use may forget to take their medication, or discontinue use because of excessive side effects. The opioid antagonist naltrexone has been shown to be an effective treatment for alcoholism, with the effects lasting three to twelve months after the end of treatment.

=== Behavioral addictions ===
Behavioral addiction is a treatable condition. Treatment options include psychotherapy and psychopharmacotherapy (i.e., medications) or a combination of both. Cognitive behavioral therapy (CBT) is the most common form of psychotherapy used in treating behavioral addictions; it focuses on identifying patterns that trigger compulsive behavior and making lifestyle changes to promote healthier behaviors. Because cognitive behavioral therapy is considered a short-term therapy, the number of sessions for treatment normally ranges from five to twenty. During the session, therapists will lead patients through the topics of identifying the issue, becoming aware of one's thoughts surrounding the issue, identifying any negative or false thinking, and reshaping said negative and false thinking. While CBT does not cure behavioral addiction, it does help with coping with the condition in a healthy way. Currently, there are no medications approved for treatment of behavioral addictions in general, but some medications used for treatment of drug addiction may also be beneficial with specific behavioral addictions.

Another form of treatment is recreational therapy. A Certified Therapeutic Recreation Specialist (CTRS) uses leisure and recreation to help individuals recover from their injuries, ailments, or addictions. Therapeutic recreation can help an individual struggling with addiction to improve their self-esteem, confidence, motivation, resiliency, autonomy, enjoyment, and overall emotional state.

=== Cannabinoid addiction ===
The development of CB_{1} receptor agonists that have reduced interaction with β-arrestin 2 signaling might be therapeutically useful. As of 2019, there has been some evidence of effective pharmacological interventions for cannabinoid addiction, but none have been approved.

=== Nicotine addiction ===
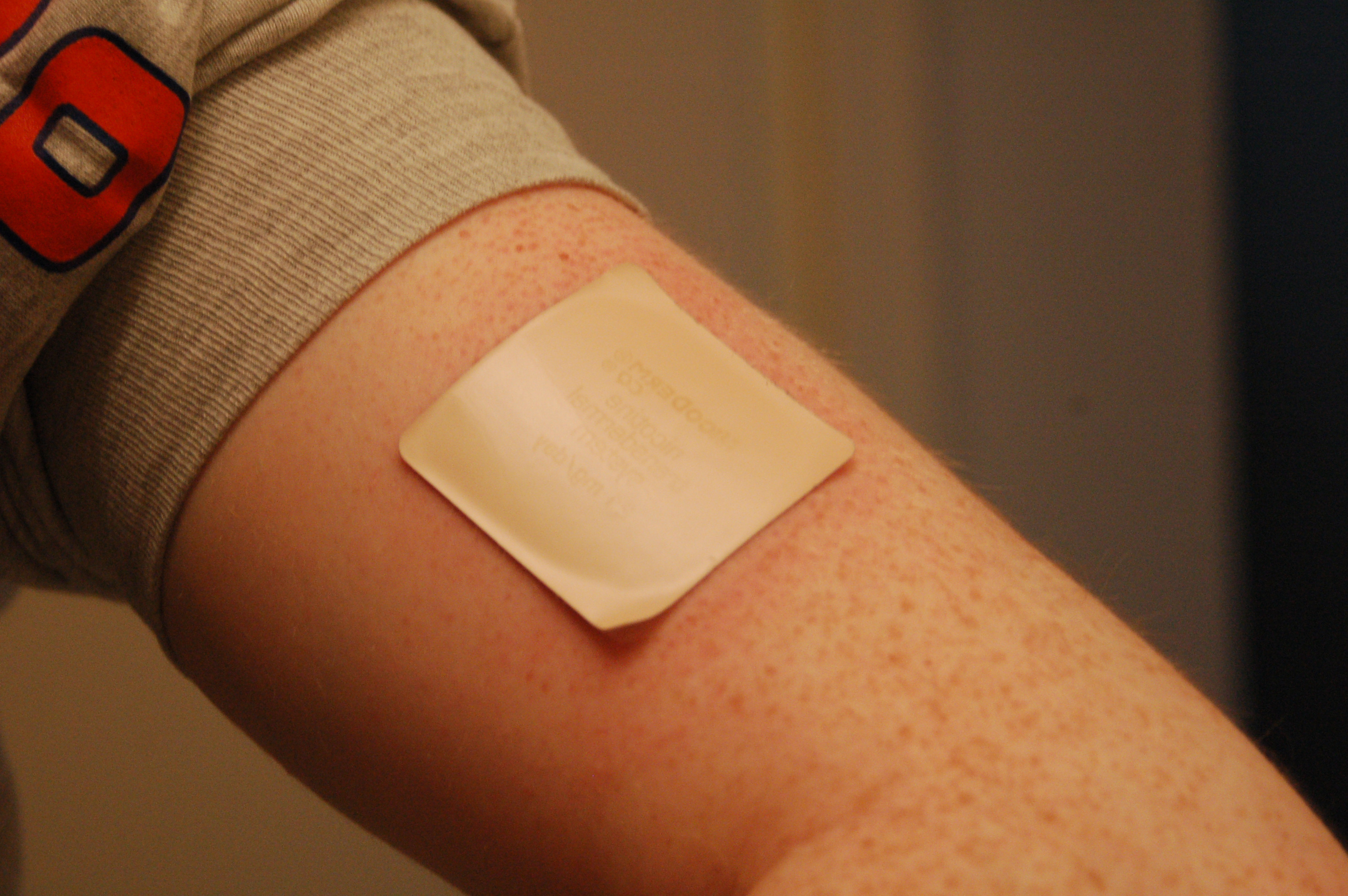
Transdermal patch used in nicotine replacement therapy

Another area in which drug treatment has been widely used is in the treatment of nicotine addiction, which usually involves the use of nicotine replacement therapy, nicotinic receptor antagonists, and/or nicotinic receptor partial agonists. Examples of drugs that act on nicotinic receptors and have been used for treating nicotine addiction include antagonists like bupropion and the partial agonist varenicline. Cytisine, a partial agonist, is an effective, and affordable cessation treatment for smokers. When access to varenicline and nicotine replacement therapy is limited (due to availability or cost), cytisine is considered the first line of treatment for smoking cessation.

=== Opioid addiction ===
Opioids cause physical dependence and treatment typically addresses both dependence and addiction. Physical dependence is treated using replacement drugs such as buprenorphine (sold as Suboxone in combination with naloxone) and methadone. Although these drugs perpetuate physical dependence, the goal of opioid maintenance is to provide a measure of control over both pain and cravings. Use of replacement drugs increases the addicted individual's ability to function normally and eliminates the negative consequences of obtaining controlled substances illicitly. Once a prescribed dosage is stabilized, treatment enters maintenance or tapering phases. In the United States, opioid replacement therapy is tightly regulated in methadone clinics and under the DATA 2000 legislation. In some countries, other opioid derivatives such as dihydrocodeine, dihydroetorphine, and even heroin are used as substitute drugs for illegal street opioids, with different prescriptions being given depending on the needs of the individual patient. Baclofen has led to successful reductions of cravings for stimulants, alcohol, and opioids and alleviates alcohol withdrawal syndrome. Some studies show the interconnection between opioid drug detoxification and overdose mortality.

=== Psychostimulant addiction ===
There is no effective and FDA- or EMA-approved pharmacotherapy for any form of psychostimulant addiction. Experimental TAAR1-selective agonists have significant therapeutic potential as a treatment for psychostimulant addictions.

=== Research ===
Anti-drug vaccines (active immunizations) for treatment of cocaine and nicotine addictions were successful in animal studies. Vaccines tested on humans have been shown as safe with mild to moderate side effects, though did not have firm results confirming efficacy despite producing expected antibodies. Vaccines which use anti-drug monoclonal antibodies (passive immunization) can mitigate drug-induced positive reinforcement by preventing the drug from moving across the blood–brain barrier. Current vaccine-based therapies are only effective in a relatively small subset of individuals. As of November 2015, vaccine-based therapies are being tested in human clinical trials as a treatment for addiction and preventive measure against drug overdoses involving nicotine, cocaine, and methamphetamine. The study shows that the vaccine may save lives during a drug overdose. In this instance, the idea is that the body will respond to the vaccine by quickly producing antibodies to prevent the opioids from accessing the brain.

Vaccinations against addiction specifically overlaps with the belief that memory plays a large role in the damaging effects of addiction and relapses. Hapten conjugate vaccines are designed to block opioid receptors in one area, while allowing other receptors to behave normally. Essentially, once a high can no longer be achieved in relation to a traumatic event, the relation of drugs to a traumatic memory can be disconnected and therapy can play a role in treatment.

Sociological research aims to pronounce the individual lived experiences of women receiving medication-assisted treatment (e.g., methadone, naltrexone, burprenorphine) in a long-term rehabilitation setting, through a twenty month long ethnographic fieldwork investigation. This person-centered research shows how the experiences of these women "emerge from stable systems of inequality based in intersectional gender, race, and class marginalization entangled with processes of intra-action." Viewing addiction treatment through this lens highlights the importance of framing clients' own bodies as "social flesh". It is pointed out that "client bodies" as well as the "embodied experiences of self and social belonging emerge in and through the structures, temporalities, and expectations of the treatment centre."

Since addiction involves abnormalities in glutamate and GABAergic neurotransmission, receptors associated with these neurotransmitters (e.g., AMPA receptors, NMDA receptors, and GABA_{B} receptors) are potential therapeutic targets for addictions. N-acetylcysteine (NAC), which affects metabotropic glutamate receptors and NMDA receptors, has shown some benefit involving addictions to cocaine, heroin, and cannabinoids. It may be useful as an adjunct therapy for addictions to amphetamine-type stimulants, but more clinical research is required.

Current medical reviews of research involving lab animals have identified a drug class – class I histone deacetylase inhibitors (Note: Inhibitors of class I histone deacetylase (HDAC) enzymes are drugs that inhibit four specific histone-modifying enzymes: HDAC1, HDAC2, HDAC3, and HDAC8. Most of the animal research with HDAC inhibitors has been conducted with four drugs: butyrate salts (mainly sodium butyrate), trichostatin A, valproic acid, and SAHA; butyric acid is a naturally occurring short-chain fatty acid in humans, while the latter two compounds are FDA-approved drugs with medical indications unrelated to addiction.) – that indirectly inhibits the function and further increases in the expression of accumbal ΔFosB by inducing G9a expression in the nucleus accumbens after prolonged use. These reviews and subsequent preliminary evidence which used oral administration or intraperitoneal administration of the sodium salt of butyric acid or other class I HDAC inhibitors for an extended period indicate that these drugs have efficacy in reducing addictive behavior in lab animals (Note: Specifically, prolonged administration of a class I HDAC inhibitor appears to reduce an animal's motivation to acquire and use an addictive drug without affecting an animal's motivation to attain other rewards (i.e., it does not appear to cause motivational anhedonia) and reduce the amount of the drug that is self-administered when it is readily available.) that have developed addictions to ethanol, psychostimulants (i.e., amphetamine and cocaine), nicotine, and opiates. Few clinical trials involving humans with addictions and any HDAC class I inhibitors have been conducted to test for treatment efficacy in humans or identify an optimal dosing regimen. (Note: Among the few clinical trials that employed a class I HDAC inhibitor, one used valproate for methamphetamine addiction.)

Gene therapy for addiction is an active area of research. One line of gene therapy research involves the use of viral vectors to increase the expression of dopamine D_{2} receptor proteins in the brain.

== See also ==
- Addiction recovery groups
- Cognitive behavioral therapy
- Drug rehabilitation

== Notes ==
Image legend
