= Indivior =

Specialty pharmaceuticals company

- Company type: Public company
- Traded as: LSE: INDV; Nasdaq: INDV; S&P 600 component
- Industry: Pharmaceutical
- Founded: 1994
- Headquarters: Chesterfield County, Virginia
- Key people: Graham Hetherington, Chairman; Mark Crossley, CEO
- Products: Subutex/Subuxone/Sublocade
- Revenue: ▲$1,093 million (2022)
- Operating income: ▲$(4) million (2022)
- Net income: ▲$2 million (2023)
- Website: www.indivior.com

Indivior is an American pharmaceuticals company. Established as a division of Reckitt Benckiser in 1994 and demerged from that company in December 2014, it is focussed on substitution products for opioid addiction. It is listed on the London Stock Exchange and on the NASDAQ Global Select Market.

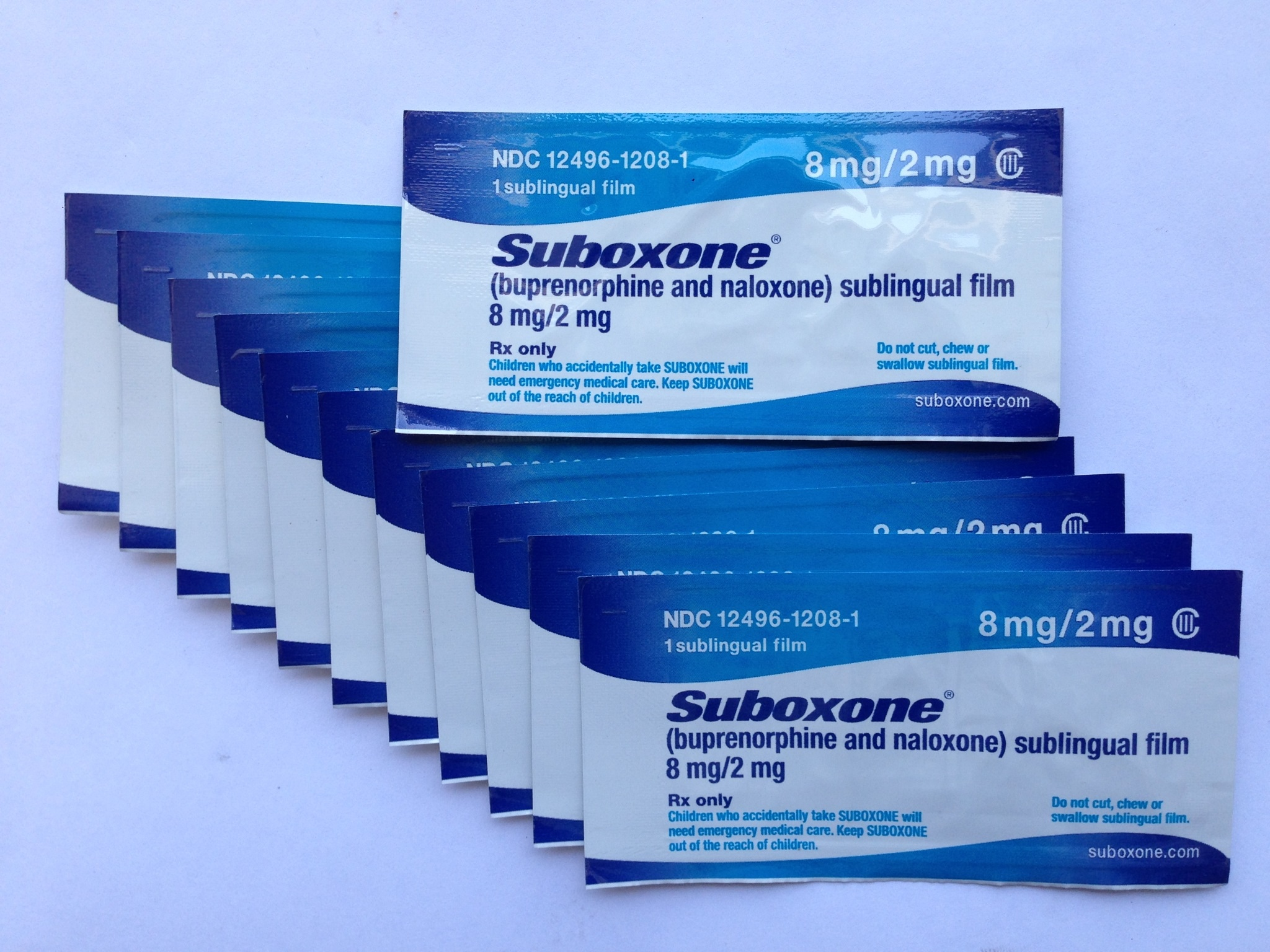
Suboxone sublingual Tablets

== History ==
The company was established as the Buprenorphine division of Reckitt Benckiser in 1994. In December 2014, Reckitt Benckiser spun off its specialty pharmaceuticals business into a separate company named Indivior. By February 2015, the company was capitalised at £2.3 billion (US$3.1 billion) on the London Stock Exchange.

In 2019, Indivior was indicted over claims that it had made false marketing claims about the safety of its drug, Suboxone, and had concocted a scheme to direct patients towards doctors who were likely to prescribe Suboxone. Reckitt Benckiser has settled with the Justice Department to pay $1.4 billion to resolve a U.S. Federal investigation into sales and marketing of opioid addiction treatment.

In July 2020, Indivior Solutions, Indivior Inc., and Indivior PLC agreed to pay $600 million to resolve liability related to false marketing of Suboxone to MassHealth for use by patients with children under the age of six years old. Additionally, Indivior Solutions Inc pleaded guilty to one-count of felony information.

In November 2022, it was announced Indivior had acquired the Santa Monica-headquartered, NASDAQ-listed biopharmaceutical company, Opiant.

In June 2023, the company listed its shares on both the US Nasdaq and UK London Stock Exchange.

In July 2023, Indivior paid $20.4 million to C4X Discovery for the full rights to the orexin-1 receptor antagonist being developed for substance use disorder. Indivior had already made an upfront payment of $10 million in 2018 and pledged milestone payments of up to $284 million. Under the new agreement C4X Discovery waived any rights to further payment.

In May 2024, the company confirmed that it would transfer its primary share listing to the US, with its UK listing becoming secondary.

In February 2025, the company announced the appointment of Joe Ciaffoni as its chief executive, replacing Mark Crossley.

In June 2025, Indivior delisted from the UK's stock exchange but retained its US listing.

== Operations ==
The company's main products are Sublocade, Subutex and its Naloxone-combined preparation Suboxone, both substitution products for opioid addiction. Other products include remedies for cocaine and opioid analgesic overdose and treatment for alcohol dependence: the company claims this to be the largest pipeline of addiction drugs in the world.
