= Opioid agonist therapy =

Treatment for opioid use disorder

Opioid agonist therapy (OAT) is a treatment in which prescribed opioid agonists are given to patients who live with opioid use disorder (OUD). Medications for Opioid Use Disorder (MOUD) such as methadone, buprenorphine, and naloxone reduce morbidity and mortality.

The benefits of this treatment include a roughly 50% reduction in mortality among people with opioid use disorder, decreased substance use, improvements in social functioning, increased rates of retention in rehabilitative programs, more manageable withdrawal experience, cognitive improvement, and lower HIV transmission.

The length of OAT varies from one individual to another based on their physiology, environmental surroundings, and quality of life. Despite its many benefits, only a small fraction (around one-fifth) of those who need this treatment are actually receiving it.

== Terminology ==
MOUD has taken hold in the literature as the preferred terminology for such evidence-based treatments. Synonymous or overlapping terms that may appear in professional or popular literature include medication-assisted treatment (MAT), opioid substitute therapy, opioid replacement therapy, and methadone maintenance therapy.

== Biological understanding ==
An opioid is considered a ligand, which is an ion or a molecule. An opioid ligand travels to the brain and attaches itself to an opioid receptor, which begins the effects of opioids. The mesolimbic system, which is the biological system that moderates the feeling of reward generated by dopamine, is the main system that is affected by opioids. Opioids stimulate the mesolimbic system to release a large amount of dopamine in the brain, which increases the effects of opioids: euphoria and numbness. The difference between an opioid and an opioid agonist is that opioids induce more intense effects and stay in the brain for a short amount of time. Conversely, an opioid agonist induces minimal effects and stays in the brain for a long time, which prevents the opioid user from feeling the effects of natural or synthetic opioids. However, the opioid receptors are still being used when an opioid agonist attaches, which prevents the effects of opioid withdrawal and can help prevent relapse. The two most common opioid agonists are methadone and buprenorphine.

== Methadone ==
Methadone is an opioid agonist that binds to the same receptors in the brain as heroin and other opioids. Introduced as an analgesic in the US in 1947, methadone has been used in maintenance treatment—also known as substitution treatment, or drug replacement therapy—since 1964. Methadone treatments usually last for multiple years, although they can last for decades. A dose of methadone often minimizes the effects of withdrawal for approximately 24 hours and the lowest optimal dose is 60 mg. Methadone functions via competitive antagonism; while the prescribed agonist is in the opioid user's body, the use of illicit opioids (illicit heroin or fentanyl) will not produce the effects of illicit opioids. Methadone has a slower onset than illicit opioids and it produces less effects than illicit opioids. Side effects of methadone may include "constipation, weight gain, reduced libido, and irregular menses".(p. 467)

Methadone maintenance reduces the cravings for other opioids, and reduces the risk of fatal overdose from street drugs since the purity and strength of methadone is known, whereas substances obtained from the street vary significantly in strength and purity.

Therapeutic dosing is contingent upon individual patient needs, with a dosage range generally between 20 and 200 mg. Doses are unsafe for opioid-naive individuals, and administration of methadone is gradually increased to reach a therapeutic dose under medical supervision to reduce the risk of overdose. The amount of oral methadone a patient will require is dependent on the amount and power of opioids they consumed prior to initiating treatment, with an assessment in the mid-2000s (prior to the widespread introduction of fentanyl into street heroin supplies in the US) finding that 1 gram of street heroin is roughly equivalent to 50 to 80 mg of methadone. Methadone is taken either orally as a mixture of 1 mg/1ml supplied as a red or clear liquid, or as a mixture containing 10 mg of methadone in 1ml of liquid (green color) or 20 mg in 1ml of liquid (brown color). The latter is often used when a person is on a large amount of methadone, and is rarely permitted for unsupervised consumption. Since the formulations are not as viscous as the 1 mg/1ml mixture, they are more prone to misuse since they are easier to inject, and due to the high risk of overdose if diverted to an individual not accustomed to such a large dose. Methadone also comes in 40 mg dispersible tablets called "diskettes", as well as 5 and 10 mg pills that are round or "coffin" shaped. These pills are only given in hospital settings. Methadone can also be delivered by either IV or IM injection, as well as ampoules which come in various strengths ranging from 10 mg up to 50 mg. This method is often used for individuals who have a "needle fixation" and who would otherwise revert to using IV heroin.

With the emergence of other medications for the treatment of opioid addiction such as buprenorphine and long-acting naltrexone, MMT is no longer the dominant medically assisted addiction treatment.

Methadone maintenance has been termed "a first step toward social rehabilitation" because it increases the retention of patients in treatment, relieves them from the need to find, buy, and use multiple daily doses of street opioids, and offers a legal medical alternative. Methadone is one of the most researched treatments for opioid use disorder and has significant research support for its efficacy.

=== Dispensing ===
Methadone maintenance generally requires patients to visit the dispensing or dosing clinic daily, in accordance with state-controlled substance laws. Methadone, when administered at constant daily milligram doses, will stabilize patients so they feel a "high" from it and will not require additional street opioids. Most clinics will work with patients to get to a dosing level that will take away all cravings for other opiates without feeling too much of a "high" so they can function correctly throughout their day.

In the US, patients that attend methadone clinics regularly and abstain from the use of street opioids or other controlled substances can be permitted to take home doses known as privileges, though this is at the discretion of the clinic's medical staff. Depending on the state's law, some clinics will allow the use of drugs like cannabis and still permit take home doses. Some states allow methadone clinics to close on Sundays and provide take-home medication the day before. Clinics that offer take-home privileges will usually do so by slowly offering more take-home days over a period of time, as long as their standards of clean drug tests are met. In some states, these take-home privileges can work their way to people getting take-home doses that would last them 2–4 weeks maximum. Another way take-homes are permitted is if the clinic puts the patient on a split dose schedule where they take part of their dose in the morning and take home a dose to take later in the day. This is usually given out to people on higher doses, or to help lengthen effectiveness throughout the day. States may mandate drug testing in clinic drug abuse groups and/or outside Narcotics Anonymous meetings. In other countries, dispensing of methadone maintenance by pharmacies, or via prescription from general practitioners rather than specialized clinics, is permitted.

=== Travel ===
In the UK, patients on methadone maintenance who wish to travel overseas are subject to certain legal requirements surrounding the exportation and importation of methadone. The prescriber must be provided with details of travel, after which they will arrange for a Home Office Export License to be provided. This license is only required if the total amount being exported exceeds 500 mg. Granting of the license does not allow for the importation of methadone into any overseas jurisdiction. For importation, the patient should contact the embassy of their destination country and request permission to import methadone onto their shores, although not all countries allow the importation of controlled drugs. The license also allows for the re-importation of any remaining methadone back into the UK. It is normal for patients traveling overseas to be prescribed methadone in a tablet form, as tablets are easier to transport. For patients who expect to be overseas for a prolonged period of time, "courtesy" arrangements can be made at a local clinic which arrange for the prescription of the necessary medication. If traveling throughout the United States, state or city clinics may offer "take home" doses for the period of time patients will be gone. Depending on length of travel or clinic rules, they may opt to have their "courtesy" dose at another clinic that is closer to where they are travelling.

== Buprenorphine ==
Buprenorphine was approved by the US Food and Drug Administration (FDA) in 2002. The lowest optimal dose of buprenorphine is 8 mg. Buprenorphine has fewer withdrawal symptoms upon discontinuation, lower risk for overdose, and lower potential for abuse; therefore, it is more effective for unsupervised treatment than methadone. Opioid users can take fewer doses per week than methadone. Side effects of buprenorphine may include constipation and disordered sleep.

== Comparison with related therapies ==
The manufacturers of naltrexone have marketed it as superior because it is not an opioid. This argument has moved criminal justice officials to prefer the medicine, and has triggered a Congressional investigation about mismarketing. No study has found naltrexone to be superior to methadone or buprenorphine, and a real-world review of patient records suggests that methadone and buprenorphine are superior at reducing overdose risk or the need for acute drug dependence treatment.

== Opioid withdrawal ==
When the body goes through withdrawal, the opioid receptors in the brain are not filled with an adequate amount of opioids, which means that the feelings of euphoria associated with opioids are not felt. Withdrawal only happens when the body has become accustomed to having opioids in the receptors, which changes the structure and functioning of the brain. Thus, without opioids, the brain functions differently in comparison to the brain before the user started becoming dependent on opioids. People who have a dependence on opioids are the only people who experience withdrawal symptoms.

Opioids are commonly prescribed to alleviate symptoms of chronic pain. However, misuse of this pain-killer impacts millions of people worldwide each year. According to WHO, approximately 115,000 people died of opioid overdose in 2017. Addiction is widespread among users and can typically be seen through symptoms such as intense cravings, rejection of previously enjoyed activities, and struggling to fulfill responsibilities due to opioid use. OAT is one suggested treatment for opioid misuse because it is commonly reported to minimize the likelihood of experiencing psychological and physiological symptoms associated with withdrawal (i.e., diarrhea, body pain, vomiting, profound insomnia, sweating, anxiety and depression) and alleviate the intensity of most withdrawal symptoms.

== Psychological understanding ==
There are numerous psychological variables that hold the capacity to influence the effectiveness of opioid agonist therapy (OAT), as explained in Daniel Michael Doleys's 2017 narrative review. Four of these variables include likelihood of opioid withdrawal, conditioning and learning factors, patient-specific factors, and social variables.

=== Conditioning and learning ===
A second psychological factor that can influence the effectiveness of OAT is conditioning and learning. The activity and functioning of opioids are influenced by numerous principles of conditioning and learning such as environmental cues and associations.

=== Patient-specific factors and social variables ===
Patient-specific factors such as mood, and overall psychological and neurocognitive status also hold the capacity to influence the effectiveness of OAT. Certain patient characteristics, such as distress intolerance, can result in increased opioid misuse to obtain relief from one's chronic pain. The social environment that the opioid user lives and uses in can also alter the effectiveness of the treatment. A stable positive psychosocial environment aids in the effectiveness of OAT, whereas a negative psychosocial environment can make the effects of OAT difficult for the opioid user. OAT is most effective if the opioid user is compliant and the treatment is consistent. Counseling opportunities are also very helpful with regard to OAT's rehabilitation efforts.

== Barriers to access ==
=== Stigma ===
Addiction is highly stigmatized, even in the medical field. Being stigmatized correlates to a decline in an individual's physical and mental health. Thus, stigmatization is a prohibitive factor for addicts who may attempt to seek treatment. Even though opioid agonist therapy (OAT) has been proven to be an effective treatment for opioid use disorder, very few American doctors have undertaken the necessary education and certification to provide the treatment. Most treatment facilities, such as rehabilitation or sobering centers, do not offer OAT, nor do they accept patients who are already receiving opioid agonist therapy. Many court-mandated drug treatment programs prohibit or strongly discourage use of opioid agonist therapies among their participants.

Due to risks associated with intravenous drug use, such as infections and blood borne illnesses, access to post-acute care is critical. While patients who do not use intravenous drugs may receive post-acute care at home, "healthcare facilities and infusion companies may not allow people with a history of [injection drug use] to have home intravenous antibiotic therapy because of concern that an indwelling intravenous catheter could be used to inject illicit drugs".(p. 17) Moreover, American post-acute care programs rarely accept patients who are receiving OAT.

In the United States, protection from discrimination under the Americans with Disabilities Act (ADA) are more vague for addicts than they are for those living with other disabilities. Active drug users are not protected by the ADA. Only individuals who are in recovery and not actively using drugs qualify for protection. However, individuals receiving OAT are considered to have a disability and are subsequently protected by American law.

Advocates identify the bureaucratic red tape surrounding the prescription and administration of opioid agonists as potential obstructions to fair accessible medical care. Potential solutions include federal incentives or requirement for doctors to be trained to prescribe agonists. Another solution is the amendment of the 2000 Drug Abuse Act, which would remove the requirement of special certification altogether.

Rahul Gupta, director of the White House Office of National Drug Control Policy, identified stigma among doctors as a barrier for patients with OUD.

Similarly, in Canada, research has shown that access to OAT remains low. Despite increasing rates of opioid overdoses, only 1 in 18 people were offered a prescription for OAT within one week of discharge from the emergency department or hospital after an opioid overdose. Older people, people with mental illness, and people living in lower socioeconomic areas were less likely to be started on OAT after an overdose. Despite the benefits of OAT in reducing morbidity and mortality, OAT initiation rates remain low.

=== Overdose ===
Higher doses of methadone may cause respiratory depression and/or euphoria in some patients.

== Controversy ==
Methadone maintenance is also known as drug replacement therapy or opiate replacement therapy (ORT), and has been the subject of much controversy since its inception. Opponents note that methadone prescription replaces dependence on one opioid with another, that methadone maintenance does not prevent additional use of heroin or other opioids in addition to methadone, and that the stabilization or "blocking" effect on euphoria can be overridden with the use of other opioids or with benzodiazepines.

In England and Wales, criminal justice drugs workers employed by the 'Drug Interventions Programme' are based in most arrest suites nationwide. Heroin and crack cocaine users are identified either by mandatory urine tests, or by cell sweeps and face-to-face discussions with arrestees. Identified drug use will often trigger a referral to local drug services, whose first-line response to heroin dependence is likely to involve substitute (buprenorphine or methadone) prescribing.

This line of work originated in the mid to late 1990s, as large-scale studies identified significant levels of heroin and crack cocaine use in populations of arrestees. In a large-scale study of drug misuse in arrested populations, 466 'drug misusing repeat offenders' were identified. Of these, 80% declared an 'unmet need for treatment'.

Contemporaneously, the National Treatment Outcomes Research Study (NTORS) found high levels of money-related offenses in populations of people seeking community treatment for drug problems. In a NTORS report, researches found that every £1 spent on drug treatment could yield between £9.50 and £18 of savings in social costs, mostly attributable to reductions in treatment seekers' levels of offenses.

These studies, along with others, were taken on by Tony Blair whilst still Shadow Home Secretary, as Conservative policy regarding drug misuse was relatively undeveloped. Blair disseminated a press release in 1994 entitled 'Drugs: the Need for Action', claiming that drug misuse caused £20bn of money-related crimes each year. This report was dismissed by the Conservative Secretary of State for the Home Department as 'four pages of hot waffle against the Government, with three miserable paragraphs at the end'.

After winning the UK general election of 1997, Blair's first cross-governmental drug strategy established the nationwide development of an integrated drugs and crime strategy as a priority. Drugs workers were in police custody suites nationwide, and saw 50,000 people in 2001. The work of these teams was then formalised in 2003, given an expanded remit (working with prisoners following release, for example), and rebadged the Drug Interventions Programme (DIP).

The founding strapline for DIP was 'out of crime, into treatment', reflecting the crime-reduction philosophy behind criminal justice drug treatment and ongoing methadone (or buprenorphine) maintenance at that time. In their 2010 Drug Strategy, the Conservative/Liberal Democrat coalition stated their continued intention to support DIP.

== See also ==
- Harm reduction
- Stimulant maintenance
