= Buprenorphine/naloxone =

Opioid treatment

- Buprenorphine, an opioid

- Naloxone, an opioid antagonist

Combination of
- Buprenorphine: Opioid modulator
- Naloxone: Opioid antagonist

Clinical data
- Trade names: Suboxone, others
- AHFS/Drugs.com: Monograph
- License data: US DailyMed: Buprenorphine and naloxone
- Pregnancy category: AU: C
- Routes of administration: Sublingual, buccal
- ATC code: N07BC51 (WHO)

Legal status
- Legal status: AU: S8 (Controlled drug); CA: ℞-only; UK: POM (Prescription only); US: Schedule III; EU: Rx-only

Identifiers
- CAS Number: 352020-56-5
- PubChem CID: 11274356
- KEGG: D10250
- CompTox Dashboard (EPA): DTXSID50188706

Buprenorphine/naloxone, sold under the brand name Suboxone among others, is a fixed-dose combination medication that includes buprenorphine and naloxone. It is used to treat opioid use disorder, and reduces the mortality of opioid use disorder by 50% (by reducing the risk of overdose on full-agonist opioids such as heroin or fentanyl). It relieves cravings to use and withdrawal symptoms. Buprenorphine/naloxone is available for use in two different forms, under the tongue or in the cheek.

Side effects may include respiratory depression (decreased breathing), small pupils, sleepiness, and low blood pressure. The risk of overdose with buprenorphine/naloxone (unless combined with other sedating substances) is exceedingly low, and lower than with methadone, but people are more likely to stop treatment on buprenorphine/naloxone than methadone. Buprenorphine (like methadone) is a treatment option during pregnancy.

At lower doses, buprenorphine results in the usual opioid effects; high doses beyond a certain level do not result in greater effects. This is believed to result in a lower risk of overdose than some other opioids. Naloxone is an opioid antagonist that competes with and blocks the effect of other opioids (including buprenorphine) if given by injection. Naloxone is poorly absorbed when taken by mouth and is added to decrease the risk that people will misuse the medication by dissolving the medication and injecting it. Misuse by injection or use in the nose still occurs, and more recently the efficacy of naloxone in preventing misuse by injection has been brought into question and preparations including naloxone could even be less safe than preparations containing solely buprenorphine. Rates of misuse in the U.S. appear to be lower than with other opioids.

The combination formulation was approved for medical use in the US in 2002, and in the European Union in 2017. A generic version was approved in the US in 2018. In 2019, it was the 272nd most commonly prescribed medication in the US, with more than 1 million prescriptions.

== Medical uses ==
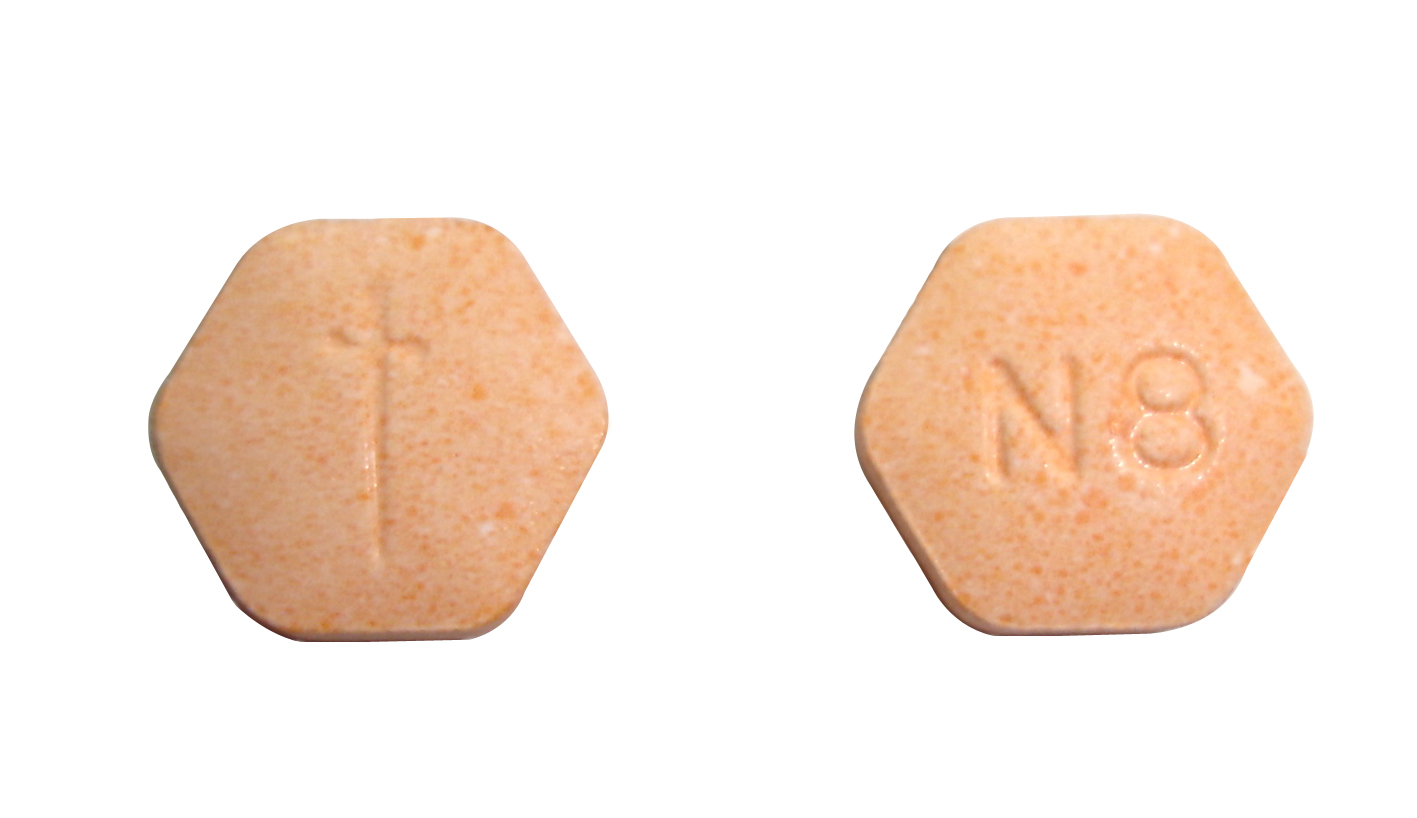
Sublingual tablets

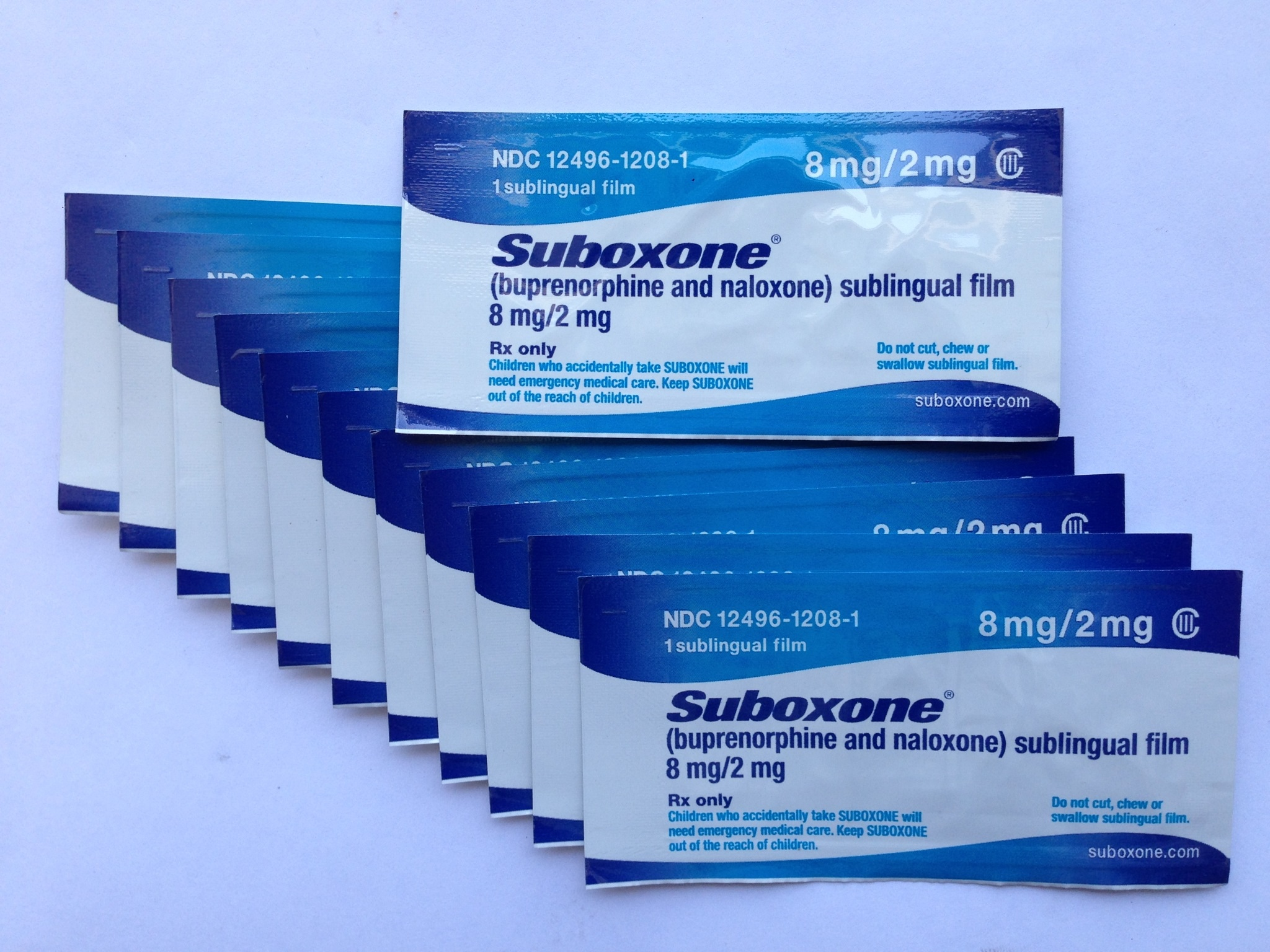
Film (package)

Buprenorphine/naloxone is used for the treatment of opioid use disorder. Long-term outcomes are generally better with use of buprenorphine/naloxone than attempts at stopping opioid use altogether. This includes a lower risk of overdose with medication use. Due to the high binding affinity and low activation at the opioid receptor, cravings and withdrawal for opioids are decreased while preventing a person from getting high and relapsing on another opioid. The combination of the two medications is preferred over buprenorphine alone for maintenance treatment due to the presence of naloxone in the formulation, which is believed to help discourage intravenous use. However, the belief that the addition of naloxone provides this benefit has been called into question, and posters on drug-related online forums have stated that they were able to attain a high by injecting preparations of buprenorphine despite being combined with naloxone.

Buprenorphine/naloxone is effective for treating opioid dependence and serves as a recommended first-line medication according to the U.S. National Institute on Drug Abuse. The medication is an effective maintenance therapy for opioid dependence and has generally similar efficacy to methadone. Both treatments — buprenorphine/naloxone and methadone — are substantially more effective than abstinence-based treatment. As of October 2023 prescribers no longer need a Drug Addiction Treatment Act (DATA 2000) waiver to prescribe buprenorphine/naloxone for opioid dependence. All practitioners who have a current DEA registration that includes Schedule III authority, may now prescribe buprenorphine for opioid use disorder in their practice if permitted by applicable state law. The Substance Abuse and Mental Health Services Administration encourages practitioners to treat patients within their practices who require treatment for a substance use disorder. Because it may now be prescribed much more readily out of an office setting (as opposed to methadone, which requires specialized centers), buprenorphine/naloxone allows people more access to this medication and more freedom of administration. It also thus comes with more risks in this vulnerable population. Buprenorphine/naloxone may be recommended for socially stable people who use opioids who cannot retrieve medications from a center daily, who have another condition requiring regular primary care visits, or who have jobs or daily lives that require they maintain all their faculties and cannot take a sedating medication. Buprenorphine/naloxone is also recommended over methadone for people at high risk of methadone toxicity, such as the elderly, those taking high doses of benzodiazepines or other sedating substances, concomitant alcohol use disorder, those with a lower level of opioid tolerance, and those at high risk of prolonged QT interval. It is also helpful to use the medication in combination with psychosocial support and counseling.

=== Available forms ===
Buprenorphine/naloxone is available in sublingual formulations (that is, products that are dissolved under the tongue). It is also available through monthly injection by healthcare provider. There is no evidence that the tablet formulation is easier to divert and use in ways other than intended by the prescriber compared to the film formulation, or that the tablet formulation has a higher risk for accidental ingestion by children. There are various pharmacokinetic differences between sublingual formulations.

== Contraindications ==
Contraindications are severe respiratory or liver impairment and acute alcoholism. There are limited accounts of cross-reactivity with opioids, but there is a possibility. Serious central nervous system (CNS) and respiratory depression may also occur with concurrent use of CNS depressants, ingesting alcohol, or other CNS-depressing factors while on buprenorphine/naloxone.

== Adverse effects ==
Side effects are similar to those of buprenorphine and other opioids. In addition, naloxone can induce withdrawal symptoms in people who are chemically dependent on opioids. The most common side effects (in order of most to least common) of sublingual tablets include headaches, opioid withdrawal syndrome, pain, nausea, increased sweating, and difficulty sleeping. The most common side effects seen in film formulations are tongue pain, decreased sensation and redness in the mouth, headache, nausea, vomiting, excessive sweating, constipation, signs and symptoms of opioid withdrawal, sleeping difficulties, pain, and swelling of the extremities. Post-approval, the most frequently reported side effects of buprenorphine/naloxone in sublingual strip form (i.e. Suboxone strips) are peripheral edema, stomatitis, glossitis, blistering of the mouth, and mouth ulcers (mouth sores). Use of buprenorphine/naloxone may also increase the risk of developing certain dental problems (including tooth decay and tooth loss).

Buprenorphine/naloxone has a milder side effect profile than methadone and limited respiratory effects, due to both agonist/antagonist effects. But buprenorphine/naloxone may be less safe than methadone in people with stable liver disease since it can elevate liver enzymes.

=== Dependence and withdrawal ===
When taken in excess, buprenorphine/naloxone can produce dysphoric symptoms for non-opioid-dependent/tolerant people because buprenorphine is a partial opioid agonist. The sublingual formulation of the buprenorphine/naloxone combination was designed to reduce the potential to inject the medication in comparison to buprenorphine alone. If the combination is taken sublingually, as directed, the addition of naloxone does not diminish buprenorphine's effects. When an opioid-dependent person dissolves and injects a combination sublingual tablet, it is believed that a withdrawal effect may be triggered because of naloxone's high parenteral bioavailability. However, the efficacy of naloxone in preventing misuse by injection has more recently been brought into question and preparations including naloxone could even be less safe than preparations containing solely buprenorphine. While this mechanism may act to deter intravenous injection, the Suboxone formulation can still produce an opioid agonist "high" if used sublingually by non-dependent persons, leading to opioid dependence.

== Interactions ==
Buprenorphine's sedating/narcotic effect is increased by other sedating substances, such as other opioids, benzodiazepines, first-generation antihistamines, alcohol, and antipsychotics. Opioids and especially benzodiazepines also increase the risk of potentially lethal respiratory depression.

Strong inhibitors of the liver enzyme CYP3A4, such as ketoconazole, moderately increase buprenorphine concentrations; CYP3A4 inducers can theoretically decrease concentrations of buprenorphine.

== Pharmacology ==
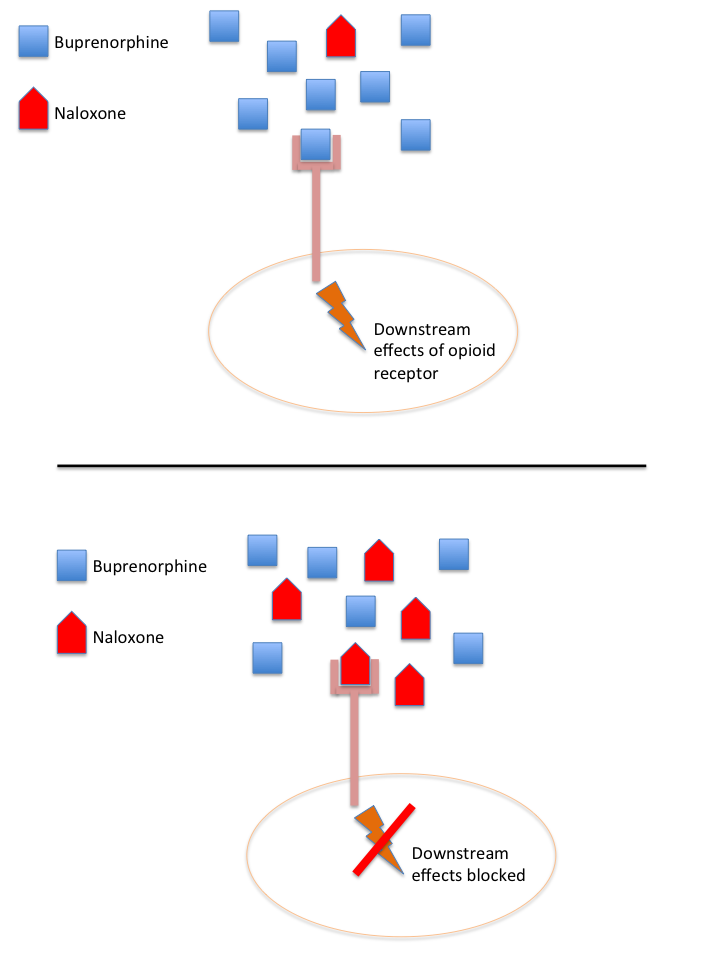
A theoretical model of activity: buprenorphine/naloxone at opioid receptor when taken sublingually (top) versus when injected intravenously (bottom).

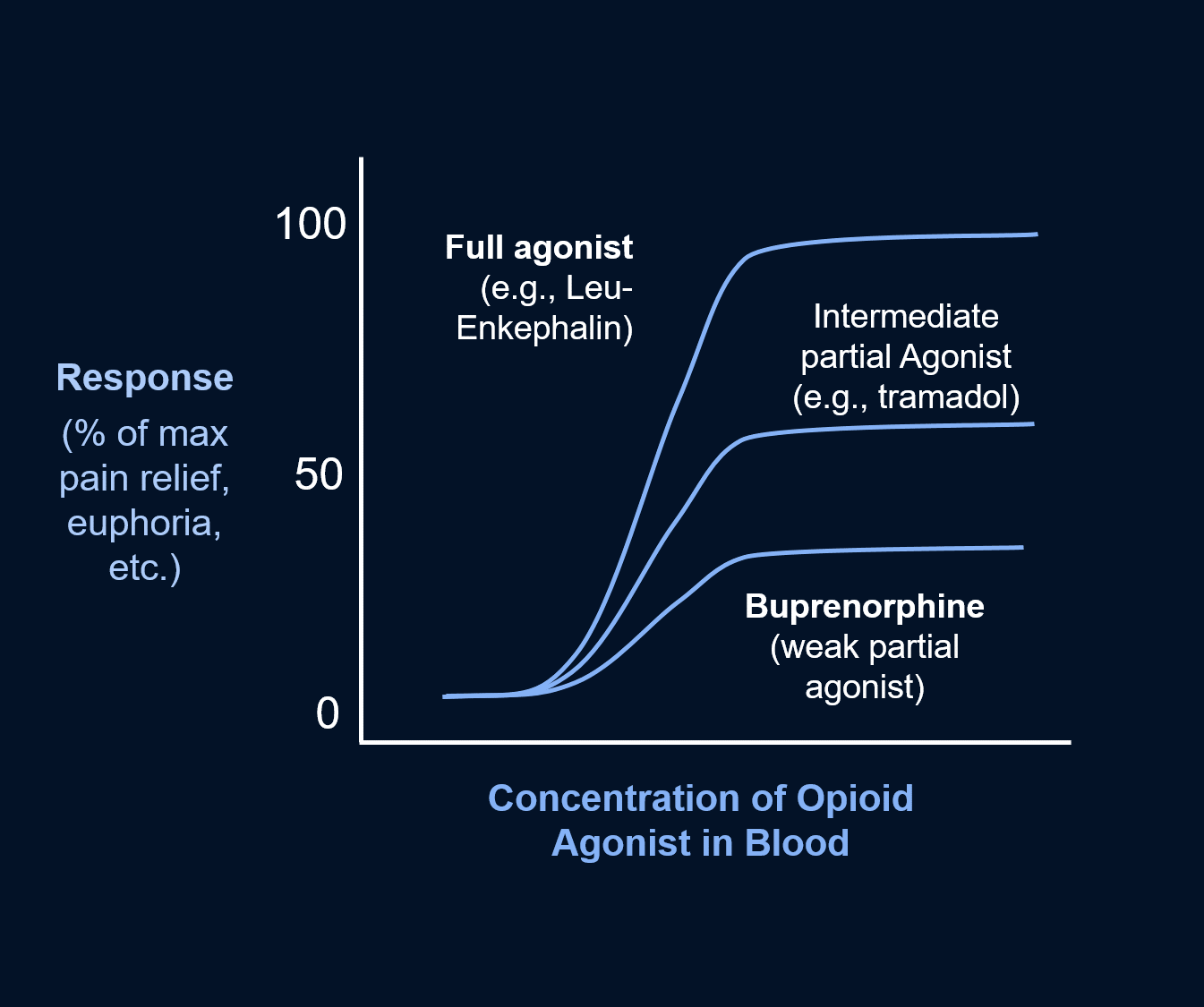
Buprenorphine as a partial agonist: Buprenorphine cannot fully activate the μ-opioid receptor even when the dose is escalated. This is demonstrated as a plateau in the concentration-response curve. Opioids like morphine (natural) or leu-enkephalin (endogenous in the body) produce a greater maximum response. Tramadol is a partial agonist with intermediate activity between buprenorphine and full agonists. A full description of buprenorphine with naloxone pharmacology can be found at https://www.youtube.com/watch?v=_y8DGjkP1so

=== Mechanism of action ===
Buprenorphine binds strongly to opioid receptors and acts as a pain-reducing medication in the central nervous system (CNS). It binds to the μ-opioid receptor with high affinity, which produces analgesic effects in the CNS. It is a partial μ-opioid receptor agonist and a weak κ-opioid receptor antagonist. As a partial agonist, buprenorphine binds and activates the opioid receptors, but has only partial efficacy at the receptor relative to a full agonist, even at maximal receptor occupancy. It is thus well-suited to treat opioid dependence, as it produces milder effects on the opioid receptor with lower dependence and habit-forming potential.

Naloxone is a pure opioid antagonist that competes with opioid molecules in the CNS and prevents them from binding to the opioid receptors. Naloxone's binding affinity is highest for the μ-opioid receptor, then the δ-opioid receptor, and lowest for the κ-opioid receptor. Naloxone has poor bioavailability, and is rapidly inactivated following oral administration. When injected, it exerts its full effects.

The principle behind its function as a deterrent is as follows: when taken sublingually as prescribed, buprenorphine's effects at the opioid receptor dominate, while naloxone's effects are negligible due to the low oral absorption. But when someone attempts to misuse the medication via either injection or inhalation, the naloxone is intended to act as an antagonist and either reduce the opioid's euphoric effects or even precipitate withdrawal in those dependent on opioids. This helps reduce the potential for deviating from the prescriber's intended use relative to buprenorphine, though it does not eradicate it. One reason that naloxone might have limited efficacy as an abuse-deterrent is that buprenorphine binds more tightly to the mu-opioid receptor than naloxone.

=== Pharmacokinetics ===
There are small differences in the pharmacokinetics between different sublingual buprenorphine/naloxone products. These differences may require changes in dose when a person switches from one product to another. The buprenorphine/naloxone sublingual film (e.g. trade name Suboxone) achieves higher buprenorphine maximum plasma concentrations (C_{max}) and area under the curve (AUC, a measure of total drug exposure) than the original buprenorphine/naloxone sublingual tablets at equal doses. For example, at a buprenorphine/naloxone dose of 8 mg/2 mg, the buprenorphine C_{max} after a single dose of the original tablet formulation is around 3 ng/mL whereas that of the 8 mg/2 mg film formulation is around 3.55 ng/mL. The Zubsolv trade name sublingual tablets have higher buprenorphine bioavailability than the original sublingual tablets, while the Bunavail trade name buccal films have the highest bioavailability. For example, a single dose of Bunavail 4.2 mg/0.7 mg achieves a C_{max} around 3.41 ng/mL.

==== Buprenorphine ====
Buprenorphine is metabolized by the liver, primarily via the cytochrome P450 (CYP) isozyme CYP3A4, into norbuprenorphine. The glucuronidation of buprenorphine is primarily carried out by the UDP-glucuronosyltransferases (UGTs) UGT1A1 and UGT2B7, while norbuprenorphine is glucuronidated by UGT1A1 and UGT1A3. These glucuronides are then eliminated mainly through excretion into bile. The elimination half-life of buprenorphine is 20 to 73 hours (mean 37 hours). Due to the mainly hepatic elimination, there is no risk of accumulation in people with kidney problems.

==== Naloxone ====
Naloxone is extensively inactivated by first-pass metabolism in the liver, meaning that the use of buprenorphine/naloxone as prescribed should not lead to active naloxone in the blood (which, as an opioid antagonist, would reverse the effect of buprenorphine or other opioids).

== Society and culture ==
=== Cost ===
While the cost of the medication buprenorphine/naloxone is greater than buprenorphine alone, one analysis predicted the overall costs would be less in the United States due to a lower risk of misuse.

=== Access in the United States ===
Before the Drug Addiction Treatment Act of 2000 (DATA), physicians were not allowed to prescribe narcotics to treat opioid dependence. People with narcotic dependence had to go to registered clinics to receive treatment. With DATA, Suboxone was the first medication approved for office-based treatment for opioid dependence. Suboxone has thus become widely used as a replacement for methadone as it can be prescribed by doctors in their offices, while methadone can only be provided at specialized addiction centers, of which there are a limited number, often making access difficult. Integrating Medication-Assisted Treatment into outpatient primary care practices improves patient access to Suboxone. Some physicians are also leading a movement to begin prescribing it out of the emergency department (ED), as some small studies have shown ED-initiated Suboxone to be effective with people more likely to remain in addiction treatment compared to those either referred to addiction treatment programs or those receiving just a brief intervention in the department.

Access to Suboxone can be limited due to varying prior authorization requirements across different insurers. Prior authorization is used by insurance companies to limit certain medications' use by requiring approval before the insurance company will pay for them. This can influence a person's financial access and adherence. Financial access is determined through prior authorization approval, which the prescriber must request before the person can start the medication. The time it takes to have the request approved can delay the person starting the medication. The prior authorization process can also affect adherence because approval is needed for every prescription. This presents the potential for a gap in treatment and withdrawal symptoms as the person waits for approval. Several insurance companies, as well as Medicaid in various states, have removed the use of prior authorization for Suboxone in an attempt to increase access to this treatment.

=== Controversies ===
In July 2019, the British company Reckitt Benckiser Group (RB Group) and its current/former affiliated entities (notably Indivior, which split from RB Group in 2014) settled with the US Department of Justice (DOJ) regarding the sale and marketing of brand name Suboxone (buprenorphine/naloxone). The non-prosecution agreement involves RB Group paying up to $1.4 billion, the largest settlement payment in U.S. history involving an opioid-class medication. This record was surpassed in October 2020, when Purdue Pharma reached an $8 billion settlement for claims related to injuries and deaths caused by the opioid epidemic, which includes criminal fines, forfeiture, and civil damages. The 2019 case alleged anti-competitive behavior by RB Group and Indivior surrounding the expiration of their regulatory exclusivity for Suboxone sublingual tablets. The DOJ alleged that RB Group and Indivior employed a product hopping scheme (when a firm ceases production of a product upon expiration of regulatory exclusivity in favor of another product that still has regulatory exclusivity in order to prevent generic manufacturer competition) by misrepresenting that the Suboxone sublingual film formulation was safer than the sublingual tablet formulation because "children are less likely to be accidentally exposed to the film product". There was no scientific evidence for that claim. The company also sponsored a complaint to the FDA, expressing concern that buprenorphine/naloxone sublingual tablets (the very product they formerly produced) were unsafe, requesting that applications for regulatory approval of generic products by other pharmaceutical companies (their competitors) be rejected by the US Food and Drug Administration.
