= Neonatal withdrawal =

Infant drug withdrawal symptom

Neonatal withdrawal, neonatal abstinence syndrome (NAS) or neonatal opioid withdrawal syndrome (NOWS) is a drug withdrawal syndrome of infants, caused by the cessation of the administration of drugs which may or may not be licit. Tolerance, dependence, and withdrawal may occur as a result of repeated administration of drugs, or after short-term high-dose use—for example, during mechanical ventilation in intensive care units.

There are two types of NAS: prenatal and postnatal. Prenatal NAS is caused by discontinuation of drugs taken by the pregnant parent, while postnatal NAS is caused by discontinuation of drugs directly to the infant.

== Signs and symptoms ==
Those diagnosed with NAS may exhibit signs and symptoms that vary depending on the type of drugs used by the parent, how long the drugs were used, the amount of drug used that made it to the child, and symptoms associated with premature birth. Symptoms can appear as soon as 24 to 48 hours and as late as 5 to 10 days after birth. If the neonate (a newborn less than 4 weeks of age) is expected to have NAS, they may need to stay in the hospital to be monitored for a week. A baby born at full-term may commonly exhibit symptoms such as mottling (net-like bluish-red skin due to swollen blood vessels), irritability, trembling, excessive or high-pitched crying, sleeping problems, increased muscle tone, overactive reflexes, seizures, yawning, stuffy nose, sneezing, poor feeding, rapid breathing, slow weight gain, vomiting, diarrhea, sweating, fever or unstable temperature. These symptoms mainly arise from the dysregulation of four physiological and or behavioral systems: state control and attention which influence irritability and avoidance of eye contact; motor and tone control which influence tremors and seizures, sensory processing which influences hypersensitivity or hyposensitivity, and autonomic control which influence patterns of respiration and fever. Each of these can influence the dysregulation of another system. For example, hypersensitivity in the sensory processing system can cause poor feeding due to the inability to relax, which therefore ultimately results in weight loss or poor weight gain.

Signs and symptoms are also grouped into three systems by the Finnegan Neonatal Abstinence Scoring System (FNASS):

1. Central nervous system. Includes deficiencies in sleep after eating and myoclonic (uncontrolled movement) jerk.
2. Metabolic, vasomotor, and respiratory. Includes symptoms like a stuffy nose and tachypnea.
3. Gastrointestinal. Includes excessive sucking and poor feeding.

Babies born prematurely (before 37 weeks) often exhibit less symptoms or in less severity than those born at full term (38 to 42 weeks). This is due to being exposed to the drug for a lesser period of time during pregnancy. Premature babies with NAS tend to recover at a much faster rate than a full term baby would.

Both neonatal and maternal factors such as gestational age (length of pregnancy starting from the first day of the last menstrual period), maternal substance use, genetics, and gender play a role in the symptoms expressed by the neonate. Every infant is unique in which symptoms are expressed. Males are prone to having more severe symptoms compared to females and those with hypermethylation at the OPRM1 and COMT gene sites experience more severe symptoms as well. Symptoms can also appear and disappear and fluctuate in severity over time within the same infant and withdrawal period. Untreated NAS symptoms can cause developmental issues such as altered cognitive, social, emotional, and behavioral capacities that appear later in life. Long term effects vary by the substance that the neonate gets exposed to but they most commonly have been shown to affect growth, behavior, cognitive function, vision problems, motor problems, language, academic achievement, otitis media (infection or inflammation of the middle ear), and predisposition to self utilization of drugs. Alcohol exposure could lead to poor growth. Tobacco exposure can increase the risk of obesity. Alcohol, nicotine, and opiate exposure have shown to lead to attention deficits. Nicotine and alcohol exposure affect learning and memory. Cocaine exposure affects visual and motor skills, attention, and memory. Cannabis has been shown to have adverse effects on deep problem solving skills and visual memory. Nicotine exposure has led to poor reading abilities. Alcohol and cocaine led to a decreased use of language. Opioid exposure has led to visual impairments such as reduced ability to see fine detail and uncontrolled eye movements. Heroin exposure led to lower weight, height, and head circumference as well as decreased cognitive function that resulted in lower perceptual, quantitative, and memory areas of cognition. Some common drugs that could result in NAS withdrawal or withdrawal-like symptoms in neonates are:

- Opioids; agonists such as morphine, codeine, methadone, meperidine, oxycodone, propoxyphene, hydromorphone, hydrocodone, fentanyl, tramadol, and heroin, antagonists such as naloxone, and naltrexone, and mixed agonist-antagonists like pentazocine and buprenorphine;
- CNS stimulants; amphetamines such as dextroamphetamine, methamphetamine, amphetamine sulfate, amphetamine congeners, benzphetamine, diethylpropion, fenfluramine, phendimetrazine, phentermine, cocaine, methylphenidate, pemoline, phencyclidines, and nicotine;
- CNS depressants; alcohol, barbiturates, benzodiazepines, other sedative hypnotics, methaqualone, glutethimide, chloral, hydrate, cannabinoids, cannabis, and hashish;
- Hallucinogens; indolealkylamines, phenylethylamines, phenylisopropylamine, inhalants, solvents and aerosols, nitrites, and nitrous oxide.

=== Cannabis ===
There are pre- and post-natal exposure risks of neurobehavioral disorders. Exposure during pregnancy can cause low birth weight, reduced head circumference, cognitive deficits, emotional dysregulation, high impulsiveness, and higher risk to develop a substance disorder. The effects can continue into early adulthood.

=== Cocaine ===
Newborn infants with cocaine exposure manifest abnormal neurobehavioral changes. These are typically found between 48 hours and 72 hours of life. Cocaine is a vasoconstrictor, which is the main mechanism that causes harm to the fetus and placenta. As the drug is capable of crossing the blood–brain barrier and placenta, they will experience shortcomings. In a 2005 randomized case-controlled prospective study, cocaine-exposed infants displayed jitteriness, tremors, irritability, excessive sucking, extreme alertness, abnormal breathing and autonomic instability. Based on how much of the drug the infant was exposed to, there is a positive dose-response relationship between exposure of cocaine and hyperactivity.

=== Alcohol ===
Alcohol, a central nervous system depressant, is one of the most commonly used drugs. With long-term exposure of alcohol to newborn infant, there are withdrawal symptoms. These are characterized by tremors, hypertonia, restlessness, excessive mouthing movements, inconsolable crying and reflex abnormalities. There are direct effects known as fetal alcohol spectrum disorder.

=== Nicotine ===
Nicotine-exposed infants may showcase more NAS signs. However, it is not certain if the effects is due to it being a transient drug effect or a true withdrawal. There can be an increase in tone and alertness with poor self-regulation.

== Causes ==
The drugs involved can include opioids, selective serotonin reuptake inhibitors (SSRIs), serotonin and norepinephrine reuptake inhibitors (SNRIs), tricyclic antidepressants (TCAs) ethanol, benzodiazepines, anticonvulsants, and muscle relaxants. Opioids have become the most associated with NAS due to the growing opioid crisis leading to increased opioid use during pregnancy. Although NAS generally includes opioid and nonopioid exposures, studies have shown that such cases have primarily resulted from in utero opioid exposure, thus resulting in the use of neonatal opioid withdrawal syndrome (NOWS) as a subset of NAS. Neonatal abstinence syndrome does not happen in prenatal cocaine exposure (with babies exposed to cocaine in utero) in the sense that such symptoms are difficult to separate in the context of other factors such as prematurity or prenatal exposure to other drugs.

Although the main pathophysiology of NAS is still not fully understood, there are several potential mechanisms and pathways that are being investigated that may be related to the development of NAS caused by abnormal levels of neurotransmitters and inadequate expression of opioid receptors. Due to the differing substances that can lead to NAS, each substance can result in a different cause leading to the symptoms of NAS. Examples of such differences include: opioid withdrawal resulting in decreases in serotonin and dopamine with an increase in corticotrophin, norepinephrine, and acetylcholine; TCA withdrawal resulting in a cholinergic rebound phenomenon; and methamphetamine withdrawal resulting in a decrease in dopamine, serotonin, and other monoamines.

=== Risk factors ===
Several studies have shown that multiple risk factors, ranging from social aspects to genetics, can contribute to the severity of NAS and the recovery process. Mutations in the genes for opioid receptor expression (mu-opioid receptors OPRM1, delta-OPRD1, and kappa-OPRK1 genes) and the dopamine metabolism pathway (COMT gene) have been associated with quicker recovery resulting in shorter duration of treatment. Environmental influences that can affect expression of the aforementioned genes, like DNA methylation that results in decreased OPRM1 gene expression, have also been associated with increased severity of NAS. Some non-genetic risk factors include smoking and methadone use during pregnancy that can result in increased severity of NAS.

== Diagnosis ==
According to the 2020 guidelines from the American Academy of Pediatrics (referred to as the AAP 2020 Guidelines), diagnosis of NAS is determined through clinical assessment, neonatal testing, as well as diagnosis by exclusion to make sure that there are no other potential causes for the neonatal symptoms. In addition to assessing the newborn, clinicians must also conduct a full evaluation of the social and medical history of the mother.

Clinical assessment as described by the AAP 2020 Guidelines mainly consists of performing a standardized assessment to measure both the presence and severity of withdrawal symptoms being presented by the neonate at risk of NAS. The main scoring system associated with this standardized assessment is the modified Finnegan score, also known as the Modified Finnegan Neonatal Abstinence Score. The scoring system assesses the neonate and observes the severity of the following characteristics: crying; sleeping; moro reflex; tremor; increased muscle tone; excoriations of chin, knees, elbows, toes, and nose; myoclonic jerks; generalized convulsions; sweating; hypothermia; and many others. This same assessment can be used in assessing the response that the neonate is having to the chosen treatment.

According to the AAP 2020 Guidelines, neonatal testing refers to laboratory testing of the infant's urine, meconium, and umbilical cord tissue. Although these tests are recommended per guidelines, there are several considerations to understand when performing these tests. With urine toxicology tests, samples must be collected immediately after birth since these tests only capture a short window of substance exposure due to the rapid metabolism and elimination of most drugs of concern. Although meconium and umbilical cord tissue testing provides a larger window of observation for substance exposure, it is not recommended if the mother is already receiving treatment for opioid use disorder (OUD) with frequent toxicology testing since this will not provide any additional information.

== Management ==
Objectives of management are to minimize negative outcomes and promote normal development. Supportive care is the first step in management, but this is typically not enough and is complemented with medication. As of 2023, there have been three main guidelines that provide recommendations in regard to the treatment and prevention of NAS: 2023 guidelines from the Society of Obstetricians and Gynaecologists of Canada (referred to as the SOGC 2023 Guidelines), 2020 guidelines from the American Academy of Pediatrics (referred to as the AAP 2020 Guidelines), and the 2017 guidelines from the American College of Obstetricians and Gynecologists (referred to as the ACOG 2017 Guidelines).

=== Setting of care ===
According to the SOGC 2023 Guidelines, it is recommended that if a pregnant woman has been diagnosed with substance use disorder, then delivery of the infant must be done in a center that is equipped for monitoring of the infant for NAS. Traditionally, if an infant has been diagnosed with NAS after proper monitoring, then management of the disease is often handled in the neonatal intensive care unit (NICU). As per the AAP 2020 Guidelines, it is no longer recommended to admit infants to the NICU if they only have NAS since this can cause more problems that can aggravate symptoms due to the loud and overly stimulating environment as well as create a traumatic experience for the mother.

=== Observation ===
According to the ACOG 2017 Guidelines, it is recommended that if the mother has a history of opioid use during pregnancy, then the infant must be monitored by a pediatrician for the possibility of NAS. These guidelines do not specify the length of monitoring. As of 2020 though, the AAP 2020 Guidelines provided more specific guidance in regards to the timeline recommended for monitoring. According to the AAP 2020 Guidelines, all infants who have been exposed to chronic opioid use of the mother during pregnancy must be monitored for at least 72 hours. The guidelines go further into detail depending on the specific exposure: 3 days of monitoring if the substance were immediate-release opioids, 4–7 days if the substance was buprenorphine and sustained-released opioids, and 5–7 days if the substance was methadone.

=== Nonpharmacologic interventions ===
Non-medication based approaches to treat neonatal symptoms include swaddling the infant in a blanket, minimizing environmental stimuli, and monitoring sleeping and feeding patterns. Newborns who stay in their mother's rooms typically need less opioids and have shorter hospital stays. Breastfeeding promotes infant attachment and bonding and is associated with a decreased need for medication. These approaches may lessen the severity of NAS and lead to shorter hospital stays.

=== Pharmacotherapy ===
Nonpharmacological interventions are usually prioritized for the treatment of infants with NAS, but for those experiencing severe opioid withdrawal then the use of medications is to be considered. Medications are used to minimize clinical signs of withdrawal including fever, seizures, and weight loss or dehydration. When pharmacotherapy is deemed necessary for severe opioid withdrawal, opioids are the treatment of choice and then they are slowly tapered down. According to the AAP 2020 Guidelines, it is recommended to use opioids with a longer half-life like buprenorphine and methadone, and to take caution if the preparation has a high alcohol content. Additionally, it is recommended that paregoric and deodorized tinctures of opium do not be used for treatment. Although naloxone is one of the recommended treatments for opioid withdrawal in adults, it is not recommended for the use of NAS due to the possibility of it precipitating rapid withdrawal and seizures.

Phenobarbital helps to regain weight and reduces the duration of supportive care, but increases the duration of hospitalization, compared to supportive care alone; phenobarbital seems to be more effective than diazepam or chlorpromazine. Clonidine is an emerging add-on therapy.

Opioids such as neonatal morphine solution and methadone are commonly used to treat clinical symptoms of opiate withdrawal, but may prolong neonatal drug exposure and duration of hospitalization. A study demonstrated a shorter wean duration in infants treated with methadone compared to those treated with diluted tincture of opium. When compared to morphine, methadone has a longer half-life in children, which allows for less frequent dosing intervals and steady serum concentrations to prevent neonatal withdrawal symptoms.

== Epidemiology ==
NAS rates correlate with rates of opioid use disorder among pregnant individuals in the population. The misuse of opioids, along with other illicit substances by this group has increased since the early 2000s, all this while cases and this problem are likely being underreported.

In 2012, a study inspected information on hospital discharges across 44 states in the United States, which totaled to 7.4 million discharges. Their goal was to measure NAS trends over the past 10 years. The study found that the number of pregnant individuals using opiates increased from 1.2 to 5.6 per 1,000 hospital births every year.

A 2013 study examined the incidence of neonatal abstinence syndrome in 28 states. The researchers found that this rate increased by about 300% (from 1.5 cases to 6.0 cases per 1,000 hospital births) during 1999 to 2013. Along with these results, there have been considerable differences in state NAS incidence, with lows and highs ranging from 0.7 per 1,000 births in Hawaii, to 33.4 per 1,000 births in West Virginia. These contrasts could potentially come as a result of illegal opioid use prevalence, difference in state to state opioid prescribing rates, and the use of the NAS diagnosis, all making it difficult to average national incidence of NAS.

A 2017 Centers for Disease Control (CDC) report stated that the number of babies born with NAS increased nationally by 82% from 2010 to 2017. This correlates to a NAS rate of 7.3 per 1,000 hospital births. This increase was seen for the majority of the states that participated, although with variation between states.

In 2023, the American Academy of Pediatrics (AAP) estimated that the incidence of NAS increased to 8.8 cases per 1,000 hospital births. This study also stated that this rate varied by region, agreeing with prior studies.

In 2024, a study evaluated the early results of the 2020 American Academy of Pediatrics guidelines for managing neonatal opioid withdrawal symptoms. These guidelines proposed using non-pharmacological approaches as first line treatment. The study itself saw a reduction in infant NICU admission and pharmacological treatments. More data is needed to evaluate the change in incidence trends after implementation of these guidelines.

== Geography ==
Neonatal abstinence syndrome is a growing health issue across Canada. While Ontario claims the highest rate of narcotic use in the country and one of the highest rates of prescription narcotic use in the world. Northern cities such as North Bay are influential contributors. The number of neonates born with addiction or experiencing withdrawal symptoms are increasing at an undesirable rate in North Bay from 22 babies in 2012–2013 to 48 babies born with NAS in 2014–2015. Furthermore, North Bay Regional Health Centre was home to 10 NAS babies in January 2016 alone. The dramatic growth in numbers of neonates born with drug addiction will continue to grow if not confronted and managed in a way that is specific and appropriate for the city of North Bay.
