= Finnegan scoring system =

- Purpose: Diagnose neonatal withdrawal

The Finnegan scoring system is used to quantify and diagnose neonatal withdrawal or abstinence (NAS) syndrome. This is a withdrawal syndrome of infants, caused by the cessation of the administration of licit or illicit drugs. Neonatal abstinence syndrome is a group of problems that occur in a newborn who was exposed to addictive opiate or other drugs in utero. There are two types of NAS: prenatal and postnatal. Prenatal NAS is caused by discontinuation of drugs taken by the pregnant mother, while postnatal NAS is caused by discontinuation of drugs directly to the infant. The twenty-one signs of withdrawal are scored. The scoring assessment is based upon the pathological significance and severity of the symptoms. Symptoms can be managed with medication. Though lengthy, it remains when used by trained clinicians. Bias and subjectivity can have some affect. The Finnegan scale is also used to assess the effectiveness of treatment and recovery of the infant. Assessment is performed and then scored. A daily score is calculated. The decision to treat the infant may be based upon a higher score. The Finnegan scale is used with assessment of comorbidities, prematurity, and clinician experience to guide treatment.
