= Drug Interventions Programme =

The Drug Interventions Programme is a key part of the United Kingdom's strategy for tackling drug abuse. It aims to engage drug-misusing offenders involved in the Criminal Justice system in formal addiction treatment and other support, thereby reducing drug-related harm and reducing offending behaviour. Introduced in 2003, it formed a part of both of New Labour's '10 year' drug strategies. In their 2010 Drug Strategy, the Conservative / Liberal Democrat coalition state their continued intention to support DIP.

== Overview ==
The Drug Interventions Programme (DIP) is the UK's main Criminal Justice initiative aimed at engaging substance misusing offenders in drug treatment. It does this through a variety of methods, some coercive, such as the Tough Choices programme, and some relying on voluntary engagement. Class A drug-misusing offenders are identified on their journey through the CJS and steered towards treatment and wraparound support. Key points of intervention include following a positive drugs test in police custody, and following release from prison.

DIP's key partners include police, the probation service, prisons, courts and other criminal justice agencies, as well as the National Treatment Agency and the Department of Health. It is hard to discern the precise cost of DIP. Whilst DIP Key Messages (of February 2009) identified that 'over £600 million has been invested in DIP', DIP's Operational Handbook (also 2009) put the figure at 'over £900m'.

Some evidence has been taken to suggest that DIP has been effective in achieving its aims, though a serious shortfall in methodologically rigorous evaluations makes such claims problematic. Nonetheless, in his foreword to the 2008 Drug Strategy the Home Secretary claimed that DIP coercion and case management have 'contributed to a fall in recorded acquisitive crime of around 20 per cent'. A short while later, DIP Key Messages made rather grander claims: 'since 2003, acquisitive crime (which is strongly associated with class A substance misuse) has fallen by 32 per cent in England and Wales.

== Tough Choices ==
In December 2005, aspects of the Drugs Act 2005 were piloted at various DIPs around the country. Under the heading "Tough Choices", this included a "Test on Arrest" procedure, a "Required Assessment and Follow Up Assessment" process and an extension of the "Restrictions on Bail" scheme, which was legislated for under Section 19 of the Criminal Justice Act 2003. Since April 2006, Tough Choices has been phased in across England and Wales.

=== Test on Arrest ===
Under the Police and Criminal Evidence Act 1984(PACE), it had been possible for police to drug test Detained Prisoners since 1984. The Drugs Act 2005 introduced, at selected "intensive DIP area" police stations, a mandatory drug test for every individual who had been arrested for a specified list of "trigger offences." Trigger offences were first set out in the Criminal Justice and Court Services Act 2000, and constitute a list of offences known have a clear link to substance misuse (such as Theft). Arrestees may also be tested for 'non-trigger' offences (including, for example, those related to prostitution) with the authority of a police inspector. Individuals who refused to take this test, a "non-intimate saliva sample", could face up to three months in custody and a £2,500 fine. Individuals who tested positive were then compelled to undergo a two-part "Required Assessment" with a drug worker from their local DIP.

=== Required Assessment ===
Individuals who test positive under the "Test on Arrest" scheme are required to see a drug worker for a single appointment. Although the Drugs Act 2005 had introduced a contingency for a "Follow-up Required Assessment" process, this measure was not implemented until March 2007. Individuals who fail to attend either of these appointments could face up to three months in prison or a £2,500 fine.

=== Restrictions on Bail ===
Restrictions on Bail had been introduced under the Criminal Justice Act 2003. This piece of legislation amended the Bail Act 1976 by reversing the presumption of bail to anyone who had tested positive for a class A drug, unless they agreed to undergo assessment and treatment with their local DIP for the duration of their court bail. This effectively obliged courts to implement a bail condition compelling such persons to attend their local DIP. The stated aim of this was to "prevent offending on bail". Failure to abide by this condition could result in the denial of further court bail. Restrictions on Bail was initially piloted in a number of areas but now operates across England and Wales

=== Non-Intensive DIPs ===
All "Drug and Alcohol Action Team" (DAAT) areas in the UK had created a DIP prior to the introduction of Tough Choices. Some of these DIPs, where drug-related crime was perceived to be lower, were labelled "Non-Intensive". Non-Intensive areas were different in one way - local police stations could not legally drug test. However, a Required Assessment and a Restrictions on Bail condition could still be given to people from these areas.

== Prolific and Other Priority Offenders Scheme and DIP ==
In 2004, the Prolific and Other Priority Offenders (PPO) Scheme was set up. A crime reduction initiative, it aims to identify a hard-core of individuals considered responsible for large amounts of crime, and manage them through either rehabilitation or conviction. There are currently 10,000 offenders in the UK who are involved in the PPO scheme, a significant proportion of whom have drug dependency issues. The Home Office encourages DIPs and PPO schemes to work closely together in such cases to ensure effective case management of offenders.

== Controversy ==
Release, a UK charity which advises professionals and the public on criminal justice and drugs matters, strongly opposed the Test-on-Arrest and Required Assessment measures brought in by the Drugs Act 2005. They stated that mandatory drug testing was possibly in contravention with Article 8 of the Human Rights Act 1998, and that the possibility of false positives could lead to mandatory assessments for non-drug using Detained Prisoners. They also queried the Required Assessment process, calling into question the ethics and efficacy of coerced addiction treatment, and highlighting the possible re-direction of resources away from the voluntary treatment sector.

== See also ==
- National Probation Service
- Drug addiction
- Police
- Her Majesty's Prison Service
- Substance dependence
