= Drug Addiction Treatment Act =

US law

The Drug Addiction Treatment Act of 2000 (DATA 2000), Title XXXV, Section 3502 of the Children's Health Act, permits physicians who meet certain qualifications to treat opioid addiction with Schedule III, IV, and V narcotic medications that have been specifically approved by the Food and Drug Administration for that indication.

Since there is only one narcotic medication approved by the FDA for the treatment of opioid use disorder within the schedules given, DATA 2000 essentially governs the prescription of buprenorphine (Schedule III) for the treatment of opioid use disorder. Methadone and LAAM are Schedule II narcotics approved for the same purpose within the highly regulated methadone clinic setting, usually known as an opioid treatment program (OTP).

As of January 1, 2023, DATA 2000 requirements pertaining to special credentialing and registration with the DEA for the prescription of buprenorphine to treat opioid dependence were repealed. This event is widely known in medicine as "X'ing the X waiver" and dramatically increased the pool of available practitioners for managing opioid dependence, as anyone with a DEA license able to prescribe schedule III narcotics could now prescribe buprenorphine for addiction.

== Legislative history ==
The Drug Addiction Treatment Act of 2000 was authored by Senator Orrin Hatch (R-UT), Senator Joe Biden (D-DE), and Senator Carl Levin (D-MI).

== DATA 2000 waiver ==
Under the Act, physicians may apply for a waiver to prescribe buprenorphine for the treatment of opioid addiction or dependence outside of an opioid treatment program (OTP). Requirements include a current state medical license, a valid DEA registration number, specialty or subspecialty certification in addiction from the American Board of Medical Specialties, American Society of Addiction Medicine, or American Osteopathic Association. Exceptions were also created for physicians who participated in the initial studies of buprenorphine and for state certification of addiction specialists. However, the Act was intended to bring the treatment of addiction back to the primary care provider. Thus most waivers are obtained after taking an 8-hour course from one of the five medical organizations designated in the Act and otherwise approved by the Secretary of the Department of Health and Human Services.

When physicians qualify for the waiver, they are given a second DEA number (i.e., in addition to the standard DEA prescribing number). This number begins with 'X', prompting the common nickname 'X-waiver'. Once prescribers obtain the waiver, they may treat up to 30 patients with buprenorphine-- following recent federal changes described below, they can request to increase their patient panel sizes after they have had a waiver for one year.

== Recent changes impacting the DATA waiver and buprenorphine prescribing ==
The Comprehensive Addiction Recovery Act of 2016 allowed for qualifying physician assistants and nurse practitioners to obtain DATA waivers.

In July 2016, the Department of Health and Human Services issued a final rule, “Medication Assisted Treatment for Opioid Use Disorders”, in the Federal Register (81 FR 44712). This rule, effective on October 27, 2016, allowed eligible prescribers who have already held a waiver for one year to apply to treat up to 275 patients, up from the previous ceiling of 100.

The SUPPORT Act of 2018 further amended the definition of “qualifying other practitioner” to include clinical nurse specialists (CNS), certified registered nurse anesthetists (CRNA), and certified nurse midwives (CNW) until October 1, 2023. Such "qualifying other providers" are subject to 24 hours of qualifying training while physicians are required to complete 8.

== Historic prescribing limits ==
"Qualifying physicians can treat 100 patients in the first year if they meet the criteria outlined in the SUPPORT Act, and 275 after one year of prescribing at the 100-patient limit. If a physician does not meet the criteria to treat 100 patients in the first year, they would have to prescribe at the 30-patient limit for one year before requesting an increase to 100 patients, and then treat at the 100-patient limit for one year before requesting an increase to 275 patients."
