= Methadone clinic =

Substance use disorder services clinic

A methadone clinic is a medical facility where medications for opioid use disorder (MOUD) are dispensed. Historically and most commonly, these MOUDs are methadone, although buprenorphine is also increasingly prescribed. Medically assisted drug therapy treatment is indicated in patients who are opioid-dependent or have a history of opioid dependence. Methadone is a schedule II (USA) opioid analgesic, that is also prescribed for pain management. It is a long-acting opioid that can delay the opioid withdrawal symptoms that patients experience from taking short-acting opioids, like heroin, and allow time for withdrawal management. In the United States, by law, patients must receive methadone under the supervision of a physician, and dispensed through the Opioid Treatment Program (OTP) certified by the Substance Abuse and Mental Health Services Administration (SAMHSA) and registered with the Drug Enforcement Administration (DEA).

The usual process at the clinic is dispensing methadone daily in liquid form, and ingestion is supervised by the physician. Initially, methadone treatment consists of 30mg to 40mg of methadone. Initial doses are followed by increases in the following days until withdrawal symptoms are suppressed. Many patients with opioid use disorder see effective results in symptom management and compliance on 80mg to 120mg of methadone per day. Although there is no set schedule for the gradual increase of dosage, patients typically experience a 5mg to 10mg increase each day for 5-7 days, until they are maintaining a 60mg per day dosage under physician observation.

== Regulation and policy ==
In the United States, there are approximately 1,500 methadone clinics that are federally certified opioid treatment programs. There are generally two types of methadone clinics, public and private. The public clinics are generally cheaper to attend. However, there is usually a waiting list due to limited funding. The private clinics are more expensive to attend but usually have either a short or no waiting list. In many parts of the United States, methadone clinics are few and far between, which presents problems for addicts seeking methadone treatment who live far from a clinic. All methadone clinics must register as an accredited opioid treatment program with the Substance Abuse and Mental Health Service Administration and renew yearly or every three years based on the accreditation time frame awarded. Additionally, methadone clinics must register with the Drug Enforcement Administration before methadone can be dispensed. While not restricted to adults, this treatment method is generally not considered for people under the age of 18.

Methadone clinics in the United States operate under strict regulations by state and federal laws. Before entering treatment, a patient must be given adequate information to provide informed consent about starting treatment. This information includes reasons for treatment and recommendations, the side effects and risks of treatment, and rules that must be followed to receive methadone treatment. After a physician ensures that the patient voluntarily chooses to receive treatment through a consent form, treatment planning can begin. The patient must show current addiction to an opioid, using accepted medical criteria such as those listed in the DSM-5 and have evidence that he or she became addicted at least 1 year before admission for treatment. Before administration of treatment, a clinical evaluation is required asking about drug use history, co-occurring disorders, and impact of substance use on life, along with providing information about the treatment goals and guidelines. A medical evaluation is also given in the form of a urinalysis test, a review of past and current health history, and a test for certain conditions which are known to be prevalent in addict populations, such as HIV, hepatitis, and tuberculosis. The medication is monitored by nursing staff and is prescribed by a physician. As of 2013, due to the strict changes in receiving prescription pain medication as well as decreases in non-medical prescription use, the requirements to be accepted into methadone clinics have changed in areas such as New York State.

== United States ==
=== United States ===
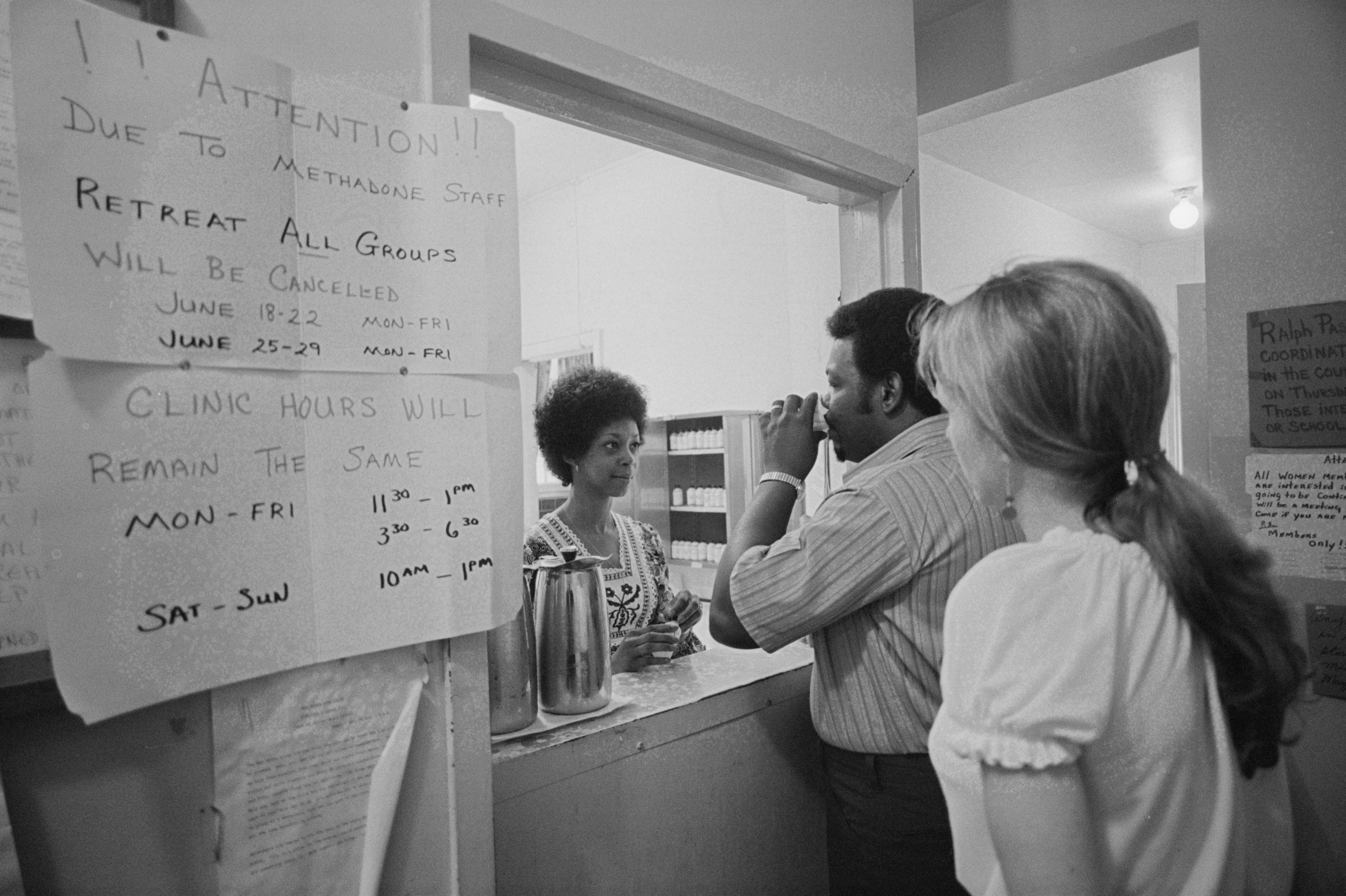
A methadone clinic in New Haven, Connecticut, 1973

Before the 1960s, abstinence-based detox was the only option for opioid addicts in the United States and produced high relapse rates. However, in 1965, clinicians at Rockefeller University published a report in the Journal of the American Medical Association of the successful treatment of 22 men addicted to heroin with the use of orally administered methadone. In September 1969, the first methadone maintenance treatment program was created in Washington, D.C. by Robert DuPont, M.D, that oversaw 25 parolees. Currently methadone must be provided through opioid treatment programs (OTP) in the United States and can not be prescribed in office settings.

Although not required by regulation at this time in the United States, people are usually encouraged to attempt other types of treatment methods before entering methadone treatment programs. Since its use began in the 1960s, methadone is still the preferred choice of treatment at the clinics, and is often part of other protocols. The National Institute on Drug Abuse (NIDA) provides the protocol of how to treat addiction with recommended options including medication assisted treatment, cognitive behavioral therapy (CBT), and medical withdrawal management. Other than methadone, newer medications with fewer side effects including buprenorphine and naltrexone have been introduced, relieve drug cravings, block opioid effects, and avoid physical dependence. CBT is an individualized treatment plan that allow therapists to explore patterns of maladaptive substance use to help generate alternative behavior skills. Medical withdrawal management ensures safety and comfort by providing long-term monitoring until the symptoms of withdrawals are over.

An important part of treatment for addiction is counseling. Methadone clinics are only for recovering addicts from opioids. Clinics require attendance at counseling groups as well as individual counseling contacts. It is generally accepted that the more intensive the counseling contacts the individual is willing to submit to, the higher the success rate of the program. Also, an integral part of counseling is on preventing the exposure and transmission of HIV. Clinics should be able to provide or refer patients to various services: community resources, vocational rehabilitation, education, employment, and prenatal-care. There is no set guideline for duration of methadone treatment, however, longer treatments are associated with better outcomes. Patients receiving methadone treatment in a closed setting should be assisted when transferring to a community-based setting. Patients who voluntarily decide to stop methadone treatment should speak to their provider to discuss why they want to stop and other treatment options.

Access to methadone treatment in the United States varies considerably by state, and research suggests that states with policies expanding access have seen meaningfully better outcomes for patients with opioid use disorder. Stigma surrounding opioid addiction may pose additional barriers beyond geography and cost.

In February 2024, SAMHSA made several policy flexibilities that had been introduced during the COVID-19 pandemic permanent. These changes allow patients to receive up to 28 days of methadone at home after just one month in treatment, permit some services to be delivered via telehealth, and expand the range of providers authorized to dispense methadone, including to nurse practitioners and physician assistants. Advocates have welcomed these reforms as a step toward reducing the logistical and social burdens that have historically kept methadone treatment out of reach for many patients.

Stigma around methadone treatment may also occur along other dimensions, including race, age, and socioeconomic status. Research suggests Black or Latino/Latina patients may be more likely than White patients to receive lower dosages than are appropriate for effective methadone treatment.

== Use of methadone clinics internationally ==
Methadone clinics can provide methadone for on-site administration. Additionally, some methadone clinics provide the following: oversight of treatment, observed dosing, consultation services, urine drug test, naloxone distribution, mental health services, primary care services, and HIV and HCV services.

=== Canada ===
In Canada, methadone can be prescribed in office settings and then picked up by patients at their local pharmacies. Regulations for methadone are made at the provincial level in Canada in comparison to the United States where much of the regulations comes from a federal level. While these offices offer counseling services, they are not required in order to receive methadone treatment. This practice coupled with methadone being accessible at community pharmacies makes the treatment more accessible to communities.

In 1972, Canada's Narcotics Control Act prohibited the prescription of methadone to patients which stood in effect until 1996 when regulation of methadone became decentralized. Prescribers were still required to receive a federal exemption to prescribe methadone until 2018, during a spike in opioid overdose deaths, when the federal government removed this previously needed authorization. Nurse practitioners are also allowed to prescribe methadone in Canada. There is encouraged communication between the prescriber and pharmacist overseeing the treatment. Methadone will be denied to patients that show up to pharmacies visibly intoxicated or sedated state. In addition to pharmacies, methadone can be dispensed in assisted living facilities, long-term care facilities, and jails/prisons.

=== Ukraine ===
The epidemic of HIV/AIDS in Ukraine is quickly growing and was the reason for research into opioid agonist therapies (OAT) in the country as a means to curb the spread of HIV. Ukraine has the highest rate of HIV in Europe at 1.2% and most of the spread of HIV in Ukraine is primarily through people who inject drugs and secondarily through these drug users sexual partners. In 2016, opioid agonist therapies were only being given to 2.7% of the 346,000 people who inject drugs in Ukraine.

OAT utilized Buprenorphine starting in 2004 and Methadone in 2008. However, due to the cost of OAT, government regulation prohibits the number of patients that can receive such therapies at a time, meaning a new patient can enter only after another has left. From 2010 to 2013 this number patients remained at a ceiling of roughly 9,000 patients throughout the country. As of 2016 OAT for these 9,000 patients is being administered only by narcologists at 174 licensed treatment centers.

=== Kyrgyzstan ===
Kyrgyzstan has a similar HIV/AIDS problem as Ukraine and to try and combat this, started a trial methadone program within prisons. The first program started in a solo prison is 2002 and expanded to multiple in 2008. It is estimated that half of incarcerated individuals in Kyrgyzstan inject drugs and the use of unsterilized needles and transfer of HIV is higher in the prison setting. While the offering of methadone in prisons would help curb the spread of HIV/AIDS, the internal prison governance of inmates and their reliance on the drug trade is a hard barrier. Heroin being used as currency as well as methadone users being assigned to separate living quarters than non-users creates a social separation between users and non-users. These outcasting factors can make methadone treatment not worth it for some inmates. The number of eligible prisoners using methadone through a methadone program is estimated at only 7%.

== Effectiveness ==
While methadone clinics are generally considered to be effective treatment options for patients addicted to opioids, especially when other interventions have failed, there is controversy surrounding the placement of methadone clinics. There is a perception that the presence of the clinics attracts crime to surrounding areas. However, one study by the University of Maryland School of Medicine found that crime rates do not increase when a methadone clinic is opened. Another study by University of Pennsylvania found within a 200 m radius, the presence of a methadone clinic causes a significant decrease in property and total crime but a significant increase in drug and violent crime. A 2004 GAO study notes that placement of clinics can impede recovery and exacerbate relapse:

"Although these clinics are intended to help those in need of rehabilitation, patients who seek treatment must navigate their way to and from the clinics in an environment in which illegal sales of narcotics are daily occurrences. The efforts of patients who are seeking rehabilitation, and clinic professionals who serve them, are significantly undermined by this criminal activity that surrounds them."

Between 70 and 90% of patients who discontinue methadone maintenance will relapse. The high relapse rate may be partially due to the severity of cases seen at methadone clinics, as well as the long-term effects of opioid use. Some patients stay on methadone for the rest of their lives, which generates criticism regarding the effectiveness of the clinics. Supporters argue that the clinics aim not just to eliminate narcotic addictions, but also to help people function in their lives.

Methadone clinics may decrease the use of emergency rooms by patients addicted to opioids According to a 2009 Cochrane review, methadone maintenance treatments decreased the likelihood that heroin dependent patients would use heroin, but did not change crime or mortality rates. However, the bulk of the current research supports the hypothesis that methadone clinics do in fact reduce overdose and substance-related crime.
