= Buprenorphine =

Opioid used to treat pain and opioid use disorder

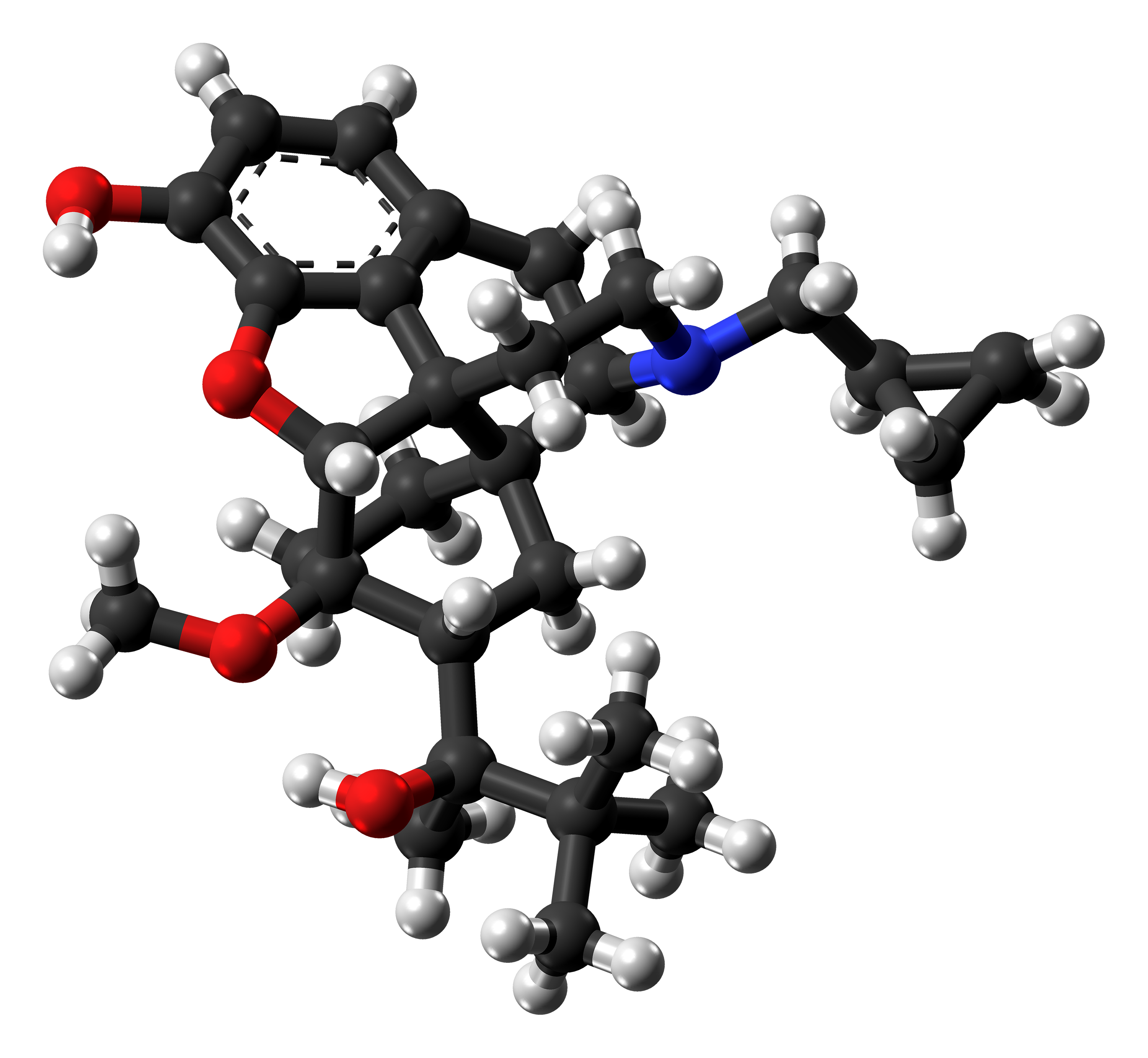

Clinical data
- Pronunciation: bew-pre-nor-feen
- Trade names: Subutex, Sublocade, Belbuca, Brixadi, others
- Other names: SK-2110; SK2110
- AHFS/Drugs.com: Monograph
- MedlinePlus: a605002
- License data: US DailyMed: Buprenorphine
- Pregnancy category: AU: C
- Dependence liability: Psychological: High; Physical: Moderate
- Routes of administration: Sublingual, buccal, intramuscular, intravenous, transdermal, intranasal, rectal, subcutaneous
- Drug class: Opioid
- ATC code: N02AE01 (WHO) N07BC01 (WHO)

Legal status
- Legal status: AU: S8 (Controlled drug); BR: Class A1 (Narcotic drugs); CA: Schedule I; DE: Anlage III (Special prescription form required); UK: Class C; US: Schedule III; UN: Psychotropic Schedule III; EU: Rx-only; SE: Förteckning IV

Pharmacokinetic data
- Bioavailability: Sublingual: 30% Intranasal: 48% Buccal: 65% IV/IM: 100%
- Protein binding: 96%
- Metabolism: Liver (CYP3A4, CYP2C8)
- Metabolites: Norbuprenorphine, Hydroxybuprenorphine, Hydroxynorbuprenorphine, Buprenorphine glucuronide
- Onset of action: Within 30 minutes
- Elimination half-life: 37 hours (range 20–70 hours)
- Duration of action: Up to 24 hours
- Excretion: Bile duct and kidney

Identifiers
- IUPAC name: (2S)-2-[(5R,6R,7R,14S)-17-cyclopropylmethyl-4,5-epoxy-6,14-ethano-3-hydroxy-6-methoxymorphinan-7-yl]-3,3-dimethylbutan-2-ol
- CAS Number: 52485-79-7
- PubChem CID: 644073
- IUPHAR/BPS: 1670
- DrugBank: DB00921
- ChemSpider: 559124
- UNII: 40D3SCR4GZ
- KEGG: D07132
- ChEBI: CHEBI:3216
- ChEMBL: ChEMBL511142
- CompTox Dashboard (EPA): DTXSID2022705
- ECHA InfoCard: 100.052.664

Chemical and physical data
- Formula: C_{29}H_{41}NO_{4}
- Molar mass: 467.650 g·mol^{−1}
- 3D model (JSmol): Interactive image
- SMILES: Oc7ccc5c1c7O[C@H]3[C@]6(OC)[C@H](C[C@@]2([C@H](N(CC[C@@]123)CC4CC4)C5)CC6)[C@@](O)(C)C(C)(C)C
- InChI: InChI=1S/C29H41NO4/c1-25(2,3)26(4,32)20-15-27-10-11-29(20,33-5)24-28(27)12-13-30(16-17-6-7-17)21(27)14-18-8-9-19(31)23(34-24)22(18)28/h8-9,17,20-21,24,31-32H,6-7,10-16H2,1-5H3/t20-,21-,24-,26+,27-,28+,29-/m1/s1; Key:RMRJXGBAOAMLHD-IHFGGWKQSA-N

Buprenorphine is an opioid used to treat opioid use disorder, acute pain, and chronic pain. It is administered under the tongue, in the cheek, by injection (intravenous or subcutaneous), or as a skin patch or implant. Maximum pain relief generally occurs within an hour and lasts up to 24 hours. In the United States, buprenorphine/naloxone (Suboxone) is usually prescribed to discourage injection misuse. Both formulations are Schedule III controlled substances.

Buprenorphine acts as an agonist, partial agonist, or antagonist at different opioid receptors. It relieves opioid withdrawal and reduces the effects of other opioids. Unlike full agonists such as heroin and methadone, it has a ceiling effect for some effects, including respiratory depression, but retains misuse potential.

Side effects include respiratory depression, sleepiness, adrenal insufficiency, QT prolongation, low blood pressure, allergic reactions, constipation, and opioid addiction. It may increase seizure risk in susceptible people; opioid withdrawal after discontinuation is generally less severe than with other opioids. Safety during pregnancy is unclear, but use while breastfeeding is probably safe: infants receive approximately 1–2% of the maternal weight-adjusted dose.

Buprenorphine was patented in 1965, FDA approved for medical use as an analgesic in 1981, and FDA approved for treating opioid use disorder in 2002. It is on the World Health Organization's List of Essential Medicines. Despite originally being marketed as an analgesic it is far more commonly prescribed and used to treat opioid use disorder, such as addiction to heroin. In 2020, it was the 186th most commonly prescribed medication in the United States, with more than 2.8 million prescriptions.

== Medical uses ==
=== Opioid use disorder ===
Buprenorphine is used to treat people with opioid use disorder. In the U.S., the combination formulation of buprenorphine/naloxone is generally prescribed to deter injection, since naloxone, an opioid antagonist, is believed to cause acute withdrawal if the formulation is crushed and injected. Taken orally, the naloxone has virtually no effect, due to the drug's extremely high first-pass metabolism and low bioavailability (2%).

Before starting buprenorphine, individuals with opioid dependence are generally advised to wait after their last dose of opioid, often 24–72 hours, because if taken too soon buprenorphine can displace other opioids bound to the receptors and precipitate an acute withdrawal. The dose of buprenorphine is then adjusted until symptoms improve, and individuals remain on a maintenance dose, often 8–16 mg.

Because withdrawal is uncomfortable and a deterrent for many patients, users have called for different means of treatment initiation. The Bernese method, also known as microdose induction, was described in 2016, where very small doses of buprenorphine (0.2 to 0.5 mg) are given while patients are still using street opioids, with medicine levels slowly titrated upward without precipitating withdrawal. This method has been used by some providers as of the 2020s. Many of the publications on the Bernese method are case reports, case series, or clinical guidance rather than large randomized controlled trials (RCTs). For example, a CMAJ article noted that only two case reports and one small case series existed at the time of writing, and guidance documents typically state that micro-dosing is not yet a fully evidence-based alternative compared with standard induction. Furthermore, the phrase "without precipitating withdrawal" should be understood as "typically less likely to precipitate withdrawal" rather than guaranteed to avoid it. Clinicians adopting this method must do so with caution, informed consent, and close monitoring — particularly because many of the studies are small, heterogeneous, and variable in protocol.

==== Buprenorphine versus methadone ====
Both buprenorphine and methadone are medications used for detoxification and opioid replacement therapy, and appear to have similar effectiveness based on limited data. Both are safe for pregnant women with opioid use disorder, although preliminary evidence suggests that methadone is more likely to cause neonatal abstinence syndrome. In the US and European Union, only designated clinics can prescribe buprenorphine or methadone for opioid use disorder, requiring patients to travel to the clinic daily. If patients are drug-free for a period they may be permitted to receive "take-home doses," reducing their visits to as little as once a week. Alternatively, up to a month's supply of buprenorphine has been able to be prescribed by clinicians in the US or Europe who have completed basic training (8–24 hours in the US) and received a waiver/licence allowing the prescription of the medicine. In France, buprenorphine prescription for opioid use disorder has been permitted without any special training or restrictions since 1995, resulting in treatment of approximately ten times more patients per year with buprenorphine than with methadone in the following decade. In 2021, seeking to address record levels of opioid overdose, the United States also removed the requirement for a special waiver (X-waiver) for prescribing physicians. In the years that have followed, statistics reveal a significant improvement in accessibility for the treatment of opioid use disorder. [2]

=== Chronic pain ===
Buprenorphine patches in the pouch with packaging: A removed patch is shown on the left. In Britain, buprenorphine patches are named Butec 5, Butec 10, and so on.

A transdermal patch is available for the treatment of chronic pain. These patches are not indicated for use in acute pain, pain that is expected to last only for a short period, or pain after surgery, nor are they recommended for opioid addiction.

=== Potency ===
For equianalgesic dosing, when used sublingually, the potency of buprenorphine is about 40 to 70 times more potent than morphine. When used as a transdermal patch, the potency of buprenorphine may be 100 to 115 times greater than that of morphine.

== Adverse effects ==
Table from the 2010 ISCD study ranking various drugs (legal and illegal) based on statements by drug-harm experts. Buprenorphine was found to be the 19th overall most dangerous drug.

Addiction experts in psychiatry, chemistry, pharmacology, forensic science, epidemiology, and the police and legal services engaged in delphic analysis regarding 20 popular recreational drugs. Buprenorphine was ranked 9th in dependence, 8th in physical harm, and 11th in social harm.

Common adverse drug reactions associated with the use of buprenorphine, similar to those of other opioids, include nausea and vomiting, drowsiness, dizziness, headache, memory loss, cognitive and neural inhibition, perspiration, itchiness, dry mouth, shrinking of the pupils of the eyes (miosis), orthostatic hypotension, male ejaculatory difficulty, decreased libido, and urinary retention. Constipation and central nervous system (CNS) effects are seen less frequently than with morphine. Central sleep apnea has also been reported as a side effect of long-term buprenorphine use.

=== Respiratory effects ===
The most severe side effect associated with buprenorphine is respiratory depression (insufficient breathing). It occurs more often in those who are also taking benzodiazepines or alcohol, or have underlying lung disease. The usual reversal agents for opioids, such as naloxone, may be only partially effective, and additional efforts to support breathing may be required. Respiratory depression may be less than with other opioids, particularly with chronic use. In the setting of acute pain management, though, buprenorphine appears to cause the same rate of respiratory depression as other opioids such as morphine. Central sleep apnea is possible with long-term use, possibly resolving with dose reduction.

=== Buprenorphine dependence ===
Buprenorphine treatment carries the risk of causing psychological or physiological (physical) dependencies. It has a slow onset of activity, with a long duration of action, and a long half-life of 24 to 60 hours. Once a patient has stabilised on the (buprenorphine) medication and programme, three options remain: continual use (buprenorphine-only medication), switching to a buprenorphine/naloxone combination, or a medically supervised withdrawal.

=== Pain management ===
Achieving acute opioid analgesia is difficult in persons using buprenorphine for pain management. However, a systematic review found no clear benefit to bridging or stopping buprenorphine when used in opioid substitution therapy to facilitate perioperative pain management, but failure to restart it was found to pose concerns for relapse. Therefore, it is recommended that buprenorphine opioid substitution therapy is continued in the perioperative period when possible. In addition, preoperative pain management in patients taking buprenorphine should use an interdisciplinary approach with multimodal analgesia.

== Pharmacology ==
=== Pharmacodynamics ===
Buprenorphine
Site	K_{i} (nM)	Action	Species	Stimulation	Ref
MOR	0.2~0.9; 0.081	Partial agonist	Human; Monkey	48%±5%	
DOR	2.9–6.1; 0.82	Antagonist	Human; Monkey	0	
KOR	0.62–2.5; 0.44	Antagonist/functional antagonism	Human; Monkey	9%±5	
NOP	77.4	Partial agonist	Human	~50%±10% (8 mg≥)	
σ_{1}	>100,000	ND	ND		
σ_{2}	ND	ND	ND		ND
NMDA	ND	ND	ND		ND
TLR4	>10,000	Agonist	Human		
SERT	>100,000	ND	Rat		
NET	>100,000	ND	Rat		
DAT	ND	ND	ND		ND
VGSC	33,000 (IC_{50})	Inhibitor	Rodent		
Values are K_{i} (nM), unless otherwise noted. The smaller the value, the more strongly the drug binds to the site.

==== Opioid receptor modulator ====
Buprenorphine has been reported to possess these following pharmacological activities:

- μ-Opioid receptor (MOR): extremely high affinity partial agonist: at low doses, the MOR-mediated effects of buprenorphine are comparable to those of other narcotics, but these effects reach a "ceiling" as the receptor population is saturated. This behavior is responsible for several unique properties: buprenorphine greatly reduces the effect of most other MOR agonists, can cause precipitated withdrawal when used in actively opioid dependent persons, and has a lower incidence of respiratory depression relative to full MOR agonists.
- κ-Opioid receptor (KOR): High affinity antagonist/weak partial agonist —this activity is hypothesized to underlie some of the effects of buprenorphine on mood disorders and addiction.
- δ-Opioid receptor (DOR): High affinity antagonist
- Nociceptin receptor (NOP, ORL-1): Weak affinity, very weak partial agonist

In simplified terms, buprenorphine can essentially be thought of as a nonselective, mixed agonist–antagonist opioid receptor modulator, acting as an unusually high affinity, weak partial agonist of the MOR, a high affinity antagonist of the KOR and DOR, and a relatively low affinity, very weak partial agonist of the ORL-1/NOP.

Although buprenorphine is a partial agonist of the MOR, human studies have found that it acts like a full agonist with respect to analgesia in opioid-intolerant individuals. Conversely, buprenorphine behaves like a partial agonist of the MOR with respect to respiratory depression.

Buprenorphine is also known to have high binding affinity with antagonistic activity at the putative ε-opioid receptor.

Full analgesic efficacy of buprenorphine requires both exon 11- and exon 1-associated μ-opioid receptor splice variants.

The active metabolites of buprenorphine are not thought to be clinically important in its CNS effects.

In positron emission tomography (PET) imaging studies, buprenorphine was found to decrease whole-brain MOR availability due to receptor occupancy by 41% (i.e., 59% availability) at 2 mg, 80% (i.e., 20% availability) at 16 mg, and 84% (i.e., 16% availability) at 32 mg.

==== Other actions ====
Unlike some other opioids and opioid antagonists, buprenorphine binds only weakly to and possesses little if any activity at the sigma receptor.

Buprenorphine also blocks voltage-gated sodium channels via the local anesthetic binding site, and this underlies its potent local anesthetic properties.

Similarly to various other opioids, buprenorphine has also been found to act as an agonist of the toll-like receptor 4, albeit with very low affinity.

=== Pharmacokinetics ===
Buprenorphine is metabolized by the liver, via CYP3A4 (also CYP2C8 seems to be involved) isozymes of the cytochrome P450 enzyme system, into norbuprenorphine (by N-dealkylation). The glucuronidation of buprenorphine is primarily carried out by UGT1A1 and UGT2B7, and that of norbuprenorphine by UGT1A1 and UGT1A3. These glucuronides are then eliminated mainly through excretion into bile. The elimination half-life of buprenorphine is 20 to 73 hours (mean 37 hours). Due to the mainly hepatic elimination, no risk of accumulation exists in people with renal impairment.

One of the major active metabolites of buprenorphine is norbuprenorphine, which, in contrast to buprenorphine itself, is a full agonist of the MOR, DOR, and ORL-1, and a partial agonist at the KOR. However, relative to buprenorphine, norbuprenorphine has extremely little antinociceptive potency (1/50th that of buprenorphine), but markedly depresses respiration (10-fold more than buprenorphine). This may be explained by very poor brain penetration of norbuprenorphine due to a high affinity of the compound for P-glycoprotein. In contrast to norbuprenorphine, buprenorphine and its glucuronide metabolites are negligibly transported by P-glycoprotein.

The glucuronides of buprenorphine and norbuprenorphine are also biologically active, and represent major active metabolites of buprenorphine. Buprenorphine-3-glucuronide has affinity for the MOR (K_{i} = 4.9 pM), DOR (K_{i} = 270 nM) and ORL-1 (K_{i} = 36 μM), and no affinity for the KOR. It has a small antinociceptive effect and no effect on respiration. Norbuprenorphine-3-glucuronide has no affinity for the MOR or DOR, but does bind to the KOR (K_{i} = 300 nM) and ORL-1 (K_{i} = 18 μM). It has a sedative effect but no effect on respiration.

== Chemistry ==
Buprenorphine is a semisynthetic derivative of thebaine, and is fairly soluble in water, as its hydrochloride salt. It degrades in the presence of light.

=== Detection in body fluids ===
Buprenorphine and norbuprenorphine may be quantified in blood or urine to monitor use or non-medical recreational use, confirm a diagnosis of poisoning, or assist in a medicolegal investigation. A significant overlap of drug concentrations exists in body fluids within the possible spectrum of physiological reactions ranging from asymptomatic to comatose. Therefore, knowing both the route of administration of the drug and the level of tolerance to opioids of the individual is critical when results are interpreted.

== History ==
Buprenorphine was first synthesised from thebaine in 1966. In 1969, researchers at Reckitt and Colman (now Reckitt Benckiser) had spent 10 years attempting to synthesize an opioid compound "with structures substantially more complex than morphine [that] could retain the desirable actions whilst shedding the undesirable side effects". Physical dependence and withdrawal from buprenorphine itself remain important issues since buprenorphine is a long-acting opioid. Reckitt found success when researchers synthesized RX6029 which had shown success in reducing dependence in test animals. RX6029 was named buprenorphine and began trials on humans in 1971. Buprenorphine was approved for use in humans in 1977 in the UK and 1982 in the US. Buprenorphine was first used in dogs in the 1980s and in cats in the 1990s. A 0.3mg/ml formulation for use in cats was approved in 1995, a higher strength 1.8mg/ml formulation was approved in 2014, and a transdermal patch was approved in 2022.

== Society and culture ==
=== Regulation ===
==== United States ====
In the United States, buprenorphine and buprenorphine with naloxone were approved for opioid use disorder by the Food and Drug Administration in October 2002. The DEA rescheduled buprenorphine from a schedule V drug to a schedule III drug just before approval. The ACSCN for buprenorphine is 9064, and being a schedule III substance, it does not have an annual manufacturing quota imposed by the DEA. The salt in use is hydrochloride, which has a free-base conversion ratio of 0.928.

In the years before buprenorphine/naloxone was approved, Reckitt Benckiser had lobbied Congress to help craft the Drug Addiction Treatment Act of 2000, which gave authority to the Secretary of Health and Human Services to grant a waiver to physicians with certain training to prescribe and administer schedule III, IV, or V narcotic drugs for the treatment of addiction or detoxification. Before this law was passed, such treatment was permitted only in clinics designed specifically for drug addiction.

The waiver, which can be granted after the completion of an eight-hour course, was required for outpatient treatment of opioid addiction with buprenorphine from 2000 to 2021. Initially, the number of people each approved physician could treat was limited to 10. This was eventually modified to allow approved physicians to treat up to 100 people with buprenorphine for opioid addiction in an outpatient setting. This limit was increased by the Obama administration, raising the number of patients to which doctors can prescribe to 275. On 14 January 2021, the US Department of Health and Human Services announced that the waiver would no longer be required to prescribe buprenorphine to treat up to 30 people concurrently.

New Jersey authorized paramedics to give buprenorphine to people at the scene after they have recovered from an overdose.

==== Europe ====
In the European Union, Subutex and Suboxone, buprenorphine's high-dose sublingual tablet preparations, were approved for opioid use disorder treatment in September 2006. In the Netherlands, buprenorphine is a list II drug of the Opium Law, though special rules and guidelines apply to its prescription and dispensation. In France, buprenorphine prescription by general practitioners and dispensed by pharmacies has been permitted since the mid-1990s as a response to HIV and overdose risk. Deaths caused by heroin overdose were reduced by four-fifths between 1994 and 2002, and the incidence of AIDS among people who inject drugs in France fell from 25% in the mid-1990s to 6% in 2010.

=== Barriers to access ===
In the US, the list price for a long-acting injectable form is five to 20 times as much as a daily pill. This has reduced the number of people who are able to get a single monthly dose, instead of daily pills. Some jails consider the more expensive form a positive tradeoff: a single monthly injection may be simpler and easier for the staff to manage than daily trips to the dispensary to have a nurse provide a pill and make sure that it has been swallowed.

=== Brand names ===
Buprenorphine is available under the brand names Cizdol, Brixadi (approved in the US by FDA for addiction treatment in 2023), Suboxone (with naloxone), Subutex (typically used for opioid use disorder), Zubsolv, Bunavail, Buvidal (approved in the UK, Europe and Australia for addiction treatment in 2018), Sublocade (approved in the US in 2018), Probuphine, Temgesic (sublingual tablets for moderate to severe pain), Buprenex (solutions for injection often used for acute pain in primary-care settings), Norspan, and Butrans (transdermal preparations used for chronic pain). In Poland buprenorphine is available under the trade names Bunondol (for pain treatment, when morphine is too little; amounts of 0.2 mg and 0.4 mg) and Bunorfin (for addicts substitution in amount of 2 and 8 mg).

- Bunov, UK
- Espranor, UK

== Research ==
=== Microdosing ===
There is some evidence that a buprenorphine microdosing regime, started before opioid withdrawal symptoms have started, can be effective in helping people transition away from opioid dependence.

=== Depression ===
Some evidence supports the use of buprenorphine for depression. Buprenorphine/samidorphan, a combination product of buprenorphine and samidorphan (a preferential μ-opioid receptor antagonist), appears useful for treatment-resistant depression.

A buprenorphine implant (developmental code name SK-2110) is under development by Shenzhen ScienCare Pharmaceutical in China for the treatment of refractory major depressive disorder.

=== Cocaine dependence ===
In combination with samidorphan or naltrexone (μ-opioid receptor antagonists), buprenorphine is under investigation for the treatment of cocaine dependence, and recently demonstrated effectiveness for this indication in a large-scale (n = 302) clinical trial (at a high buprenorphine dose of 16 mg, but not a low dose of 4 mg).

=== Neonatal abstinence ===
Buprenorphine has been used in the treatment of the neonatal abstinence syndrome, a condition in which newborns exposed to opioids during pregnancy demonstrate signs of withdrawal. In the United States, use currently is limited to infants enrolled in a clinical trial conducted under an FDA-approved investigational new drug (IND) application. Preliminary research suggests that buprenorphine is associated with shorter time in hospital for neonates, compared to methadone. An ethanolic formulation used in neonates is stable at room temperature for at least 30 days.

== Veterinary use ==
Buprenorphine is commonly used as a long-lasting post-operative analgesic in small animal veterinary practice. Buprenorphine can be administered via subcutaneous, transdermal, intravenous, or intramuscular routes. Buprenorphine provides analgesia for 6–8 hours in dogs and 4–8 hours in cats when administered as an intramuscular or intravenous injection. Buprenorphine as a partial agonist of the mu-receptor has less adverse effects than full agonists. A transdermal application can provide analgesia for up to 4 days in cats. The oral-transmucosal route has been investigated due to the potential for client administration but variability in bio-availability and other issues limit this usage. When used in combination with local anaesthetics or a non-steroidal anti-inflammatory drug buprenorphine provides good analgesia for ovariohysterectomies and orchidectomies. In horses buprenorphine can be used for castration and dental extraction; however, buprenorphine is not commonly used in horses as a post-operative analgesic due to potential for adverse gastrointestinal effects and locomotive stimulation. Buprenorphine is commonly given alongside acepromazine or α_{2}-adrenergic receptor agonists.
