= C21H27NO =

The molecular formula C_{21}H_{27}NO (molar mass: 309.44 g/mol) may refer to:

- Benproperine
- Dextromethadone
- Diphenidol
- Isomethadone
- Levomethadone
- Methadone
