= Clinical Opiate Withdrawal Scale =

Clinical Opiate Withdrawal Scale (COWS)

The Clinical Opiate Withdrawal Scale (COWS) is a method used by registered practitioners to measure the severity of a patient's opioid withdrawal symptoms. This method consists of a series of 11 topics each comprising 4–5 common symptoms experienced by a patient undergoing opioid withdrawal. In each topic a rank is given depending on what the patient responds to. Generally, 0 is considered to be no symptom shown and 4 or 5 is considered to be the most common and severe symptom shown. These results are then added up and a final diagnosis is made based on the value obtained. This test is crucial as it allows the practitioner to assess the physiological and psychological behaviours of the patient as well as the severity of each symptom during the duration of the examination. The results are grouped into three categories of mild, moderately severe and severe. Mild consists of 5 to 12 points, moderately severe consists of 13 to 24 points and anything above 36 points is severe and requires direct medical attention.

Scales measuring withdrawal symptoms examine the dependence of an individual on the opioids consumed before undertaking any sort of medical induction such as buprenorphine. Measuring opioid withdrawal symptoms was first introduced to clinics, hospitals and used as a source of evidence for researchers around the mid-1930s. Over time, the progression and development in health and medicine allowed the introduction of new and more advanced scales which tested for more signs and symptoms. The most recent scale that has been introduced is COWS.

This tool provides the opportunity for practitioners to ensure an effective and efficient treatment process. Researchers are also ability to unlock new developments within this area of study.

== Types of opioids ==
An opioid would be classified as any form of synthetic substance that will bind to the opioid receptors within the human brain. These receptors are located in the parts of the brain that generally monitor and maintain pain. There are many heavily regulated prescription medications and most of these are used as strong painkillers. Main opioid drug ingredients include codeine, fentanyl, hydrocodone, hydromorphone, methadone, morphine, oxycodone, oxymorphone, and tapentadol, among others.

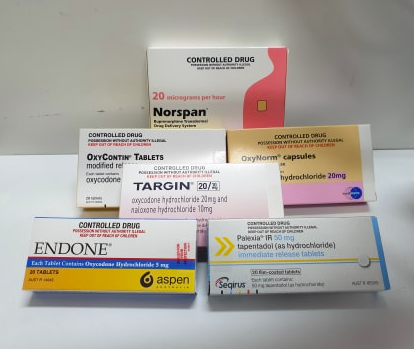
Commonly prescribed schedule 8 opioid medications in Australia

These analgesic drugs bind and acts on opioid receptors in both the gastrointestinal and central nervous system to alleviate moderate to severe pain. This sedating medication acts on receptors known as mu-receptors to reduce pain radiation across the body. These can come in the form of extended release medication or immediate release depending on the condition and type of medication being consumed.

== Effect of opioid ==
Opioids are commonly used for patients who are undergoing cancer treatment, chronic pain and postoperative pain. Although these drugs are suitable for treatment, in long term patients or a misuse of these drugs can increase the risk of toxicity, sleep apnea, abnormal decrease to pain tolerance. Excessive or prolonged opioid use can internally affect many organs which in turn can suppress immunity. One of the main functional systems of the body affected by opioid use is the endocrine function. If this system is affected much like the domino effect, many other bodily functions will be triggered. These functions include reduced sexual function as a result of libido reduction, infertility, mood disorders, respiratory depression, osteoporosis and possibly osteopenia. If these functions are affected, the recovery process will be more difficult as it will require constant patient care through the use of more medications, tests and scans.

== Application ==
The Clinical Opioid Withdrawal Scale, more commonly known as COWS, is a method used to measure opioid withdrawal symptoms for both inpatients and outpatients. This intricate scaling system allows the analysis of patient condition. Each question in this test provides the opportunity for the practitioner to identify the severity and the type of opioid withdrawal symptoms being experienced by the patient. As shown in table 1 below these are the examinable topics which are generally rated a number between 0 and 4 depending on the patient's current condition. In some COWS, a rating of 5 can also be given (shown in the table 1 below). The annotated table lists the signs and symptoms that are being monitored at score 0 and 4. However, it is important to consider that the numbers 1,2 and 3 are also awarded depending on the type and severity of signs and symptoms being experienced by the patient.

Table 1: COWS made simple

Resting Pulse rate This is the first symptom that is tested once the patient has been sitting down or lying down for at least a minute. The normal range would be below 80-bpm if not less than that (depending on their age and weight) in which case would be scored 0. A pulse that exceeds the 120-bpm mark is given a score of 4.	Gastrointestinal upset This is also a fundamental part of the assessment as this is the body's way to tell you something is wrong and is rated based on the last half an hour. If they feel no symptoms of nausea or gastrointestinal irritation, they get a score of 0. Moreover, if they experience consistent episodes of nonstop vomiting or diarrhea, they will be given a score of 5.
Sweating The rate of patient sweat is scored based on the last half an hour with disregard to any physical fitness activity or a rise in room temperature. Similarly, to the previous topic, 0 is scored if patient's body temperature is within the normal range of ~37 °C and if they are showing any signs of uncontrollable chills or sweat streaming down their face and body, a score of 4 is given.	Tremor This refers to the unusual movements of the body. If patient is in stable condition with no odd movements then they are given a score of 0 but if they are experiencing tremor and muscle twitches throughout examination, they get a score of 4.
Restlessness This part of the scale is examined throughout the duration of the assessment. If the patient can remain calm and sit still through the test, they will be given a score of 0. However, if they are quite agitated, restless and cannot sit still throughout the examination, they will be given a score of 5.	Yawning This is an easy part of the assessment but requires focus to detail as this symptom should be monitored throughout the test. No yawning is an indication of a score of 0, whereas a score of 4 specifies the patient has constantly been yawning throughout the process of the test.
Pupil Size This is a crucial feature to notice as the dilation size of the pupil can provide a sufficient amount of information. If the pupil is at a normal size, then they will be given a score of 0. If their pupils are dilated all the way and the iris is barely visible, a score of 5 will be given as this indicates that the ciliary muscle of the eye is temporarily paralysed and therefore the pupils cannot constrict as a result of misuse or overuse of addictive medications.	Anxiety or Irritability This section is fairly similar to the restlessness section however the main difference to consider is if the patient cannot participate in the test because it is difficult for them to focus or sit still because they are irritated or anxious a score of 4/5? will be given. If the opposite occurs and they don't have any symptom, they get a score of 0.
Bone or Joint Aches This section does not take into account any previous medical condition such as osteoporosis or osteoarthritis, it only examines any recent or new joint pains and aches that have occurred. If there are no signs of pain, 0 is given. If they are unable to sit in a still position due to pain discomfort or if they are holding on to area of pain a score of 4 will be given.	Gooseflesh Skin This takes into account the texture of the skin. The condition and texture need to be examined as it can identify if they are cold, in shock or if they are frightened. If they have smooth skin, they are given 0. If they have very defined and visible piloerection skin due involuntary muscle contraction near the patient's hair follicles, they will be given a score of 5.
Runny Nose or Tearing Much like the yawning section, this is also a fairly straightforward part to examine. Previous medical history of allergies or cold and flu symptoms are disregarded. If there are no signs or symptoms, 0 is given. If they are continuously sniffing or have an aggressive runny nose and runny eyes, 4 is given.	Total All of the scores given will then be added up and a total score is given. The practitioner's initials are noted, and a final diagnosis will be made. If patient signs and symptoms tally up to 0 (rare case) they need to go under further examinations is they are unwell as it could be as a result of another condition. However, if they receive results over 36, they need to go under immediate care and treatment as this is as a result of severe opioid withdrawal. Any total score in between 0 and 36 is categorised into three groups (5–12, 13–24 and 25–36) and based on which category the patient falls under, the severity of condition is diagnosed (mild, moderate and moderately severe).

This table was summarised and annotated based on the scale provided in the Clinical Opiate Withdrawal Scale pdf from the National Institute on Drug Abuse – Advancing Addiction Science.

== Post diagnosis ==
After being diagnosed with opioid withdrawal syndrome through the use of the scale, immediate medical attention is required. One of the most common first line of treatments administered is Buprenorphine. There are three factors that need to be taken into consideration whilst treating the patient with this multi-use drug:

1. Induction
2. Stabilisation
3. Maintenance

These three factors are crucial in ensuring full and safe patient recovery. This opioid agonist will decrease toxicity during overdose as it acts as an antagonist for the opioid receptors in the body which then inhibits the adverse effects of opioid use. This will then allow the patient to become stabilised which then allows the practitioner to maintain and monitor the patient's stable condition.
