= Opioid withdrawal =

Withdrawal symptoms of opioids

- Specialty: Toxicology, Addiction medicine, Psychiatry
- Symptoms: Flu-like symptoms, depression, anxiety, nausea and vomiting, muscle aches, sweating, diarrhea, fever, restless legs, rapid heartbeat
- Causes: Stopping or reducing intake of opioids in a state of dependence
- Prevention: Gradual dose reduction
- Medication: Symptomatic: Clonidine, lofexidine Preventative: Buprenorphine, methadone

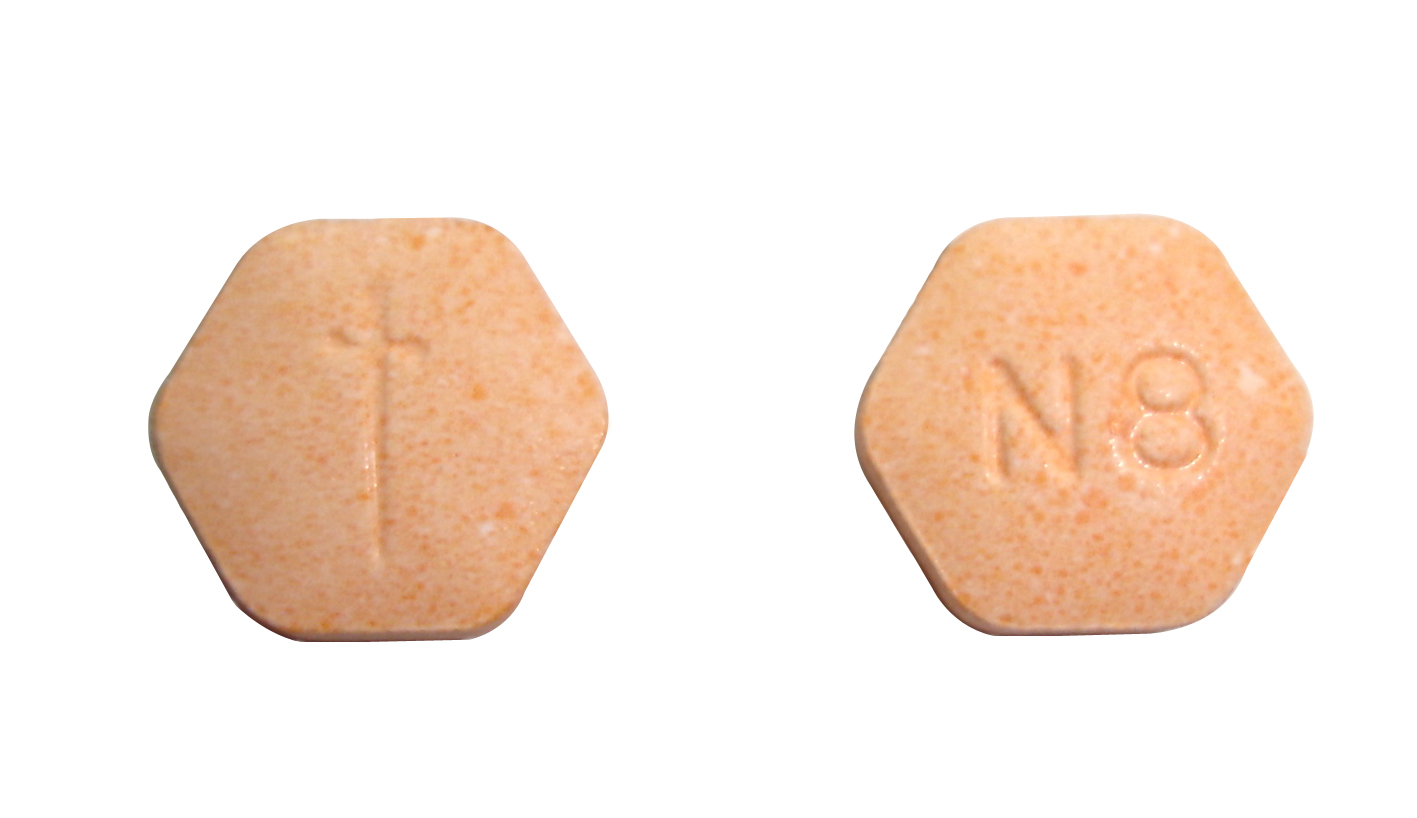
Suboxone tablet (Buprenorphine/naloxone) delivers the opioid drug through a sublingual route, giving fast onset of effects.

Opioid withdrawal is a set of symptoms arising from the sudden cessation or reduction of opioids where previous usage has been heavy and prolonged. Signs and symptoms of withdrawal can include drug craving, anxiety, restless legs syndrome, nausea, vomiting, diarrhea, sweating, and an elevated heart rate. Opioid use triggers a rapid adaptation in cellular signaling pathways that, when reduced or stopped, can cause adverse physiological effects. All opioids, both recreational drugs and medications, when reduced or stopped, can lead to opioid withdrawal symptoms. When withdrawal symptoms are due to recreational opioid use, the term opioid use disorder is used, whereas when due to prescribed medications, the term prescription opioid use disorder is used. Opioid withdrawal can be managed by the use of opioid replacement therapy, while symptoms may be relieved by the use of medications such as lofexidine and clonidine.

== Signs and symptoms ==
Withdrawal from any opioid produces similar signs and symptoms. However, the severity and duration of withdrawal depend on the type and dose of opioid taken and the duration and frequency of use.

The symptoms of opioid withdrawal may develop within minutes or up to several days following reduction or stopping. Symptoms can include: extreme anxiety, nausea or vomiting, muscle aches, runny nose, sneezing, diarrhea, sweating, and fever.

The withdrawal from various opioid medications, including morphine, causes similar effects, most of which is caused by stimulation and overstimulation of the central nervous system. The effects of morphine withdrawal can range from gastrointestinal disturbances to symptoms like tremors (most commonly in hands), opioid cravings, anxiety, and insomnia. While morphine withdrawal is not fatal, patients in withdrawal may experience mental symptoms that become difficult to manage.

Due to the difference in lipophilicity and mode of release between different opioids, the severity and duration of withdrawal symptoms may differ. The followings are the general descriptions of duration of opioid withdrawal symptoms:

=== Short-term withdrawal symptoms ===
The onset of withdrawal symptoms varies with the duration of action of the medication. For instant-release morphine (shorter duration of action), withdrawal symptoms begin 8 to 24 hours after the last dose and persist for 4 to 10 days. For extended-release morphine (longer duration of action), withdrawal symptoms begin 12 to 48 hours after the last dose and persist for 10 to 20 days.

- Initial symptoms include: an agitated state, feeling anxious, muscle aches, increased tears, insomnia, runny nose, excessive sweating, and yawning.
- Late symptoms include: abdominal cramps, diarrhea, pupil dilation, goosebumps, nausea, vomiting.

Short-acting or instant-release opioids result in more rapid onset and shorter duration of withdrawal symptoms.

=== Long-term withdrawal symptoms ===
Withdrawal from opioids such as morphine also leads to an extended withdrawal phase. It persists for up to half a year, and is categorised by a strong craving for opioids and a decline in well-being. High intake for a long duration (> 6 months) is associated with a more severe level of withdrawal symptoms. Longer-acting opioids result in slower onset but longer duration of withdrawal symptoms.

== Pathophysiology ==
Opioid withdrawal is chemically caused by multiple factors. Repeated dosages of opioids can quickly lead to tolerance and physical dependence. This is due to the marked decrease in opioid receptor sensitivity caused by long-term receptor stimulation triggering receptor desensitisation (in this case receptor internalisation). Tolerance causes a decrease in opioid sensitivity, impairing the efficacy of endogenous (our own body's) opioid molecules that function in multiple brain regions. Additionally, the dopaminergic pathway and neuron adaptations have been shown to serve as two possible mechanisms which lead to the development of morphine dependence and withdrawal symptoms.

=== Cyclic adenosine monophosphate ===
Opioids partially signal through the decrease in cellular cAMP. Cells with decreased cAMP adapt to regulate cAMP and increase production. In the tolerant brain the sudden withdrawal of opioids coupled with the reduced sensitivity to inhibitory signals from the endogenous opioid systems can cause abnormally high levels of cAMP that may be responsible for withdrawal behaviours. Similar changes may also be responsible for the peripheral gastrointestinal effects such as diarrhea, as there is a reversal of the effect on gastrointestinal motility.

=== Dopaminergic pathway ===
An illustration showing the mesocortical and mesolimbic pathway (in blue)

Addiction to opioids such as morphine occur due to the changes in the dopaminergic signalling of the mesocorticolimbic system as a result of chronic opioid use. Changes to the dopaminergic signalling gives rise to drug craving behavior.

Changes to the dopaminergic signalling leads to signs and symptoms of morphine withdrawal when amount of morphine is reduced or discontinued. The impairment of the dopaminergic signalling also leads to a decrease in dopamine (a neurotransmitter used to transmit signals across nerve cells in the central nervous system) in the mesocorticolimbic system, otherwise known as the reward system, which is suggested to have a critical role in morphine withdrawal. It can lead to morphine sensitization, or tolerance, such that more morphine is needed to achieve the same pharmacological effect.

=== Neuron adaptation ===
Addiction to morphine may also arise due to various adaptations of the neurons, including the desensitization of the μ-opioid receptor (MOR), the impairment of the cell communication of MOR, the changes in brain systems that interact with neurons sensitive to μ-opioid receptors, and the activation of supporting cells in the brain known as glial cells.

In the sudden discontinuation or reduced dose of opioids, physiological responses occur in response to the decreased occupancy of the μ-opioid receptor, thus producing signs and symptoms of morphine withdrawal.

== Diagnosis ==
The diagnosis of opioid withdrawal requires recent use or exposure to opioids and symptoms consistent with the disorder. The severity of symptoms can be assessed by validated withdrawal scales, such as the Clinical Opiate Withdrawal Scale (COWS).

There is no test to diagnose for morphine withdrawal. However, a toxicology test using urine is conducted to determine if withdrawal symptoms are caused by other non-opioid drugs or a combination of both. In addition, heart tests such as an electrocardiography (ECG), or blood tests such as complete blood count (CBC) are also conducted.

== Treatment ==
Treatment for opioid withdrawal is based on underlying diagnostic features. A person with an acute opioid withdrawal but no underlying opioid use disorder can be managed by slowly reducing opioids and treatments aimed at the symptoms.

=== Monitoring and management ===
Monitoring of patients' symptoms and complications from morphine withdrawal should be done 3 to 4 times a day. Monitoring and subsequent management can be determined via the Short Opiate Withdrawal Scale or the Clinical Opioid Withdrawal Scale.

The scores obtained from the scales vary based on the current symptoms a person with morphine withdrawal is suffering from, where different severities of withdrawal are identified based on these scores along with the respective treatment strategies. For the Short Opiate Withdrawal Scale, a score of 0–10 indicates mild withdrawal, while 10–20 indicates moderate withdrawal, and 20–30 indicates severe withdrawal. Patients with mild withdrawal are given medications based on symptoms experienced. Patients with moderate withdrawal are given medications for symptomatic relief or medications against opioid dependence like opioid agonists (buprenorphine, methadone) and clonidine. Patients with severe withdrawal are given medication against opioid dependence. Apart from the methods above, patients may also choose to simply stop the opioid "cold turkey".

=== Acute withdrawal ===
==== Alpha-2 adrenergic receptor agonists ====
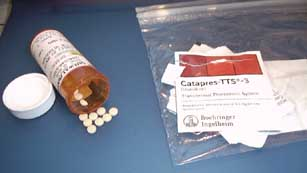
A picture of clonidine patches and pills

A major feature of opioid withdrawal is exacerbated norepinephrine (noradrenaline) release in the locus coeruleus. Alpha-2 adrenergic receptor agonists can be used to manage the symptoms of acute withdrawal. Lofexidine and clonidine are used for this purpose; both are considered to be equally effective, though clonidine has more side effects than lofexidine.

Clonidine is an alpha-2 adrenergic agonist primarily used in the treatment of hypertension. Additionally, it has several off-label uses (use of a drug for purpose different than what it is approved for), one being the management of symptoms due to opioid withdrawal. While it can alleviate symptoms mentioned above, it can also lead to drowsiness and low blood pressure. Clonidine is only prescribed if the patient has a measured heart rate greater than 50bpm or a blood pressure greater than 90/50mmHg, and does not show a drop in blood pressure after initial administration of clonidine.

==== GABA analogues ====
While some studies indicate that gabapentin does not significantly reduce the symptoms of opioid withdrawal, there is increasing evidence that gabapentinoids are effective in controlling some of the symptoms during opioid detoxification. Pregabalin, another GABA analogue, was more effective than clonidine in reducing opioid withdrawal symptoms.

=== Withdrawal in opioid use disorder ===
The treatment of withdrawal in people with opioid use disorder also relies on symptomatic management and tapering with medications that replace typical opioids, including buprenorphine and methadone. The principle of managing the syndrome is to allow the concentration of drugs in blood to fall to near zero and reverse physiological adaptation. This allows the body to adapt to the absence of drugs to reduce the withdrawal symptoms. The most commonly used strategy is to offer opioid drug users long-acting opioid drugs and slowly taper the dose of the drug. Methadone, buprenorphine/naloxone, and naltrexone are all commonly used medications for opioid use disorder.

A review of UK hospital policies found that local guidelines delayed access to substitute opioids. For instance, requiring lab tests to demonstrate recent use or input from specialist drug teams before prescribing. A lack of access to these substitutes may increase the risk of people discharging themselves early against medical advice.

Buprenorphine patches can deliver the opioid drug via a transdermal route, with long-lasting effects.

==== Buprenorphine and methadone ====
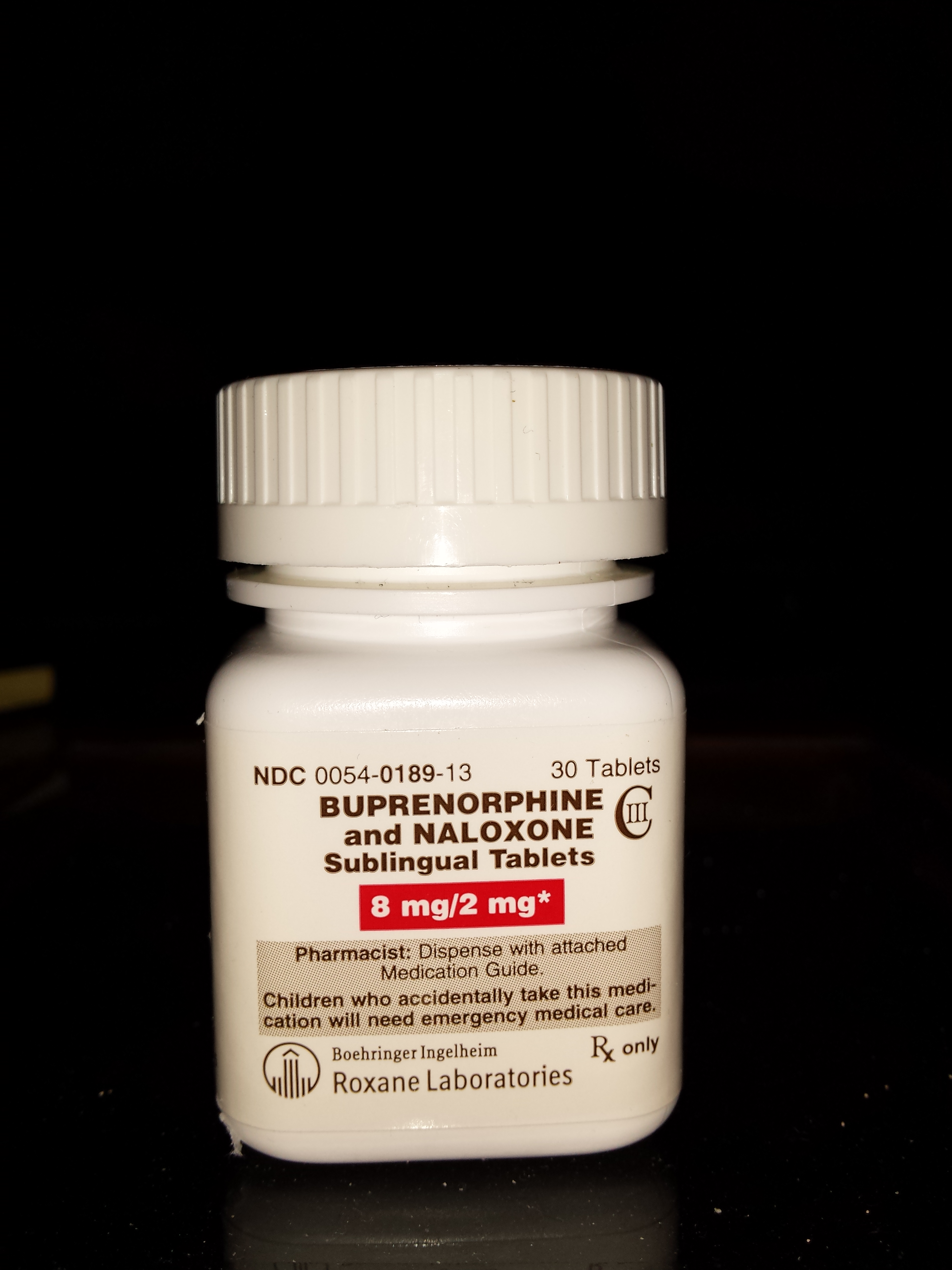
A bottle of tablets containing Buprenorphine and Naloxone, used to treat symptoms arising from morphine withdrawal

Buprenorphine is an FDA-approved medication that can be prescribed in clinics to treat opioid dependence. It is a partial agonist to opioid receptors. It is used as a low-potency substitute (comparatively weak) to treat dependency to more-potent opioids such as morphine and heroin, and functions by alleviating withdrawal symptoms and cravings to opioids. Naloxone, a drug that blocks the opioid receptors, may be added to the medication regimen to avoid misuse of buprenorphine. Under the Mainstreaming Addiction Treatment (MAT) Act, buprenorphine is prescribed in events of opioid misuse.

Methadone is an opioid agonist also used to treat opioid dependence. Similar to buprenorphine, methadone reduces cravings to opioids and symptoms of withdrawals. It also has detoxifying effects against morphine. However, as it is a full agonist and not a partial agonist like buprenorphine, it has more addictive properties. It is considered an effective treatment to opioid dependency when used under medical supervision. Methadone is also included in the WHO's list of essential medicines.

Buprenorphine should be used with caution if the patient has diabetes, respiratory problems, or urethral obstruction, while methadone should be used in caution if the patient has problems such as respiratory problems and severe hepatic impairment. Furthermore, the dose and frequency of dosage of both buprenorphine and methadone should be altered based on symptomatic control and degree of opioid use.

=== Psychosocial therapy ===
In addition to drug therapy, psychosocial intervention is also used to reduce the relapse of morphine addiction. Some interventions are given below based on the severity of morphine dependence.

==== For patients with lower severity of opioid dependency ====
- Education on Drugs: Allow the patient to understand how the drug affects the brain to learn to manage the craving.
- Refusing Drugs: Educate the patient to refuse drugs, as they may come across the opportunity again.
- Acceptance and relaxation training: Train the patient to understand how to cope with negative feelings to prevent them from resorting to drugs.
- Planning: Teach the patient to have a plan when leaving a closed setting to reduce the risk of relapse.
- Contingency Management: using positive reinforcement to encourage drug-free behaviors.

==== For patients with greater severity of dependence (in addition to the four interventions above) ====
- Finding motivations to reduce drug use: Guide the patient to find a reason for them to reduce or stop drug use.
- Cognitive behavioral therapy: Allow the patient to understand negative, unreasonable thoughts and guide them to replace them with realistic thoughts.
- Problem solving skills: Allow the patient to understand that drugs are not a solution to problems that arise.
- Craving management: Teach the patient how to manage cravings when they experience it.

=== Dangerous or ineffective treatments ===
The expense of opioid replacement treatments in some countries has led some people to try treatments with limited evidence. At high doses, loperamide has been reported by some drug users to alleviate opioid withdrawal syndrome. The doses reported in the literature are associated with a high risk of damage to the heart.

== Neonatal opioid withdrawal ==
Many thousands of newborns each year are affected by being exposed to opioids during their prenatal development. Maternal use of opioids has become prolific.

The use of opioids during pregnancy creates a dependency in the newborn who experiences withdrawal symptoms shown in clinical signs of opioid withdrawal. These signs are grouped as the neonatal opioid withdrawal syndrome, also known more broadly as neonatal abstinence syndrome. The central nervous system (CNS), and the autonomic nervous system (ANS) are affected. Common signs associated with the CNS are high-pitched crying, reduced sleep, tremors, seizures, gastrointestinal dysfunction, and vomiting. Common ANS-associated signs include sweating, hyperthermia, yawning, sneezing, faster breathing rate, and nasal congestion.

== See also ==
- Opioid-induced hyperalgesia
