= C20H23N =

The molecular formula C_{20}H_{23}N (molar mass: 277.40 g/mol, exact mass: 277.1830 u) may refer to:

- Amitriptyline
- 2-Ethylidene-1,5-dimethyl-3,3-diphenylpyrrolidine (EDDP)
- Litracen
- Maprotiline
