= EDDP =

EDDP may refer to:

- EDDP, the International Civil Aviation Organization airport code for Leipzig/Halle Airport
- 2-Ethylidene-1,5-dimethyl-3,3-diphenylpyrrolidine, a metabolite of methadone
- Edifenphos (O-ethyl-S,S-diphenyldithiophosphate), a pesticide
