= Opioid-induced hyperalgesia =

Pain caused by opioid addiction

Opioid-induced hyperalgesia (OIH), also known as opioid-induced abnormal pain sensitivity or paradoxical hyperalgesia, is an uncommon condition of generalized pain caused by the long-term use of high dosages of opioids such as morphine, oxycodone, and methadone. OIH is not necessarily confined to the original affected site. This means that if the person was originally taking opioids due to lower back pain, when OIH appears, the person may experience pain in the entire body, instead of just in the lower back. Over time, individuals taking opioids can also develop an increasing sensitivity to noxious stimuli, even evolving a painful response to previously non-noxious stimuli (allodynia). This means that if the person originally felt pain from twisting or from sitting too long, the person might now additionally experience pain from a light touch or from raindrops falling on the skin.

OIH differs from drug tolerance, although it can be difficult to tell the two conditions apart. OIH can often be treated by gradually tapering the opioid dose and replacing opioid-based pain care with other pain management medications and techniques or by opioid rotation. In a 2012 study, 39 patients had abdominal pain and OIH. They underwent detoxification and almost all of those patients "were able to stop using narcotics and have significant improvement in pain."

== Differentiation from tolerance ==
Tolerance, another condition that can arise from prolonged exposure to opioids, can often be mistaken for opioid-induced hyperalgesia and vice versa, as the clinical presentation can appear similar. Although tolerance and opioid-induced hyperalgesia both result in a similar need for dose escalation to receive the same level of effect to treat pain, they are nevertheless caused by two distinct mechanisms. The similar net effect makes the two phenomena difficult to distinguish in a clinical setting. Under chronic opioid treatment, a particular individual's requirement for dose escalation may be due to tolerance, opioid-induced hyperalgesia, or a combination of both. In tolerance, there is a lower sensitivity to opioids, theorized to occur via two major mechanisms: decreased receptor activation (desensitization of antinociceptive mechanisms) and opioid receptor down-regulation (internalization of membrane receptors). In opioid-induced hyperalgesia, sensitization of pronociceptive mechanisms occurs, resulting in a decrease in the pain threshold, or allodynia. In addition, what appears to be opioid tolerance can be caused by opioid-induced hyperalgesia lowering the baseline pain level, thus masking the drug's analgesic effects. Identifying the development of hyperalgesia is of great clinical importance since patients receiving opioids to relieve pain may paradoxically experience more pain as a result of treatment. Whereas increasing the dose of opioid can be an effective way to overcome tolerance, doing so to compensate for opioid-induced hyperalgesia may worsen the patient's condition by increasing sensitivity to pain while escalating physical dependence.

This "uncommon but important phenomenon [can be] seen with high-dose opioid therapy." However, the conclusion of a report published in the Journal of Pain and Palliative Care Pharmacotherapy suggests that "[h]yperalgesia shares a common mechanism with tolerance and it may be that hyperalgesia is a manifestation of tolerance itself."

== Pharmacology ==
The pharmacology of opioids involves the substance binding to opioid receptors in the nervous system and other tissues. The three known and defined opioid receptors are mu, kappa and delta, with many other receptors reported as well. These receptors are notable for binding opioids and eliciting an analgesic response, thus alleviating the sensation of pain. The mu opioid receptor is targeted most often by opioids to relieve pain. Two of the most commonly used opioid antagonists at the mu receptor are naltrexone and naloxone. The pharmacology for opioid-induced hyperalgesia is more complicated, and is believed to involve the activation of NMDA receptors and increased excitatory peptide neurotransmitters (such as cholecystokinin).

== Pharmacogenomics ==
There is increasing evidence in support of genetics being a key factor in the development of OIH through its influence on both pain sensitivity and analgesic control. Current evidence indicates that the genetic influence stems from polymorphisms of the gene coding for the enzyme, catechol-O-methyltransferase (COMT). Its enzymatic activity varies depending on its three possible genotypes, which are seen as a single amino acid change from valine to methionine, resulting in significant variability in its activity. Degradation of the neurotransmitters, dopamine and noradrenaline, is approximately 4-fold greater when the amino acid presented is valine instead of methionine. This results in modulation of the dopaminergic and noradrenergic response at the synaptic level of neurons, which has been linked to having effects on memory function, anxiety, and pain sensitivity in comparison to individuals presenting as homozygous for valine alleles of this particular gene (COMTval158).

A number of opioids undergo metabolism by cytochrome P450 enzymes in order to generate active metabolites. Only by generating these active metabolites can analgesic effects occur. The enzyme CYP2D6 is used to metabolize several opioids including codeine, methadone, hydrocodone, and tramadol. The level of expression of CYP2D6 can vary dramatically between different individuals. Individuals with low expression of CYP2D6 are designated as poor metabolizers while individuals with high expression of CYP2D6 are designated as fast metabolizers. This information is important for healthcare professionals to know as it determines the dose of opioids a patient will need in order to achieve the desired analgesic effect. If given the same starting dose of codeine, an ultra-rapid metabolizer will feel more pain relief due to the high expression of CYP2D6, resulting in more codeine being turned into morphine. Poor metabolizers may feel an initial short reduction in pain followed by a quick return to baseline. Patients who are poor metabolizers should be given minimal amounts of opioids such as tramadol and codeine as they do not possess the necessary enzymes to turn it into its active metabolite desmetramadol. Information regarding a patient's CYP2D6 expression can be found by running a genomic test such as 23andMe. This information is also helpful to healthcare professionals so they may modify the dosing of other drugs that may have drug-drug interactions with opioids such as rifampin.

== Mechanism of action ==
The sensitization of pronociceptive pathways in response to opioid treatment appears to involve several pathways. Research thus far has primarily implicated the μ-opioid receptors (MOR) abnormal activation of NMDA receptors in the central nervous system, and long-term potentiation of synapses between nociceptive C fibers and neurons in the spinal dorsal horn.

=== μ-opioid receptors ===
In clinical trials, the MOR is the main target of opioid ligand binding. While binding of the opioid to the MOR typically causes analgesia, there can be instances where hyperalgesia occurs. It has been speculated that the opposite analgesic and hyperanalgesic effects are due to different isoforms of the receptor. The MOR is a G protein-coupled receptor with seven transmembrane domains. Variants of the receptor have been discovered and are due to alternative splicing mechanisms. A particular receptor variant, 6TM MOR, has been heavily studied because of its role in nociception. The 6TM MOR is missing residues in the N-terminal region which has implications for the extracellular tail and first transmembrane domain. This causes an excitatory effect compared to the inhibition in the normal seven transmembrane domain receptor because of differences in G-protein activation. Studies on mice have shown silencing of the 6TM MOR variant decreased morphine-induced hyperalgesia which suggested G-protein coupling in the 6TM isoform could be a factor in the development of OIH.

=== NMDA Receptors ===
OIH shares commonalities with chronic pain in their neural mechanisms and specifically their usage of the glutaminergic system and NMDA glutamate receptors. NMDA receptors can be found presynaptically on central terminals of primary afferent neurons and postsynaptically on spinal dorsal horn neurons. it has been shown experimentally that introduction of an NMDA receptor antagonist to mice and rats greatly reduces or even prevents OIH.

B-arrestin 2 transcripts (Arrb2) are implicated in OIH because of their upregulation during analgesic tolerance in the periaqueductal gray, cortex and striatum. NMDA receptor antagonists combined with morphine in OIH conditions have been shown to reduce Arr2b in the entirety of the mouse's brain. These findings implicate Arr2b activity as a factor in OIH.

=== Long-Term Potentiation ===
Long-Term Potentiation (LTP) is the increase in sensitivity of homosynapses that augment the synapse's strength and signal transduction. In the context of OIH, LTP has been shown to contribute to hyperalgesia by hypersensitizing areas of nociceptive processing, particularly at synapses between C fibers and the spinal cord dorsal horn. Studies that attempted to link LTP and hyperalgesia have found that drugs able to block LTP (ketamine and minocycline) also decrease hyperalgesia. In addition, LTP and OIH both utilize NMDA receptors and their activity can be reduced by NMDA receptor antagonists (i.e. ketamine).

== Management ==
Treatment of opioid tolerance and opioid-Induced hyperalgesia differs but it may be difficult to differentiate these two conditions in a clinical setting where most pain assessments are done through simple scale scores. The treatment for OIH may be challenging because of the lack of adequate quality studies published, which is possibly due to the complexity in diagnosis of OIH and challenges in working with patients on chronic opioids. Currently there is no single best pharmacologic treatment for OIH.

One general treatment option is to gradually reduce or discontinue the dose of opioid to see if OIH is improved, although this could induce withdrawal symptoms that may initially increase pain.

Opioid switching, also called opioid rotation, is the replacement of the current opioid with another pharmacological agent such as morphine or methadone. It was effective in some studies, but can increase sensitivity to pain, requiring higher doses of the opioid-sparing drug. Opioid rotation is a safe and effective alternative to completely stopping opioid therapy. Methadone is also believed to show some efficacy in OIH, presumably due to its weak NMDA antagonist activity.

Ketamine, an NMDA antagonist, has been shown to prevent the extended use of opioid in post-operative hyperalgesia when it is infused in a small amount perioperatively along with the opioid but there are also studies that show ketamine being ineffective in modulating hyperalgesia.

The use of an NSAID, especially some COX-2 inhibitors, or acetaminophen either as monotherapy or combination therapy is also suggested as a possible treatment option.

== Research needs ==
It can be difficult to apply research into OIH to average patients, because some research focused on people taking very high doses or in methadone rehabilitation programs.

Opioid-induced hyperalgesia has also been criticized as overdiagnosed among chronic pain patients, due to poor differential practice in distinguishing it from the much more common phenomenon of opioid tolerance. The misdiagnosis of common opioid tolerance (OT) as opioid-induced hyperalgesia (OIH) can be problematic as the clinical actions suggested by each condition can be contrary to each other. Patients misdiagnosed with OIH may have their opioid dose mistakenly decreased (in the attempt to counter OIH) at times when it is actually appropriate for their dose to be increased or rotated (as a counter to opioid tolerance).

a_{2} agonists, such as clonidine and dexmedetomidine, have been studied as alternatives or adjuncts to opioids for their analgesic properties in the perioperative setting. They have been shown to decrease the need for opioids after surgery, which may reduce the risk of hyperalgesic effects associated with prolonged opioid use. However, there is currently insufficient data to support the clinical effectiveness of a_{2} agonists in reducing postoperative OIH.

Palmitoylethanolamide (PEA) has been studied for its anti-inflammatory and analgesic effects and emerging data suggests that it may have a role in delaying the onset of opioid tolerance and reducing the development of OIH when used in conjunction with opioids.

== See also ==
- Hyperkatifeia
