= Opioid rotation =

Opioid rotation or opioid switching is the process of changing one opioid to another to improve pain control or reduce unwanted side effects. This technique was introduced in the 1990s to help manage severe chronic pain and improve the opioid response in cancer patients and non-cancer patients. In order to obtain adequate levels of pain relief, patients requiring chronic opioid therapy may require an increase in the original prescribed dose for a number of reasons, including increased pain or a worsening disease state. Over the course of long-term treatment, an increase in dosage cannot be continued indefinitely as unwanted side effects of treatment often become intolerable once a certain dose is reached, even though the pain may still not be properly managed. One strategy used to address this is to switch the patient between different opioid drugs over time, usually every few months. Opioid rotation requires strict monitoring in patients with ongoing levels of high opioid doses for extended periods of time, since long term opioid use can lead to a patient developing tolerance to the analgesic effects of the drug. Patients may also not respond to the first opioid prescribed to them at all, therefore needing to try another opioid to help manage their pain. A patient's specific response and sensitivity to opioids include many factors that include physiology, genetics and pharmacodynamic parameters, which together determine the amount of pain control and tolerance of a particular opioid.

== Mechanism ==
Opioid analgesic drugs tend to exhibit incomplete cross-tolerance, so that even when a patient has developed a high level of tolerance to one drug from this class, they may find that a different opioid drug will still be effective. The reasons for this are still not completely understood, but are thought to result from variations in opioid receptor affinity and occupancy levels at equianalgesic doses, as well as additional mechanisms of action possessed by some drugs such as the NMDA antagonist action of methadone or levorphanol, or the SNRI activity of tramadol or tapentadol.

== Indications ==
There are no clinical guidelines outlining the use and implementation of opioid rotation. However, this strategy is commonly used for these various situations: pain not controlled by current opioid, pain controlled but in the presence of intolerable adverse events, pain not controlled despite rapid increase in opioid dose, switching to utilize different alternative routes of administration, or switching due to high cost of current opioid (or other patient-specific cost considerations).

== Potential issues ==
While there is good evidence for the efficacy of opioid rotation as a treatment approach in general, there is less evidence for what particular opioid analgesics are most suitable, and in practice the choice of opioid drugs used depends on many factors such as patient characteristics, prescriber preferences and safety. One issue with opioid rotation is that an opioid therapy failure poorly predicts whether other opioids would be effective. In certain situations, multiple switches may be required before pain therapy is optimized. In addition, recent studies explore which opioid drugs are most effective in implementing in an opioid rotation, but have so far found no difference in efficacy between opioid drugs like methadone and fentanyl in cancer patients.

Diversion of prescribed opioid drugs for illicit recreational use is also a particular concern in this field, as the drugs which are most effective for relieving suffering in palliative care also tend to be those most sought after by drug abusers. The choice of what opioid drug to use in which patient thus tends to be a balance between many different factors that must be considered, and the need for opioid rotation in chronic pain patients makes it advantageous for a wide range of different opioid drugs to be available, even though they may be broadly equivalent in action when used in shorter term treatment. Additionally, newer studies may explore which patient populations can benefit the most from opioid rotation and which populations can have their pain managed by other means.

== See also ==
- Opioid-induced hyperalgesia
