= Gustav Ehrhart =

German chemist (1894–1971)

- Born: 21 December 1894; Ludwigshafen, Germany
- Died: 11 December 1971 (aged 76); Mainz, West Germany
- Citizenship: German
- Education: University of Heidelberg
- Known for: Synthesis of methadone (with Max Bockmühl)
- Scientific career
- Fields: Chemistry, Organic chemistry
- Workplaces: Hoechst AG

Gustav Ehrhart (21 December 1894 – 11 December 1971) was a German chemist. He synthesized the first fully synthetic opioid analgesic, methadone, together with Max Bockmühl.

== Education and professional positions ==
Ehrhart studied chemistry at the University of Heidelberg, with a focus on organic chemistry. His studies were interrupted by the First World War. He served as an artillery officer. After the war he resumed his studies and was awarded a doctorate degree in 1922. One of his professors was Theodor Curtius. Ehrhart received the Victor-Meyer Award for his dissertation. In 1923 he started working for Hoechst AG. Two years later he became the deputy of Max Bockmühl, the head of the pharmaceutical research laboratories of the company. In 1949, after the Second World War, Erhardt succeeded Bockmühl as the head of the entire pharmaceutical research division of Hoechst AG. In 1951 he became a deputy member of the Board, and two years later a regular member of Hoechst AG's Board of Directors. During his time on the Board of Hoechst AG and after his retirement in 1961 Ehrhart maintained a laboratory which he personally supervised.

== Honors ==
Ehrhart was awarded honorary doctorate degrees by the universities of Graz, Mainz, Frankfurt, Stuttgart, and Gießen. In 1952 Ehrhart was awarded the Adolf von Baeyer Medal, and in 1970 he was awarded the Grand Merit Cross of the Federal Republic of Germany.

== Products synthesized ==
Ehrhart's main focus was the development of new analgesics (painkillers). His most notable contribution is the development of methadone, which he synthesized together with his boss Bockmühl in 1939.

In the winter of 1937-38, Erhart and Bockmühl began the synthesis of over 300 compounds which contained diphenylmethane as a central structural element. In late 1939 they gave the compound (±)-6-dimethylamino-4, 4-diphenylheptan-3-one the development code VA 10820. In the first animal experiments, Ehrhart and Bockmühl found that VA 10820 had a five- to ten-fold stronger analgesic effect than pethidine. In mid-1941, VA 10820 was given the generic name Amidon. Bockmühl and Ehrhart filed a patent on 11 September 1938 for the whole substance class. Due to the turmoil of the Second World War, Amidon was not clinically tested any further. Due to the expropriation of IG Farben's patents and recipes, VA 10820 came to the United States, where it was given the international nonproprietary name methadone in 1949. In the same year Eli Lilly marketed it under the brand name Dolophine. In January 1949 Hoechst AG, which had re-formed after the dissolution of IG Farben with Ehrhart as its research director, marketed methadone as a strong painkiller under the brand name Polamidone.

== Selected publications ==
- H. Alpermann, G. Ehrhart: Arzneimittel: Entwicklung, Wirkung, Darstellung (Drug: Development, Action, Representation). Volume 1, Verlag Chemie, 1973, ISBN 3-527-25375-0
- E. Bäumler, G. Ehrhart, V. Muthesius: Ein Jahrhundert Chemie (A century of Chemistry). Econ Verlag, 1900063.
