= Hyperkatifeia =

Emotional hypersensitivity in opioid abuse

Hyperkatifeia is defined as hypersensitivity to emotional distress in the context of opioid abuse.

Hyperkatifeia and opioid-induced hyperalgesia can be seen with long-term use of illicit street opioids e.g. heroin, and prescription opioids e.g. hydrocodone and oxycodone during withdrawal.
