= Max Bockmühl =

German chemist and inventor (1882–1949)

- Born: 2 September 1882; Barmen, Rhine Province, Prussia, Germany
- Died: 5 January 1949 (aged 66); Bad Soden am Taunus, Main-Taunus-Kreis, Hessen, Germany
- Occupations: Inventor, chemist

Max Bockmühl (2 September 1882 – 5 January 1949) was a German inventor and chemist.

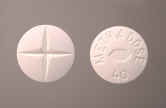
40mg of Methadone

== Life ==
Bockmühl studied chemistry and pharmacy. He worked as chemist in Germany. Together with Gustav Ehrhart working for I.G. Farbenindustrie AG at the Farbwerke Hoechst, the pair developed Methadone in Germany, 1937, a drug synthesised from 1,1-diphenylbutane-2-sulfonic acid and dimethylamino-2-chloropropane, as they were looking for a synthetic opioid that could be created with readily available precursors, to solve Germany's opium shortage problem. Bockmühl was married.
