= Isomethadone =

Opioid analgesic and cough suppressant drug

Clinical data
- Other names: WIN-1783, BW 47-442
- ATC code: None

Legal status
- Legal status: AU: S9 (Prohibited substance); BR: Class A1 (Narcotic drugs); CA: Schedule I; DE: Anlage II (Authorized trade only, not prescriptible); US: Schedule II; UN: Psychotropic Schedule I

Identifiers
- IUPAC name: (±)-6-(Dimethylamino)-5-methyl-4,4-diphenyl-3-hexanone
- CAS Number: 466-40-0 5341-49-1 (HCl) 26594-41-2 ((R)-form) 561-10-4 ((S)-form) 7487-81-2 ((S)-form (HCl))
- PubChem CID: 10072
- ChemSpider: 9675
- UNII: 12L95QD6KV
- KEGG: D12676
- CompTox Dashboard (EPA): DTXSID40861955

Chemical and physical data
- Formula: C_{21}H_{27}NO
- Molar mass: 309.453 g·mol^{−1}
- 3D model (JSmol): Interactive image
- SMILES: O=C(CC)C(C1=CC=CC=C1)(C(C)CN(C)C)C2=CC=CC=C2
- InChI: InChI=1S/C21H27NO/c1-5-20(23)21(17(2)16-22(3)4,18-12-8-6-9-13-18)19-14-10-7-11-15-19/h6-15,17H,5,16H2,1-4H3; Key:IFKPLJWIEQBPGG-UHFFFAOYSA-N

Isomethadone (INN, BAN; trade name Liden; also known as isoamidone) is a synthetic opioid analgesic and antitussive related to methadone that was used formerly as a pharmaceutical drug but is now no longer marketed. Isomethadone was used as both an analgesic and antitussive. It binds to and activates both the μ- and δ-opioid receptors, with the (S)-isomer being the more potent of the two enantiomers. Isomethadone is a Schedule II controlled substance in the United States, with an ACSCN of 9226 and a 2014 aggregate manufacturing quota of 5 g. The salts in use are the hydrobromide (HBr, free base conversion ratio 0.793), hydrochloride (HCl, 0.894), and HCl monohydrate (0.850). Isomethadone is also regulated internationally as a Schedule I controlled substance under the United Nations Single Convention on Narcotic Drugs of 1961.

== See also ==
- Methadone
