= Esmethadone =

(S)-enantiomer of methadone

Clinical data
- Other names: Dextromethadone; d-Methadone; S-Methadone; (+)-Methadone

Identifiers
- IUPAC name: (6S)-6-(Dimethylamino)-4,4-diphenylheptan-3-one
- CAS Number: 5653-80-5
- PubChem CID: 643985
- ChemSpider: 559067
- UNII: S95RZH8AMH
- ChEBI: CHEBI:167308
- CompTox Dashboard (EPA): DTXSID501045751
- ECHA InfoCard: 100.164.915

Chemical and physical data
- Formula: C_{21}H_{27}NO
- Molar mass: 309.453 g·mol^{−1}
- 3D model (JSmol): Interactive image
- SMILES: CCC(=O)C(C[C@H](C)N(C)C)(C1=CC=CC=C1)C2=CC=CC=C2
- InChI: InChI=1S/C21H27NO/c1-5-20(23)21(16-17(2)22(3)4,18-12-8-6-9-13-18)19-14-10-7-11-15-19/h6-15,17H,5,16H2,1-4H3/t17-/m0/s1; Key:USSIQXCVUWKGNF-KRWDZBQOSA-N

Esmethadone (INN; developmental code name REL-1017), also known as dextromethadone, is the (S)-enantiomer of methadone. It acts as an N-methyl-D-aspartate receptor (NMDAR) antagonist, among other actions. Unlike levomethadone, it has low affinity for opioid receptors and lacks significant respiratory depressant action and abuse liability.

Esmethadone has been under development for major depressive disorder.

There is an asymmetric synthesis available to prepare both esmethadone (S-(+)-methadone) and levomethadone (R-(−)-methadone).

Receptor binding affinities of isomers of methadone
Compound	Affinities (K_{i}, in nM)						Ratios	
Compound	MOR	DOR	KOR	SERT	NET	NMDAR	M:D:K	SERT:NET
Racemic methadone	1.7	435	405	1,400	259	2,500–8,300	1:256:238	1:5
Dextromethadone	19.7	960	1,370	992	12,700	2,600–7,400	1:49:70	1:13
Levomethadone	0.945	371	1,860	14.1	702	2,800–3,400	1:393:1968	1:50
