= Diphenidol =

Antiemetic and antivertigo drug

Clinical data
- AHFS/Drugs.com: Micromedex Detailed Consumer Information
- Routes of administration: Oral
- ATC code: none

Pharmacokinetic data
- Elimination half-life: 4 hours

Identifiers
- IUPAC name: 1,1-di(phenyl)-4-piperidin-1-ylbutan-1-ol
- CAS Number: 972-02-1
- PubChem CID: 9175
- IUPHAR/BPS: 7163
- DrugBank: DB01231
- ChemSpider: 2947
- UNII: NQO8R319LY
- KEGG: D03858
- ChEBI: CHEBI:4638
- ChEMBL: ChEMBL936
- CompTox Dashboard (EPA): DTXSID3022950
- ECHA InfoCard: 100.012.310

Chemical and physical data
- Formula: C_{21}H_{27}NO
- Molar mass: 309.453 g·mol^{−1}
- 3D model (JSmol): Interactive image
- SMILES: OC(c1ccccc1)(c2ccccc2)CCCN3CCCCC3
- InChI: InChI=1S/C21H27NO/c23-21(19-11-4-1-5-12-19,20-13-6-2-7-14-20)15-10-18-22-16-8-3-9-17-22/h1-2,4-7,11-14,23H,3,8-10,15-18H2; Key:OGAKLTJNUQRZJU-UHFFFAOYSA-N

Diphenidol is a muscarinic antagonist employed as an antiemetic and as an antivertigo agent. It is not marketed in the United States or Canada.

Although the mechanism of action of diphenidol on the vestibular system has not yet been elucidated, it exerts an anticholinergic effect due to interactions with mACh receptors, particularly M_{1}, M_{2}, M_{3} and M_{4}. Hence, its actions may take place at the vestibular nuclei, where a significant excitatory input is mediated by ACh receptors, and also at the vestibular periphery where mACh receptors are expressed at efferent synapses. A series of selective mACh-receptor antagonists based on the diphenidol molecule has been synthesized, but they have not yet been the subject of clinical trials.

== Synthesis ==
Synthesis: 10%: Patents:

Alkylation of 1-Bromo-3-chloropropane [109-70-6] (1) with piperidine (2) gives 3-Piperidinopropyl chloride [1458-63-5] (3). The Grignard reaction of this intermediate with benzophenone [119-61-9] gives the benzhydrol and hence, Diphenidol (4).
