= 2-Ethylidene-1,5-dimethyl-3,3-diphenylpyrrolidine =

EDDP
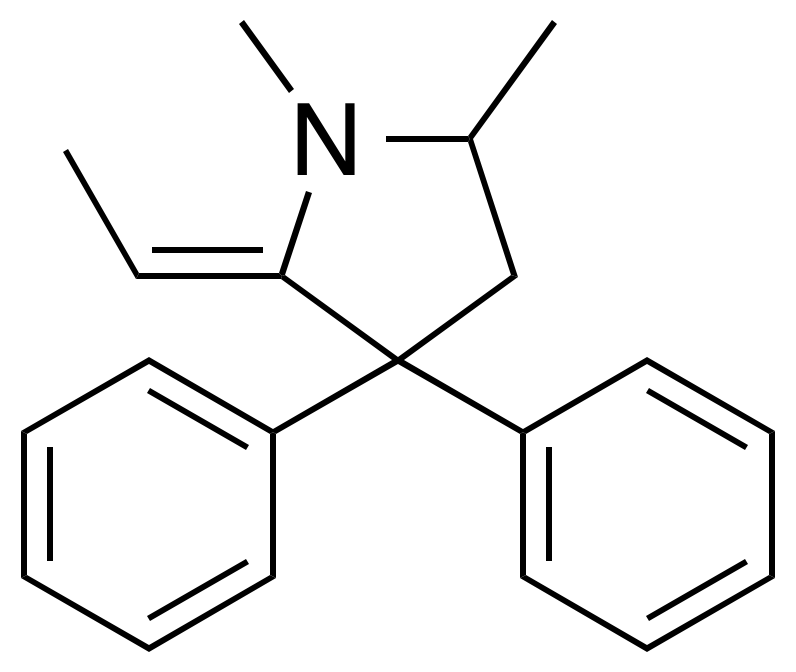
- Chemical structure of EDDP

Names
- IUPAC name 2-Ethylidene-1,5-dimethyl-3,3-diphenylpyrrolidine

Identifiers
CAS Number	30223-73-5
3D model (JSmol)	Interactive image
ChemSpider	4526936
PubChem CID	5378015
UNII	Z3LC48U94I
CompTox Dashboard (EPA)	DTXSID10880951
- InChI: InChI=1S/C20H23N/c1-4-19-20(15-16(2)21(19)3,17-11-7-5-8-12-17)18-13-9-6-10-14-18/h4-14,16H,15H2,1-3H3/b19-4- Key: AJRJPORIQGYFMT-PVOVUMCXSA-N
- SMILES: CC=C1C(CC(N1C)C)(C2=CC=CC=C2)C3=CC=CC=C3

Properties
Chemical formula	C_{20}H_{23}N
Molar mass	277.411 g·mol^{−1}
- Except where otherwise noted, data are given for materials in their standard state (at 25 °C [77 °F], 100 kPa). Infobox references

2-Ethylidene-1,5-dimethyl-3,3-diphenylpyrrolidine (EDDP) is a major metabolite of methadone.
