= Methadone =

Opioid analgesic

- Skeletal formula of methadone's enantiomers. (S) corresponds to the D-enantiomer, and (R) corresponds to the L-enantiomer.

Clinical data
- Trade names: Dolophine, Methadose, others
- Other names: Methadone Hydrochloride
- AHFS/Drugs.com: Monograph
- MedlinePlus: a682134
- License data: US DailyMed: Methadone
- Pregnancy category: AU: C
- Addiction liability: High
- Routes of administration: By mouth, intravenous, insufflation, sublingual, rectal
- Drug class: Opioid
- ATC code: N02AC52 (WHO) N07BC02 (WHO) QN02AC90 (WHO)

Legal status
- Legal status: AU: S8 (Controlled drug); BR: Class A1 (Narcotic drugs); CA: Schedule I; DE: Anlage III (Special prescription form required); NZ: Class B3; UK: Class A; US: Schedule II; EU: Rx-only; SE: Förteckning II

Pharmacokinetic data
- Bioavailability: Rectal: 76% SC: 79% Oral: 41–99% IV/IM: 100%
- Protein binding: 85–90%
- Metabolism: Liver (CYP3A4, CYP2B6 and CYP2D6-mediated)
- Metabolites: • EDDP • EDMP • para-Hydroxymethadone
- Onset of action: Rapid
- Elimination half-life: 15–55 hours
- Duration of action: Single dose: 4–8 h Prolonged use: • Withdrawal prevention: 1–2 days • Pain relief: 8–12 hours
- Excretion: Urine, faeces

Identifiers
- IUPAC name: (RS)-6-(Dimethylamino)-4,4-diphenyl-heptan-3-one
- CAS Number: 76-99-3
- PubChem CID: 4095
- IUPHAR/BPS: 5458
- DrugBank: DB00333
- ChemSpider: 3953
- UNII: UC6VBE7V1Z
- KEGG: D08195
- ChEBI: CHEBI:6807
- ChEMBL: ChEMBL651
- CompTox Dashboard (EPA): DTXSID7023273
- ECHA InfoCard: 100.000.907

Chemical and physical data
- Formula: C_{21}H_{27}NO
- Molar mass: 309.453 g·mol^{−1}
- 3D model (JSmol): Interactive image
- Chirality: Racemic mixture
- SMILES: CCC(C(C1=CC=CC=C1)(C2=CC=CC=C2)CC(N(C)C)C)=O
- InChI: InChI=1S/C21H27NO/c1-5-20(23)21(16-17(2)22(3)4,18-12-8-6-9-13-18)19-14-10-7-11-15-19/h6-15,17H,5,16H2,1-4H3; Key:USSIQXCVUWKGNF-UHFFFAOYSA-N

Methadone, sold under the brand names Dolophine and Methadose, among others, is a potent synthetic opioid used medically to treat chronic pain and opioid use disorder. Prescribed for daily use, the medicine relieves cravings and opioid withdrawal symptoms. Withdrawal management using methadone can be accomplished in less than a month, or it may be done gradually over a longer period of time, or simply maintained for the rest of the patient's life. While a single dose has a rapid effect, maximum effect can take up to five days of use. After long-term use, in people with normal liver function, effects last 8 to 36 hours. Methadone is usually taken by mouth and rarely by injection into a muscle or vein.

Side effects are similar to those of other opioids. These frequently include dizziness, sleepiness, nausea, vomiting, and sweating. Serious risks include opioid abuse and respiratory depression. Abnormal heart rhythms may also occur due to a prolonged QT interval. The number of deaths in the United States involving methadone poisoning declined from 4,418 in 2011 to 3,300 in 2015. Risks are greater with higher doses. Methadone is made by chemical synthesis and acts on opioid receptors.

Methadone was developed in Germany in the late 1930s by Gustav Ehrhart and Max Bockmühl. It was approved for use as an analgesic in the United States in 1947, and has been used in the treatment of addiction since the 1960s. It is on the World Health Organization's List of Essential Medicines.

== Medical uses ==
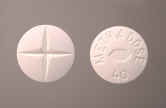
Methadose (methadone) 40 mg tablet

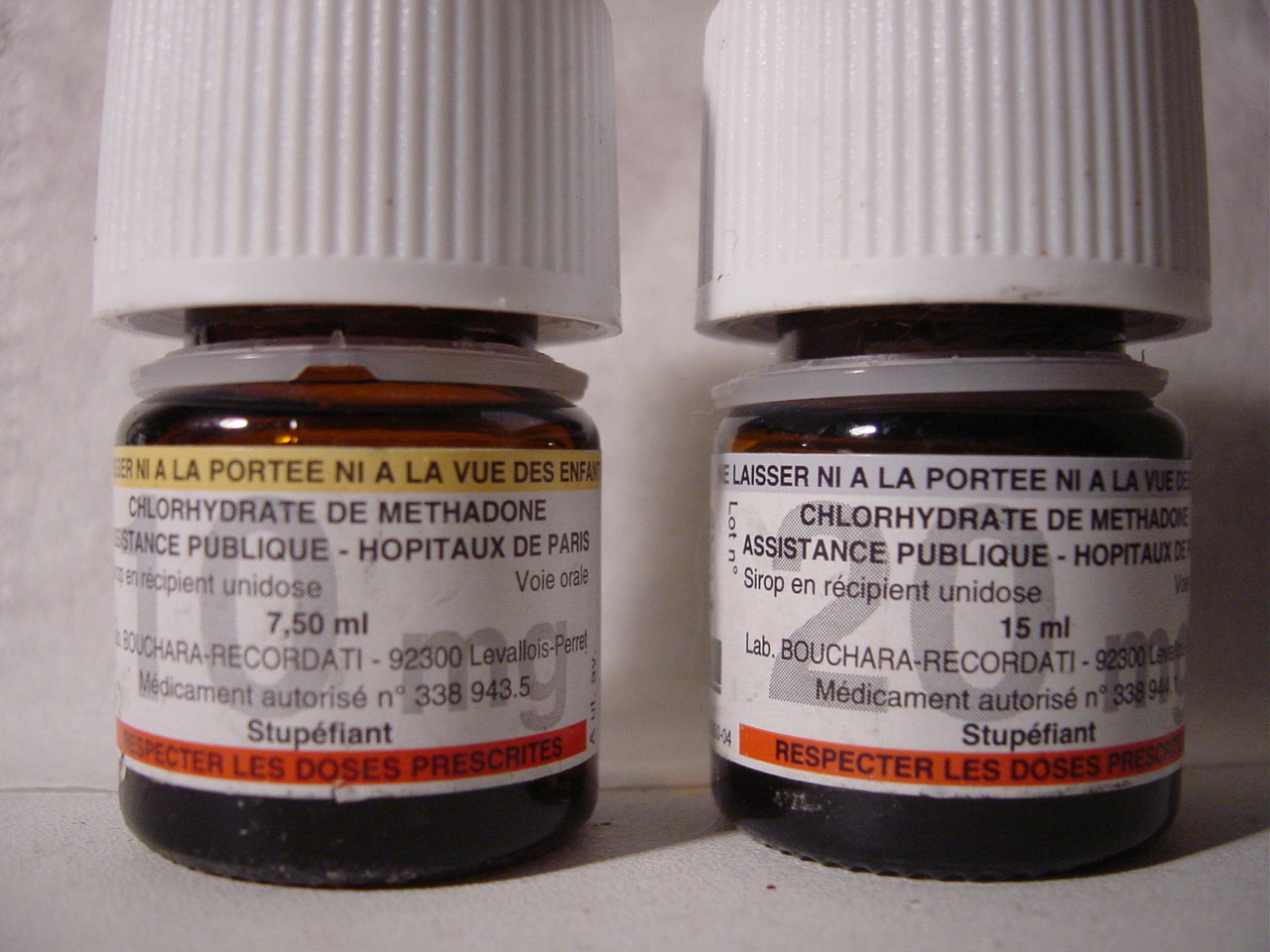
Two single-dose bottles of methadone syrup for oral administration (two different dosages: 10 mg and 20 mg)

=== Opioid addiction ===
Methadone is used for the treatment of opioid use disorder. It may be used as maintenance therapy or in shorter periods to manage opioid withdrawal symptoms. Its use for the treatment of addiction is usually strictly regulated. In the US, outpatient treatment programs must be certified by the federal Substance Abuse and Mental Health Services Administration (SAMHSA) and registered by the Drug Enforcement Administration (DEA) to prescribe methadone for opioid addiction.

A 2009 Cochrane review found methadone was effective in retaining people in treatment and the reduction or cessation of heroin use as measured by self-report and urine/hair analysis and did not affect criminal activity or risk of death.

Treatment of opioid-dependent persons with methadone follows one of two routes: maintenance or withdrawal management. Methadone maintenance therapy (MMT) usually takes place in outpatient settings. It is usually prescribed as a single daily dose medication for those who wish to abstain from illicit opioid use. Treatment models for MMT differ. It is not uncommon for treatment recipients to be administered methadone in a specialized clinic, where they are observed for around 15–20 minutes post-dosing, to reduce the risk of diversion of medication.

The duration of methadone treatment programs ranges from a few months to years. Given opioid dependence is characteristically a chronic relapsing/remitting disorder, MMT may be lifelong. The length of time a person remains in treatment depends on a number of factors. While starting doses may be adjusted based on the amount of opioids reportedly used, most clinical guidelines suggest doses start low (e.g., at doses not exceeding 40 mg daily) and be titrated gradually. It has been found that doses of 40 mg per day were sufficient to help control the withdrawal symptoms but not enough to curb the cravings for the drug. Doses of 80 to 100 mg per day have shown higher rates of success in patients and less illicit heroin use during the maintenance therapy. However, higher doses do put a patient more at risk for overdose than a moderately low dose (e.g. 20 mg/day).

Methadone maintenance has been shown to reduce the transmission of bloodborne viruses associated with opioid injection, such as hepatitis B and C, and/or HIV. The principal goals of methadone maintenance are to relieve opioid cravings, suppress the abstinence syndrome, and block the euphoric effects associated with opioids.

Chronic methadone dosing will eventually lead to neuroadaptation, characterised by tolerance and dependence. However, when used correctly in treatment, maintenance therapy is medically safe, non-sedating, and can provide a slow recovery from opioid addiction. Methadone has been widely used for pregnant women addicted to opioids.

=== Pain ===
Methadone is used as an analgesic in chronic pain, often in rotation with other opioids. Due to its activity at the NMDA receptor, it may be more effective against neuropathic pain; for the same reason, tolerance to the analgesic effects may be less than that of other opioids.

== Adverse effects ==
Table from the 2010 ISCD study ranking various drugs (legal and illegal) based on statements by drug-harm experts. Methadone was found to be the 12th overall most dangerous drug.

Addiction experts in psychiatry, chemistry, pharmacology, forensic science, epidemiology, and the police and legal services engaged in delphic analysis regarding 20 popular recreational drugs. Street methadone was ranked 4th in dependence, 5th in physical harm, and 5th in social harm.

Adverse effects of methadone include:

- Sedation
- Constipation
- Flushing
- Perspiration
- Heat intolerance
- Dizziness or fainting
- Weakness
- Fatigue
- Drowsiness
- Constricted pupils
- Dry mouth
- Nausea and vomiting
- Low blood pressure
- Headache
- Heart problems such as chest pain or fast heartbeat
- Abnormal heart rhythms
- Respiratory problems such as trouble breathing, slow or shallow breathing (hypoventilation), lightheadedness, or fainting
- Weight gain
- Memory loss
- Itching
- Difficulty urinating
- Swelling of the hands, arms, feet, and legs
- Mood changes, (e.g., euphoria, disorientation)
- Blurred vision
- Decreased libido, difficulty in reaching orgasm, or impotence
- Missed menstrual periods
- Skin rash
- Central sleep apnea

When used for opioid maintenance therapy, Methadone is generally administered as an oral liquid. Methadone has been implicated in contributing to significant tooth decay. Methadone causes dry mouth, reducing the protective role of saliva in preventing decay. Other putative mechanisms of methadone-related tooth decay include craving for carbohydrates related to opioids, poor dental care, and a general decrease in personal hygiene. These factors, combined with sedation, have been linked to the causation of extensive dental damage.

=== Withdrawal ===
Methadone withdrawal symptoms are reported as being significantly more protracted than withdrawal from opioids with shorter half-lives.

==== Physical symptoms ====
- Lightheadedness
- Tearing of the eyes
- Mydriasis (dilated pupils)
- Photophobia (sensitivity to light)
- Hyperventilation (breathing that is too fast/deep)
- Runny nose
- Yawning
- Sneezing
- Nausea, vomiting, and diarrhea
- Fever
- Sweating
- Chills
- Tremors
- Akathisia (restlessness)
- Tachycardia (fast heartbeat)
- Aches and pains, often in the joints or legs
- Elevated pain sensitivity
- Blood pressure that is too high (hypertension, may cause a stroke)

==== Cognitive symptoms ====
- Suicidal ideation
- Susceptibility to cravings
- Depression
- Spontaneous orgasm
- Prolonged insomnia
- Delirium
- Auditory hallucinations
- Visual hallucinations
- Increased perception of odors (olfaction), real or imagined
- Marked decrease in sex drive
- Agitation
- Anxiety
- Panic disorder
- Nervousness
- Paranoia
- Delusions
- Apathy
- Anorexia (symptom)

=== Black box warning ===
Methadone has the following U.S. FDA black box warning:

- Risk of addiction and abuse
- Potentially fatal respiratory depression
- Lethal overdose in accidental ingestion
- QT prolongation
- Neonatal opioid withdrawal syndrome in children of pregnant women
- CYP450 drug interactions
- Risks when used with alcohol, benzodiazepines, and other CNS depressants.
- A certified opioid treatment program is required under federal law (42 CFR 8.12) when dispensing methadone for the treatment of opioid addiction.

=== Overdose ===
Most people who overdose on methadone show some of the following symptoms:

- Miosis (constricted pupils)
- Vomiting
- Spasms of the stomach and intestines
- Hypoventilation (breathing that is too slow/shallow)
- Drowsiness, sleepiness, disorientation, sedation, unresponsiveness
- Skin that is cool, clammy (damp), and pale
- Blue fingernails and lips
- Limp muscles, trouble staying awake, nausea
- Unconsciousness and coma

The respiratory depression of an overdose can be treated with naloxone. Naloxone is preferred to the newer, longer-acting antagonist naltrexone. Despite methadone's much longer duration of action compared to heroin and other shorter-acting agonists and the need for repeat doses of the antagonist naloxone, it is still used for overdose therapy. As naltrexone has a longer half-life, it is more difficult to titrate. If too large a dose of the opioid antagonist is given to a dependent person, it will result in withdrawal symptoms (possibly severe). When using naloxone, the naloxone will be quickly eliminated and the withdrawal will be short-lived. Doses of methadone take longer to be eliminated from the person's system. A common problem in treating methadone overdoses is that given the short action of naloxone (versus the extremely longer-acting methadone), a dosage of naloxone given to a methadone-overdosed person will initially work to bring the person out of overdose, but once the naloxone wears off, if no further naloxone is administered, the person can go right back into overdose (based upon time and dosage of the methadone ingested).

=== Tolerance and dependence ===
As with other opioid medications, tolerance and dependence usually develop with repeated doses. There is some clinical evidence that tolerance to analgesia is less with methadone compared to other opioids; this may be due to its activity at the NMDA receptor. Tolerance to the different physiological effects of methadone varies; tolerance to analgesic properties may or may not develop quickly, but tolerance to euphoria usually develops rapidly, whereas tolerance to constipation, sedation, and respiratory depression develops slowly (if ever).

=== Driving ===
Methadone treatment may impair driving ability. Drug abusers had significantly more involvement in serious crashes than non-abusers in a study by the University of Queensland. In the study of a group of 220 drug abusers, most of them poly-drug abusers, 17 were involved in crashes killing people, compared with a control group of other people randomly selected having no involvement in fatal crashes. However, there have been multiple studies verifying the ability of methadone maintenance patients to drive. In the UK, persons who are prescribed oral methadone can continue to drive after they have satisfactorily completed an independent medical examination which will include a urine screen for drugs. The license will be issued for 12 months at a time and even then, only following a favourable assessment from their own doctor. Individuals who are prescribed methadone for either IV or IM administration cannot drive in the UK, mainly due to the increased sedation effects that this route of use can cause.

=== Mortality ===
In the United States, deaths linked to methadone more than quadrupled in the five-year period between 1999 and 2004. According to the U.S. National Center for Health Statistics, as well as a 2006 series in the Charleston Gazette (West Virginia), medical examiners listed methadone as contributing to 3,849 deaths in 2004. That number was up from 790 in 1999. Approximately 82 percent of those deaths were listed as accidental, and most deaths involved combinations of methadone with other drugs (especially benzodiazepines).

Although deaths from methadone are on the rise, methadone-associated deaths are not being caused primarily by methadone intended for methadone treatment programs, according to a panel of experts convened by the Substance Abuse and Mental Health Services Administration, which released a report titled "Methadone-Associated Mortality, Report of a National Assessment". The consensus report concludes that "although the data remains incomplete, National Assessment meeting participants concurred that methadone tablets or Diskets distributed through channels other than opioid treatment programs most likely are the central factors in methadone-associated mortality."

In 2006, the U.S. Food and Drug Administration issued a caution about methadone, titled "Methadone Use for Pain Control May Result in Death." The FDA also revised the drug's package insert. The change deleted previous information about the usual adult dosage. The Charleston Gazette reported, "The old language about the 'usual adult dose' was potentially deadly, according to pain specialists."

== Pharmacology ==
Receptor binding affinities of isomers of methadone
Compound	Affinities (K_{i}, in nM)						Ratios	
Compound	MOR	DOR	KOR	SERT	NET	NMDAR	M:D:K	SERT:NET
Racemic methadone	1.7	435	405	1,400	259	2,500–8,300	1:256:238	1:5
Dextromethadone	19.7	960	1,370	992	12,700	2,600–7,400	1:49:70	1:13
Levomethadone	0.945	371	1,860	14.1	702	2,800–3,400	1:393:1968	1:50

Methadone acts by binding to the μ-opioid receptor, but also has some affinity for the NMDA receptor, an ionotropic glutamate receptor. Methadone is metabolized by CYP3A4, CYP2B6, CYP2D6, and is a substrate, or in this case target, for the P-glycoprotein efflux protein, a protein which helps pump foreign substances out of cells, in the intestines and brain. The bioavailability and elimination half-life of methadone are subject to substantial interindividual variability. Its main route of administration is oral. Adverse effects include sedation, hypoventilation, constipation, and miosis, in addition to tolerance, dependence, and withdrawal difficulties. The withdrawal period can be much more prolonged than with other opioids, spanning anywhere from two weeks to several months.

The metabolic half-life of methadone differs from its duration of action. The metabolic half-life is 8 to 59 hours (approximately 24 hours for opioid-tolerant people, and 55 hours for opioid-naive people), as opposed to a half-life of 1 to 5 hours for morphine. The length of the half-life of methadone allows for the exhibition of respiratory depressant effects for an extended duration of time in opioid-naive people.

Methadone at therapeutic concentrations is known to prolong the QTc interval, which indicates that the heart muscle repolarizes more slowly. This QTc prolongation tends to increase the risk of torsades de pointes (TdP), a heart rhythm disturbance that can lead to syncope or sudden death. In a large observational study in Sweden, methadone was associated with a particularly high incidence of TdP, especially in younger patients. The incidence of TdP was 41.9 cases per 100,000 users of methadone in the 18-64 year old age group. In this study of TdP, methadone was the highest-risk drug in the 18-64 year-old group, with the sole exception of the antiarrhythmic drug amiodarone, which was associated with 66.5 cases of TdP per 100,000 amiodarone users. The high incidence of TdP in amiodarone-treated patients may indicate correlation and not causation because amiodarone is often prescribed to patients with preexisting heart conditions that independently increase the risk of TdP. Methadone likely causes cardiac arrhythmias (such as TdP) via two mechanisms. Like many other cardiotoxic drugs, methadone blocks the hERG K+ channel. The two enantiomers of methadone inhibit hERG channels with different potency. Dextromethadone, which is less potent as an opioid, is more potent at blocking the hERG channel with an IC_{50} of ~12 μM. Levomethadone has a lower affinity, with an IC_{50} of ~29 μM at the hERG channel. Methadone is also known to block the Na_{v}1.5 voltage-gated Na+ channel (SCN5A) with an IC_{50} of ~10 μM, which is similar to the local anesthetic bupivacaine. Both enantiomers of methadone block the Na_{v}1.5 channel with similar affinities. Bupivacaine is especially cardiotoxic among local anesthetics, and it is believed to act via this same sodium channel. Plasma concentrations of methadone in recovering addicts can reach 4 μM during therapy, so the actions of methadone at both the hERG potassium channel and the Na_{v}1.5 sodium channel are possibly clinically relevant in producing cardiac side effects. This also suggests that levomethadone is not completely free of cardiac toxicity.

=== Mechanism of action ===
Levomethadone (the R-(–)-methadone enantiomer) is a μ-opioid receptor agonist with higher intrinsic activity than morphine, but lower affinity. Dextromethadone (the S-(+)-methadone enantiomer) has a much lower affinity to the μ-opioid receptor than levomethadone. Both enantiomers bind to the glutamatergic NMDA (N-methyl-D-aspartate) receptor, acting as noncompetitive antagonists. Methadone has been shown to reduce neuropathic pain in rat models, primarily through NMDA receptor antagonism. NMDA antagonists such as dextromethorphan, ketamine, tiletamine and ibogaine are being studied for their role in decreasing the development of tolerance to opioids and as possible for eliminating addiction/tolerance/withdrawal, possibly by disrupting memory circuitry. Acting as an NMDA antagonist may be one mechanism by which methadone decreases craving for opioids and tolerance, and has been proposed as a possible mechanism for its distinguished efficacy regarding the treatment of neuropathic pain. Methadone also acted as a potent, noncompetitive α_{3}β_{4} neuronal nicotinic acetylcholine receptor antagonist in rat receptors, expressed in human embryonic kidney cell lines.

=== Metabolism ===
Methadone has a slow metabolism and very high fat solubility, making it longer lasting than morphine-based drugs. Methadone has a typical elimination half-life of 15 to 60 hours with a mean of around 22. However, metabolism rates vary greatly between individuals, up to a factor of 100, ranging from as few as 4 hours to as many as 130 hours, or even 190 hours. This variability is apparently due to genetic variability in the production of the associated cytochrome enzymes CYP3A4, CYP2B6 and CYP2D6. Many substances can also induce, inhibit or compete with these enzymes further affecting (sometimes dangerously) methadone half-life. A longer half-life frequently allows for administration only once a day in opioid withdrawal management and maintenance programs. People who metabolize methadone rapidly, on the other hand, may require twice daily dosing to obtain sufficient symptom alleviation while avoiding excessive peaks and troughs in their blood concentrations and associated effects. This can also allow lower total doses in some such people. The analgesic activity is shorter than the pharmacological half-life; dosing for pain control usually requires multiple doses per day normally dividing daily dosage for administration at 8-hour intervals.

The main metabolic pathway involves N-demethylation by CYP3A4 in the liver and intestine to give 2-ethylidene-1,5-dimethyl-3,3-diphenylpyrrolidine (EDDP). This inactive product, as well as the inactive 2-ethyl-5-methyl-3,3-diphenyl-1-pyrroline (EMDP), produced by a second N-demethylation, are detectable in the urine of those taking methadone.

Methadone, its two main metabolites, and its secondary metabolite

Methadone

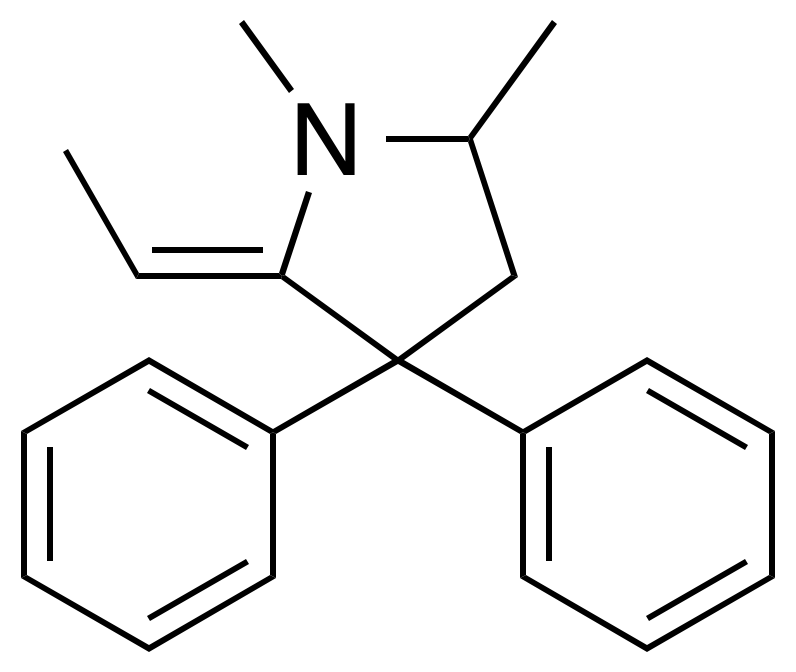
EDDP

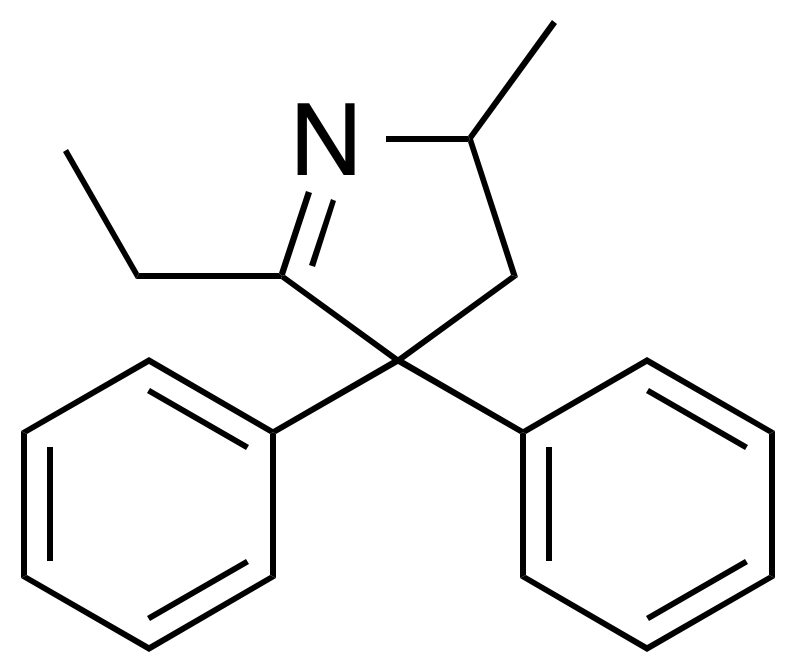
EDMP

para-Hydroxymethadone
Para-hydroxylation of the aromatic ring at the 4-position is a secondary metabolic pathway of methadone; it did not exhibit opioid activity.

=== Route of administration ===
The most common route of administration at a methadone clinic is in a racemic oral solution, though in Germany, only the R enantiomer (the L optical isomer) has traditionally been used, as it is responsible for most of the desired opioid effects. The single-isomer form is becoming less common due to the higher production costs.

Methadone is available in traditional pills, sublingual tablets, and two different formulations designed for the person to drink. Drinkable forms include ready-to-dispense liquid (sold in the United States as Methadose), and Diskets (known on the street as "wafers" or "biscuits") tablets which are dispersible in water for oral administration, used similarly to Alka-Seltzer. The liquid form is the most common as it allows for smaller dose changes. Methadone is almost as effective when administered orally as by injection. Oral medication is usually preferable because it offers safety, and simplicity and represents a step away from injection-based drug abuse in those recovering from addiction. U.S. federal regulations require the oral form in addiction treatment programs. Injecting methadone pills can cause collapsed veins, bruising, swelling, and possibly other harmful effects. Methadone pills often contain talc that, when injected, produces a swarm of tiny solid particles in the blood, causing numerous minor blood clots. These particles cannot be filtered out before injection, and will accumulate in the body over time, especially in the lungs and eyes, producing various complications such as pulmonary hypertension, an irreversible and progressive disease. The formulation sold under the brand name Methadose (flavored liquid suspension for oral dosing, commonly used for maintenance purposes) should not be injected either.

Information leaflets included in packs of UK methadone tablets state that the tablets are for oral use only and that use by any other route can cause serious harm. In addition to this warning, additives have now been included in the tablet formulation to make the use of them by the IV route more difficult.

Methadone is also available in ampoules with strength of 50mg/ml & 10mg/ml for IV/IM/SC use in the UK. Prescribing the injectable formulation was more common in the 90s with prescribers reporting that up to 9-10% of all methadone prescription were for ampoules. This practice is much less common nowadays

== Chemistry ==
=== Detection in biological fluids ===
Methadone and its major metabolite, 2-ethylidene-1,5-dimethyl-3,3-diphenylpyrrolidine (EDDP), are often measured in urine as part of a drug abuse testing program, in plasma or serum to confirm a diagnosis of poisoning in hospitalized victims, or in whole blood to assist in a forensic investigation of a traffic or other criminal violation or a case of sudden death. Methadone usage history is considered in interpreting the results as a chronic user can develop tolerance to doses that would incapacitate an opioid-naïve individual. Chronic users often have high methadone and EDDP baseline values.

=== Conformation ===
The protonated form of methadone takes on an extended conformation, while the free base is more compact. In particular, it was found that there is an interaction between the tertiary amine and the carbonyl carbon of the ketone function (R_{3}N ••• >C=O) that limits the molecule's conformation freedom, though the distance (291 pm by X-ray) is far too long to represent a true chemical bond. However, it does represent the initial trajectory of attack of an amine on a carbonyl group and was an important piece of experimental evidence for the proposal of the Bürgi–Dunitz angle for carbonyl addition reactions.

== History ==
Methadone was developed in 1937 in Germany by scientists working for I.G. Farbenindustrie AG at the Farbwerke Hoechst who were looking for a synthetic opioid that could be created with readily available precursors, to solve Germany's opium and morphine shortage problem. On 11 September 1941 Bockmühl and Ehrhart filed an application for a patent for a synthetic substance they called Hoechst 10820 or Polamidon (a name still in regular use in Germany) and whose structure had little relation to morphine or other "true opiates" such as diamorphine (Heroin), desomorphine (Permonid), nicomorphine (Vilan), codeine, dihydrocodeine, oxymorphone (Opana), hydromorphone (Dilaudid), oxycodone (OxyContin), hydrocodone (Dicodid), and other closely related opium alkaloid derivatives and analogues. It was brought to market in 1943 and was widely used by the German army during WWII as a substitute for morphine.

In the 1930s, pethidine (meperidine) went into production in Germany; however, the production of methadone, then being developed under the designation Hoechst 10820, was not carried forward because of side effects discovered in the early research. After the war, all German patents, trade names, and research records were requisitioned and expropriated by the Allies. The records on the research work of the I.G. Farbenkonzern at the Farbwerke Hoechst were confiscated by the U.S. Department of Commerce Intelligence, investigated by a Technical Industrial Committee of the U.S. Department of State and then brought to the US. The report published by the committee noted that while methadone itself was potentially addictive, it produced "considerably" less euphoria, sedation, and respiratory depression than morphine at equianalgesic doses and was thus interesting as a commercial drug. The same report also compared methadone to pethidine. German researchers reported that methadone was capable of producing strong morphine-like physical dependence, which is characterized by opioid withdrawal symptoms which are lesser in severity and intensity compared to morphine, but methadone was associated with a considerably prolonged or protracted withdrawal syndrome when compared to morphine. Morphine produced higher rates of self-administration and reinforcing behaviour in both human and animal subjects when compared to both methadone and pethidine. In comparison to equianalgesic doses of pethidine (Demerol), methadone was shown to produce less euphoria, but higher rates of constipation, and roughly equal levels of respiratory depression and sedation.

In the early 1950s, methadone (most times the racemic HCl salts mixture) was also investigated for use as an antitussive.

Isomethadone, noracymethadol, LAAM, and normethadone were first developed in Germany, the United Kingdom, Belgium, Austria, Canada, and the United States in the thirty or so years after the 1937 discovery of pethidine, the first synthetic opioid used in medicine. These synthetic opioids have increased length and depth of satiating any opiate cravings and generate very strong analgesic effects due to their long metabolic half-life and strong receptor affinity at the mu-opioid receptor sites. Therefore, they impart much of the satiating and anti-addictive effects of methadone by suppressing drug cravings.

It was only in 1947 that the drug was given the generic name "methadone" by the Council on Pharmacy and Chemistry of the American Medical Association. Since the patent rights of the I.G. Farbenkonzern and Farbwerke Hoechst were no longer protected, each pharmaceutical company interested in the formula could buy the rights for the commercial production of methadone for just one dollar (MOLL 1990).

Methadone was introduced into the United States in 1947 by Eli Lilly and Company as an analgesic under the trade name Dolophine. An urban myth later arose that Nazi leader Adolf Hitler ordered the manufacture of methadone or that the brand name 'Dolophine' was named after him, probably based on the similarity of "doloph" with "Adolph". (The pejorative term "adolphine" would appear in the early 1970s.) However, the name "Dolophine" was a contraction of "Dolo" from the Latin word dolor (pain), and finis, the Latin word for "end". Therefore, Dolophine literally means "pain end".

Methadone was studied as a treatment for opioid addiction at the Addiction Research Center of the Narcotics Farm in Lexington, Kentucky in the 1950s, and by Rockefeller University physicians Robert Dole and Marie Nyswander in the 1960s in New York City. By 1976, methadone clinics had opened in cities including Chicago, New York, and New Haven, with some 38,000 patients treated in New York City alone.

== Society and culture ==
=== Brand names ===
Brand names include Dolophine, Symoron, Amidone, Methadose, Physeptone, Metadon, Metadol, Metadol-D, Heptanon and Heptadon among others.

=== Economics ===
In the US, generic methadone tablets are inexpensive, with retail prices ranging from $0.25 to $2.50 per defined daily dose.

Methadone maintenance clinics in the US may be covered by private insurance, Medicaid, or Medicare. Medicare covers methadone under the prescription drug benefit, Medicare Part D, when it is prescribed for pain, but not when it is used for opioid dependence treatment because it cannot be dispensed in a retail pharmacy for this purpose. In California methadone maintenance treatment is covered under the medical benefit. Patients' eligibility for methadone maintenance treatment is most often contingent on them being enrolled in substance abuse counseling. People on methadone maintenance in the US either have to pay cash or if covered by insurance must complete a pre-determined number of hours per month in therapeutic groups or counseling. The United States Department of Veteran's Affairs (VA) Alcohol and Drug Dependence Rehabilitation Program offers methadone services to eligible veterans enrolled in the VA health care system.

Methadone maintenance treatment (MMT) cost analyses often compare the cost of clinic visits versus the overall societal costs of illicit opioid use. A preliminary cost analysis conducted in 2016 by the US Department of Defense determined that methadone treatment, which includes psychosocial and support services, may cost an average of $126.00 per week or $6,552.00 per year. The average cost for one full year of methadone maintenance treatment is approximately $4,700 per patient, whereas one full year of imprisonment costs approximately $24,000 per person.

== Regulation ==
=== United States and Canada ===
Methadone is a Schedule I controlled substance in Canada and Schedule II in the United States, with an ACSCN of 9250 and a 2014 annual aggregate manufacturing quota of 31,875 kilos for sale. Methadone intermediate is also controlled, under ACSCN 9226 also under Schedule II, with a quota of 38,875 kilos. In most countries of the world, methadone is similarly restricted. The salts of methadone in use are the hydrobromide (free base conversion ratio 0.793), hydrochloride (0.894), and HCl monohydrate (0.850). Methadone is also regulated internationally as a Schedule I controlled substance under the United Nations Single Convention on Narcotic Drugs of 1961.

==== Methadone clinics ====
In the United States, prescription of methadone requires intensive monitoring and must be obtained in-person from an Opioid Treatment Program—colloquially known as a 'methadone clinic'—when prescribed for opioid use disorder (OUD). According to federal laws, methadone cannot be prescribed by a doctor and obtained from a pharmacy to treat addiction. Because of its long half-life, methadone is almost invariably prescribed to be taken in a single daily dose. At nearly all methadone clinics in the US, patients must visit a clinic to receive and take their dose under the supervision of a nurse. Patients earn take home bottles with their daily dose, by providing clean drug tests and doing therapy. These bottles will be taken away if they provide a dirty drug test, or break clinic rules. They can be earned back. Both patients who are new to methadone treatment and high-risk patients—such as those who are using drugs and alcohol, including cannabis in some states—must visit the clinic daily.

=== Other countries ===
In Russia, methadone treatment is illegal. In 2008, the Chief Sanitary Inspector of Russia Gennadiy Onishchenko, stated that Russian health officials were not convinced of methadone's efficacy in treating heroin and/or opioid addiction. Instead of replacement therapy and gradual reduction of illicit drug use, Russian doctors encouraged immediate cessation and withdrawal. People who use drugs were generally given sedatives and non-opioid analgesics to cope with withdrawal symptoms.

As of 2015, China had the largest methadone maintenance treatment program with over 250,000 people in over 650 clinics in 27 provinces.

== Veterinary use ==
Methadone is a common perioperative analgesic in cats and dogs with a variety of routes of administration. Methadone in combination with acepromazine provides greater sedation than the equivalent combination involving morphine or butorphanol. Methadone's depressive effect on the cardiovascular system is approximately twice as strong as morphine. Methadone is contradicated for gastroduodenoscopy. Methadone provides greater analgesia than buprenorphine for orthopaedic and ovariohysterectomy procedures in dogs. Fluconazole and methadone given concurrently as a subcutaneous administration twice over a 6 hour period can provide analgesia for 12–24 hours. Methadone can be used for sedation in horses but is less effective than butorphanol, it can be combined with detomidine, which improves efficacy but can cause ataxia although the combination with detomidine has significantly less cardiovascular depressive effects than a combination with acepromazine. Methadone may be more effective as an analgesic in horses when adiminstered parenterally or epidurally as opposed to intravenously. Opioids are uncommon for livestock due to legislation surrounding usage but intravenous methadone is an effective analgesic in sheep and epidural methadone is an effective analgesic in cattle and sheep.

Methadone comes as levomethadone and dextromethadone with the former sometimes combined with the anti-cholinergic fenpipramide. Oral methadone is poorly absorbed in most species.
