= Higganum Landing Historic District =

Historic district in Connecticut, United States

- U.S. National Register of Historic Places
- U.S. Historic district
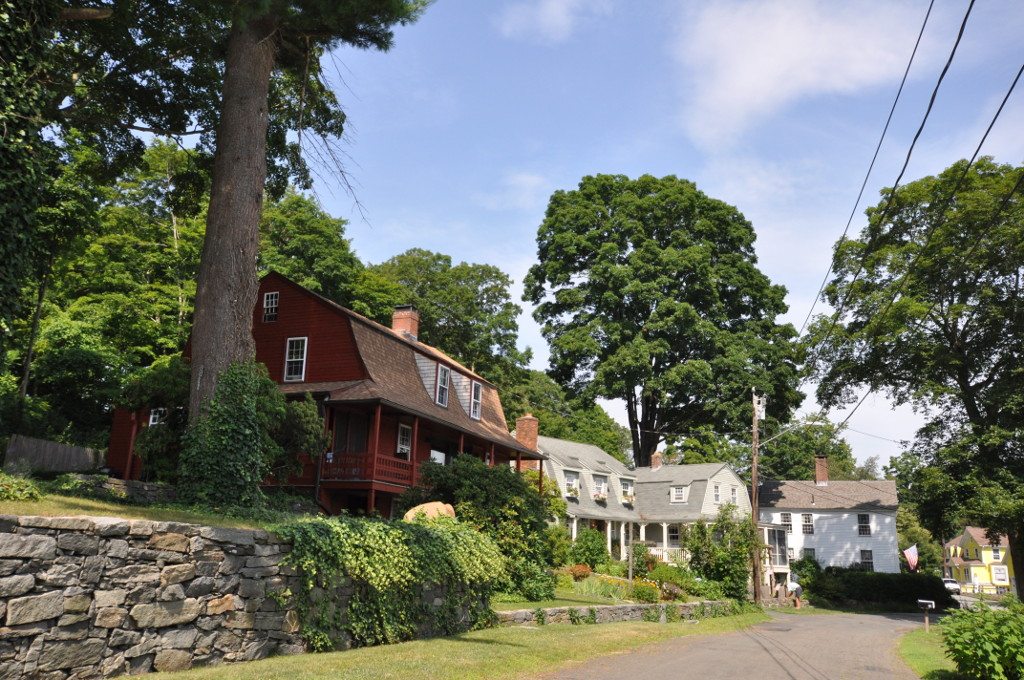
- Higganum Landing Historic District, 2019

- Location within Connecticut
- Location: 40-68 Landing Road, 2-14 Landing Road South, Haddam, CT
- Coordinates: 41°27′00″N 72°32′55″W
- Area: 5.22 acres (2.11 ha)
- Built: 1768–1870
- Architectural style: Colonial, Federal
- NRHP reference No.: 100003206
- Added to NRHP: December 10, 2018

Higganum Landing Historic District is a historic district in Haddam, Connecticut. It was listed on the National Register of Historic Places on December 10, 2018. It is located within a larger, 50-acre historic district that was listed on the Connecticut State Register of Historic Places on March 25, 1987.

Currently a residential neighborhood, Higganum Landing was a successful trading port and shipbuilding center between 1760 and 1870. The gentle bend of the Connecticut River created a natural harbor where more than 150 vessels were constructed. The district is architecturally significant because of its nine historic houses, built in the Cape Cod, Georgian, and Federal styles during the late 1700s through the mid-1800s.

== See also ==
- Haddam Center Historic District
- James Hazelton House in Haddam
- National Register of Historic Places listings in Middlesex County, Connecticut
