= Higganum Reservoir State Park =

State park in Middlesex County, Connecticut

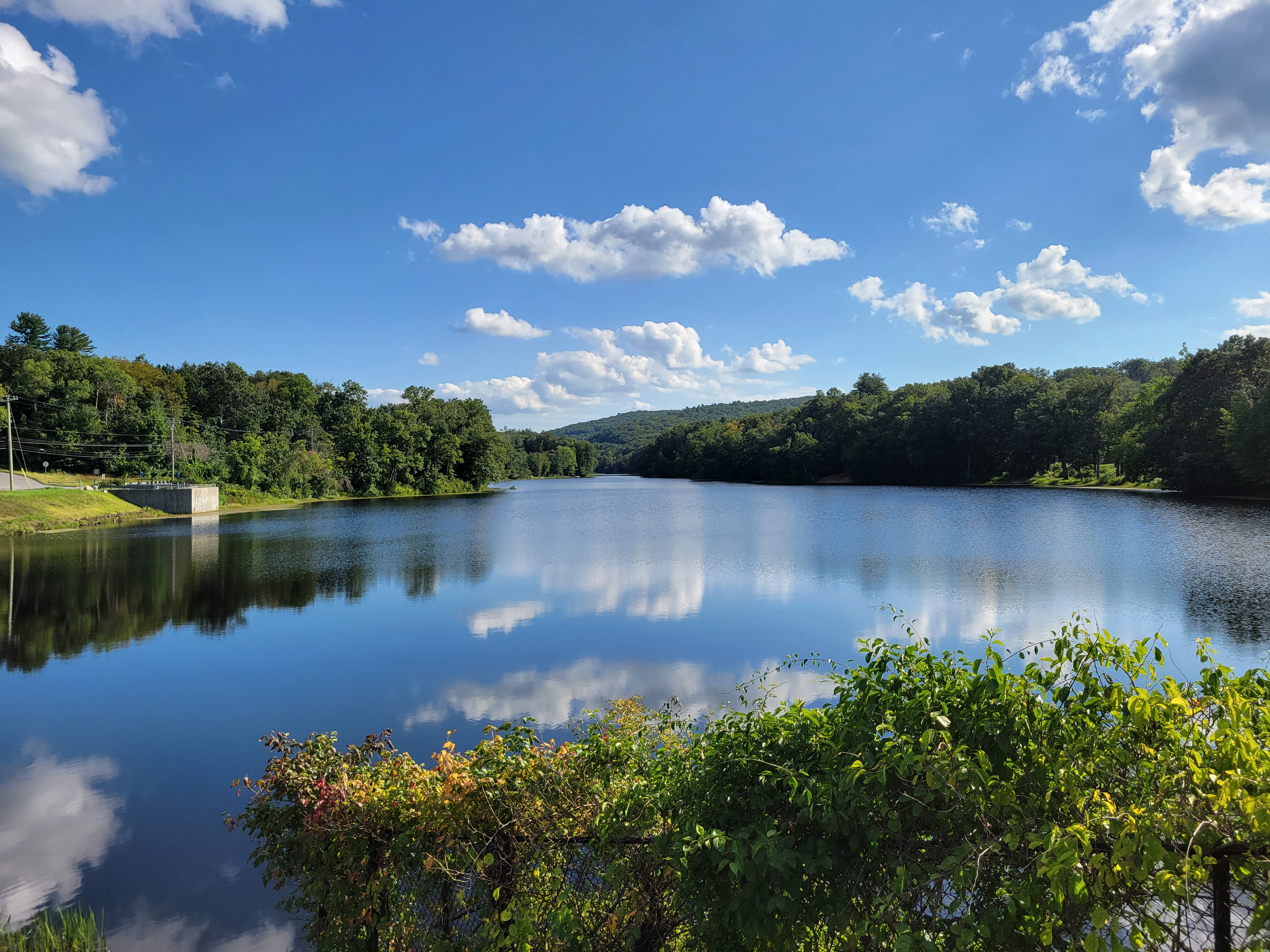
- Higganum Reservoir

- Location within Connecticut Location within the United States
- Location: Haddam, Connecticut, United States
- Coordinates: 41°29′14″N 72°33′37″W
- Area: 147 acres (59 ha)
- Elevation: 95 ft (29 m)
- Established: 1955
- Administrator: Connecticut Department of Energy and Environmental Protection
- Designation: Connecticut state park
- Website: Official website

Higganum Reservoir State Park is a public recreation area occupying 147 acres (59 ha) on the banks of Higganum Reservoir in the town of Haddam, Connecticut. The state park offers fishing, hiking, hunting, and a launch area for car-top boating. It entered the state rolls as a 75-acre state park in the 1955 edition of the Connecticut Register and Manual.
