= Higganum Reservoir =

Reservoir in central Connecticut, US

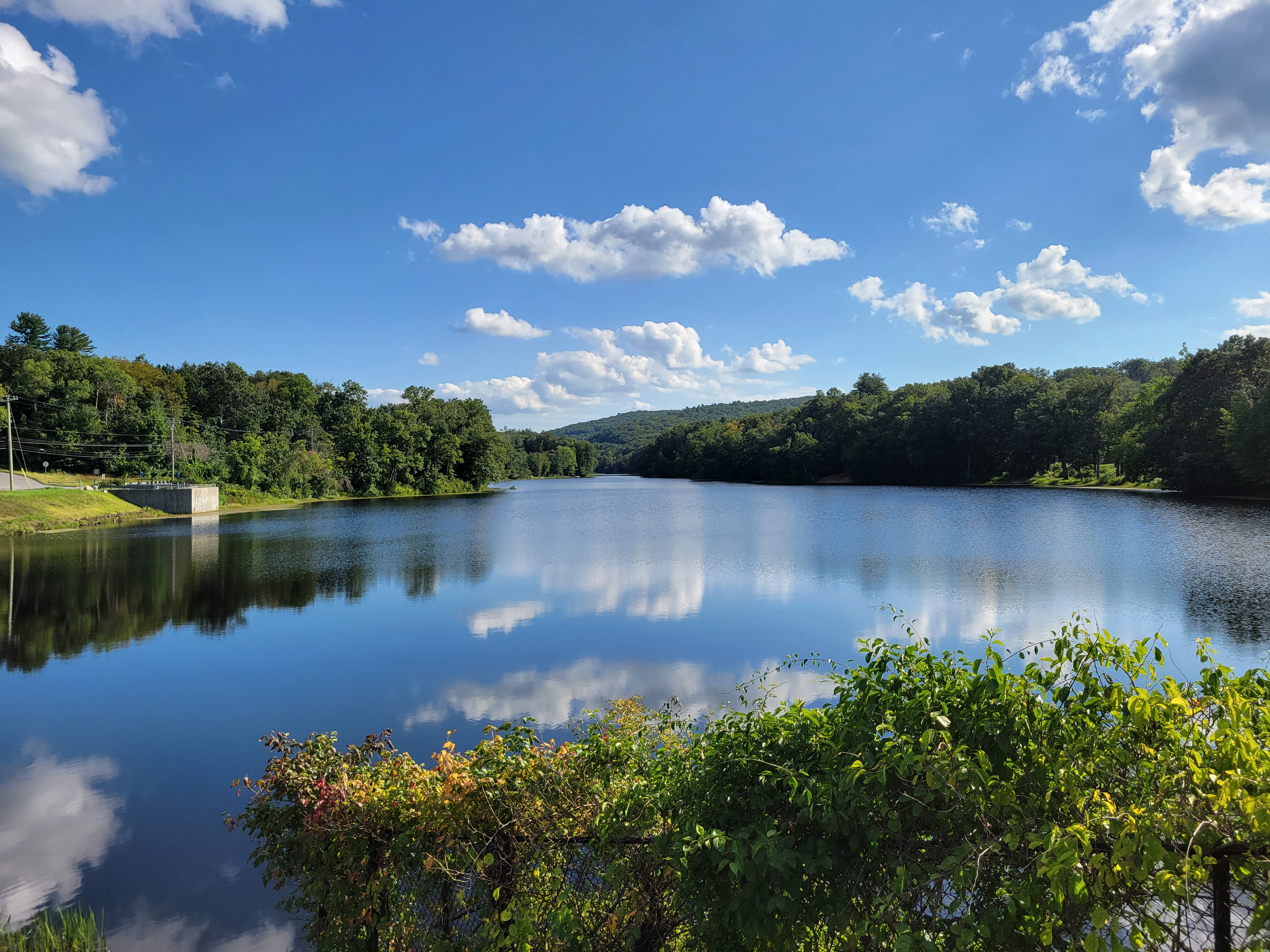
- Higganum Reservoir

- Location in Connecticut
- Location: Haddam, Connecticut
- Coordinates: 41°29′20″N 72°33′34″W
- Type: Reservoir
- Primary inflows: Ponset Brook
- Primary outflows: Ponset Brook
- Max. length: 3,700 feet (1,100 m)
- Max. width: 460 feet (140 m)
- Surface area: 30.79 acres (12.46 ha)
- Average depth: 13.4 feet (4.1 m)
- Max. depth: 34 feet (10 m)
- Residence time: 17 days
- Shore length^{1}: 1.6 miles (2.6 km)
- Surface elevation: 92 feet (28 m)
- Settlements: Higganum
- ^{1} Shore length is not a well-defined measure.

Higganum Reservoir is a 31-acre (13 ha) human-made body of water impounding Ponset Brook in the town of Haddam, Connecticut, United States. It is the primary feature of Higganum Reservoir State Park. Formed by construction of an earth dam in 1868, the reservoir was built to provide water power for the Higganum Manufacturing Company, a maker of plows and other farm equipment. Later known as Clark Cutaway Harrow, the company produced a line that included 400 types of plows, disk harrows, cider presses, hay spreaders, and carriage jacks. The reservoir's original dam had a maximum height of 48 feet and a total length of embankment (including the spillway) of approximately 875 feet. It was reconstructed by the state in 2003. The dam is located at the reservoir's north end; a boat launch maintained by the state is found at its south end.
