= George Bradford Brainerd =

American engineer and photographer

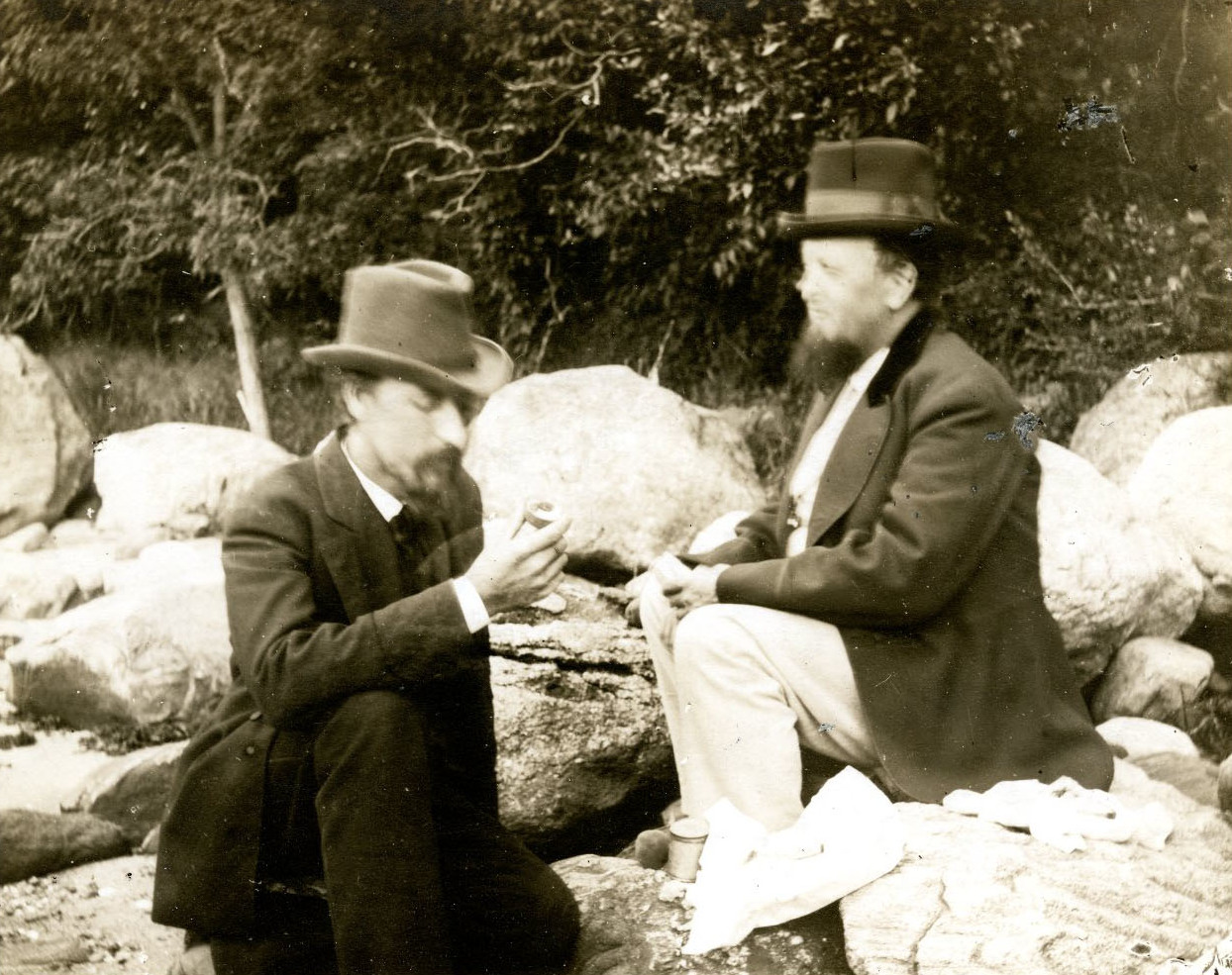
- George Bradford Brainerd, Lunch on the Shore at Great Neck, Long Island, c. 1880s. Brooklyn Museum.
- Born: November 27, 1845; Haddam Neck, Connecticut, United States
- Died: April 13, 1887 (aged 41); Brooklyn, New York, United States
- Education: Rensselaer Polytechnic Institute
- Occupations: Photographer, civil engineer, amateur historian

George Bradford Brainerd (November 27, 1845 – April 13, 1887) was an American civil engineer, amateur photographer, and an amateur natural historian.

== Biography ==
Brainerd was born on November 27, 1845, in Haddam Neck, Connecticut. He attended Rensselaer Polytechnic Institute in Troy, New York, from which he graduated in 1865. While at R.P.I., he, along with seven other men, founded the Theta Xi fraternity. As a civil engineer, Brainerd worked for the then-City of Brooklyn in the position of Deputy Water Purveyor — a position he held for 17 years (1869 to 1886). During this time, Brainerd published the 48-page book The Water Works of Brooklyn (1873).

George Brainerd died on April 13, 1887, at 12:00PM in Brooklyn. He is buried next to a large stone pillar dedicated to him, his parents, and his brother in Old Rock Landing Cemetery in Haddam Neck, Connecticut. He suffered from an acute throat infection and developed a brain tumor in the mid-1880s, which led to a stroke and paralysis. Smoking and frequent exposure to toxic photography chemicals may have contributed to the development of his tumor.

== Works ==
Brainerd's work as an amateur photographer began when he was 13 years old. He began by making his own cameras and developing ambrotypes from them. While working as a civil engineer, Brainerd photographed public work projects, as well as street scenes in Brooklyn. He also took extensive photographs of areas in New York State, including on Long Island and along the Hudson River. His subjects included houses, churches, mills, railroad stations, gate houses, reservoirs, harbors, beaches, and ponds, among others. Over the years, Brainerd continued to design his own cameras and photographic techniques. Through his inventions, he was able to photograph the human vocal organs, thus contributing to the perfection of this type of medical photography. As an amateur natural historian, he amassed a large collection of bird skins, shells, and minerals, as well as maintained his own herbarium, and collected moss and lichens.

Brainerd, a lifelong Brooklynite, produced a total of 2,500 photographs before his death at age 41 in 1887. The majority of his surviving images are of Brooklyn, a vast documentation of the urban landscape—dams and mills, bridges and train depots, engine houses and pumping stations—but also, especially after 1880, images of city dwellers and street scenes.

Brainerd focused on exploring new techniques in photography. His legacy remains in the Brooklyn Museum, with about 1,900 of his glass-plate negatives making up a significant portion of the museum's collection of Brooklyn- and New York-themed glass-plate negatives.

== Gallery ==
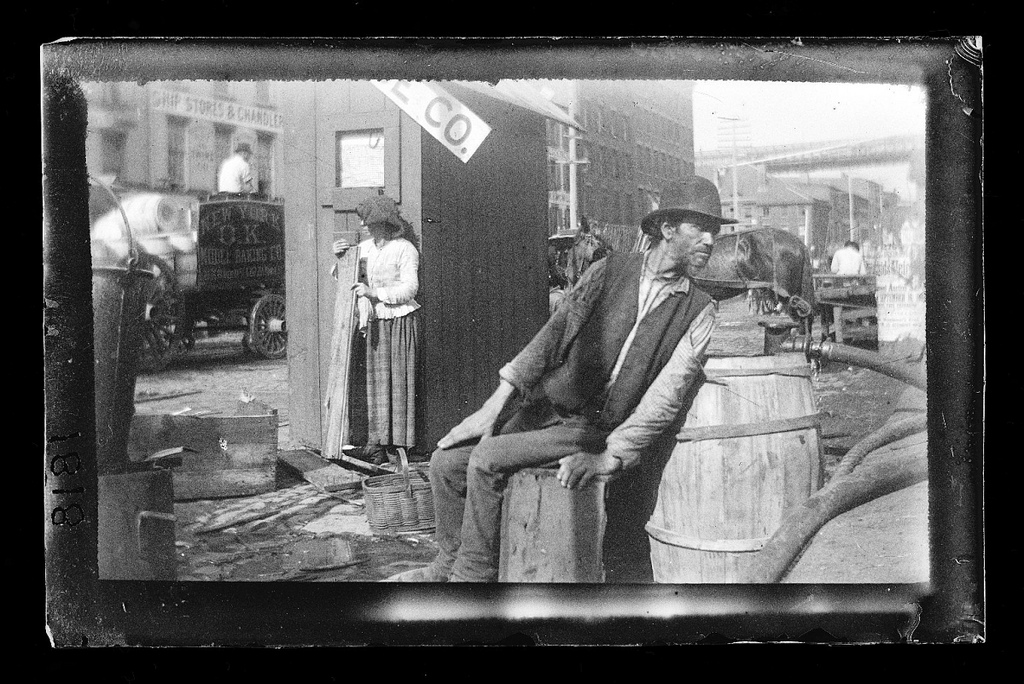
George Bradford Brainerd, Longshoreman, Brooklyn, c. 1872-1887. Brooklyn Museum

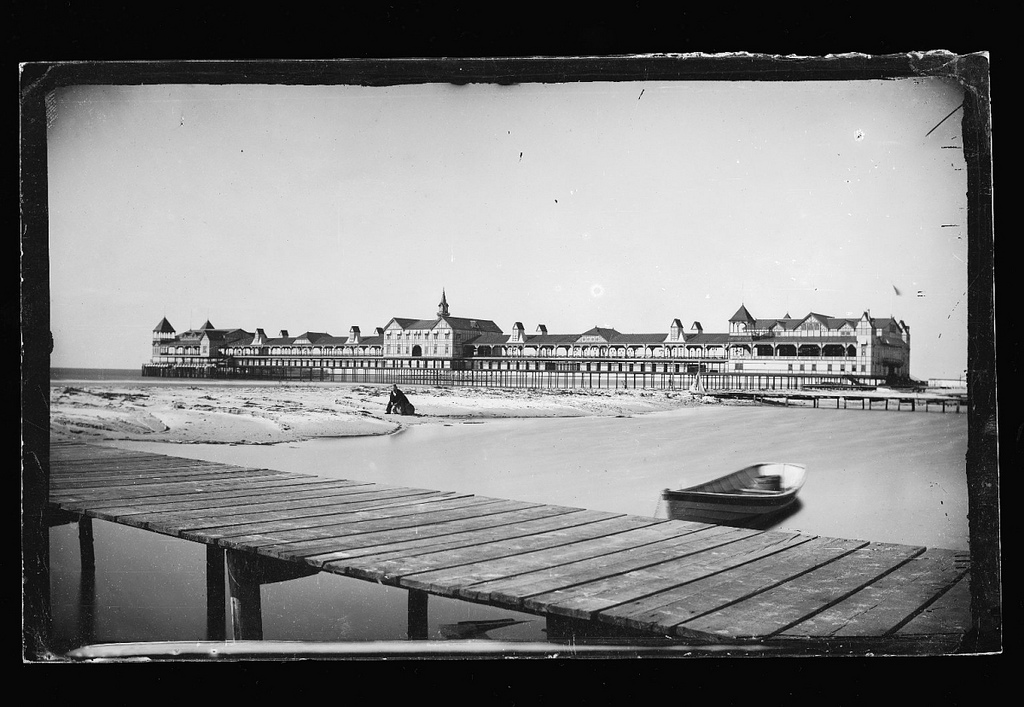
George Bradford Brainerd, Iron Pier, Coney Island, Brooklyn, c. 1872-1887. Brooklyn Museum

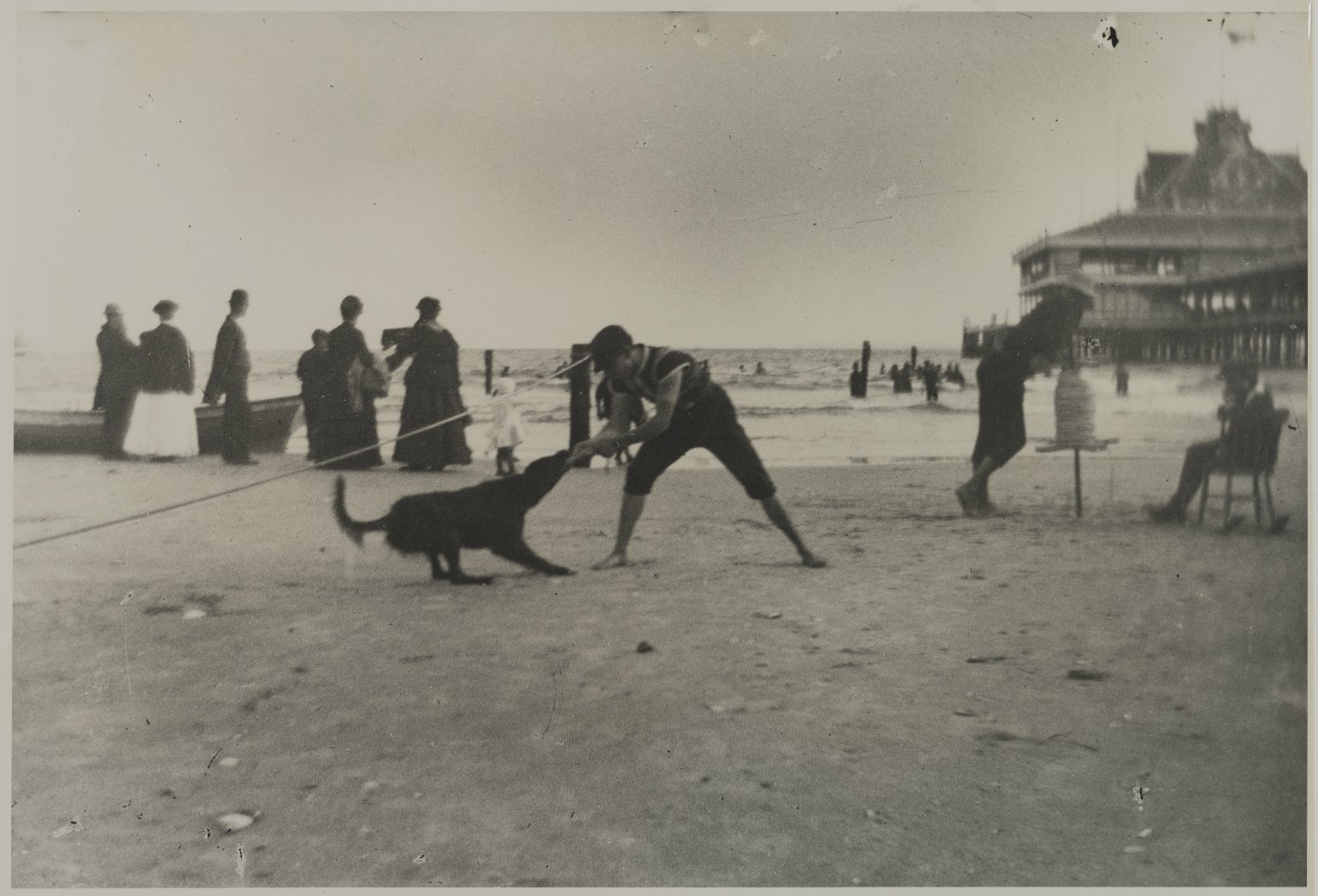
George Bradford Brainerd, Boy and Dog, Iron Pier, Coney Island, Brooklyn,, c. 1885. Glass plate negative, Brooklyn Museum

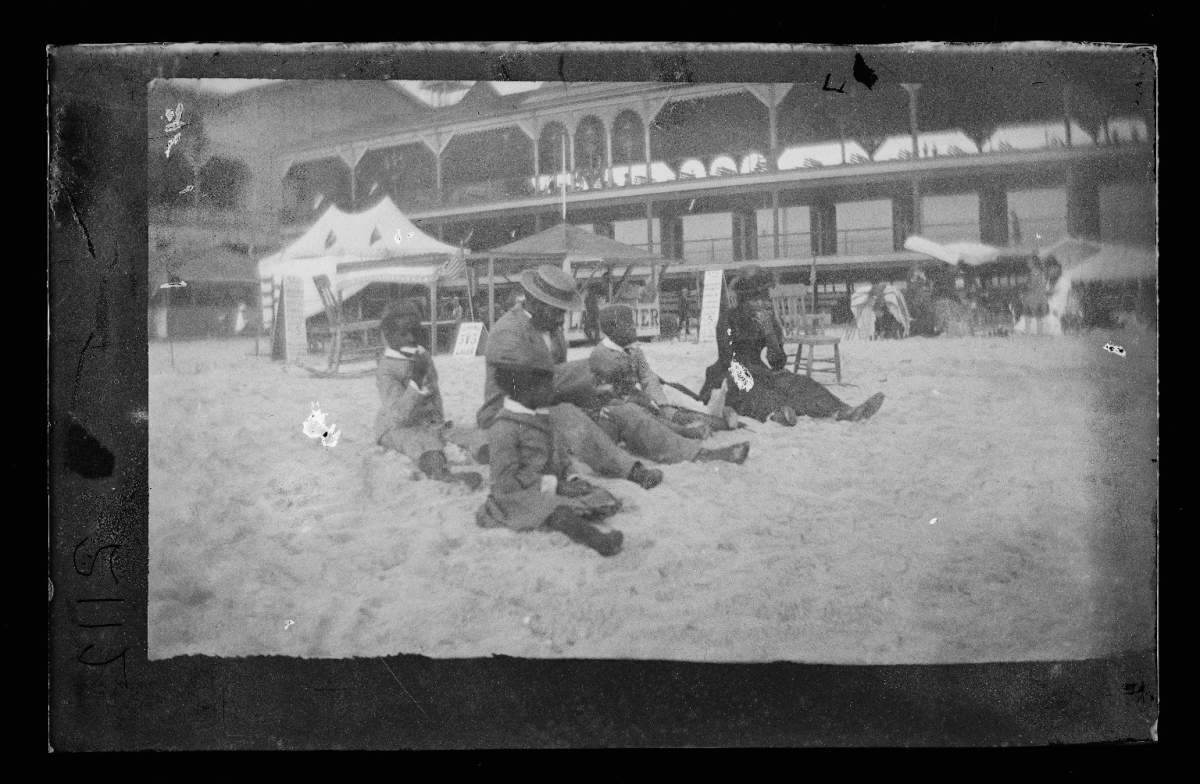
George Bradford Brainerd, Negro Family, Coney Island, Brooklyn, c. 1885. Glass plate negative, Brooklyn Museum

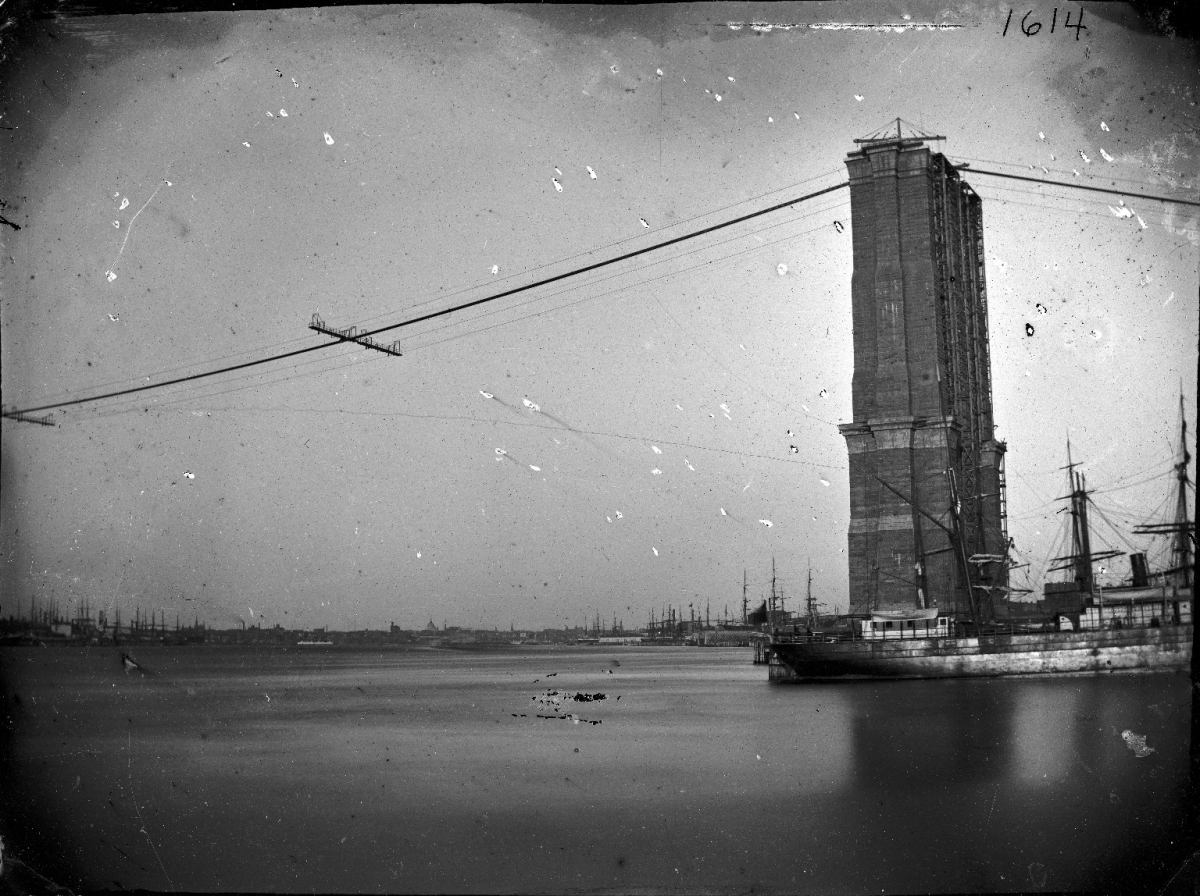
George Bradford Brainerd, Construction of Brooklyn Bridge, c. 1872-1887. Glass plate negative, Brooklyn Museum

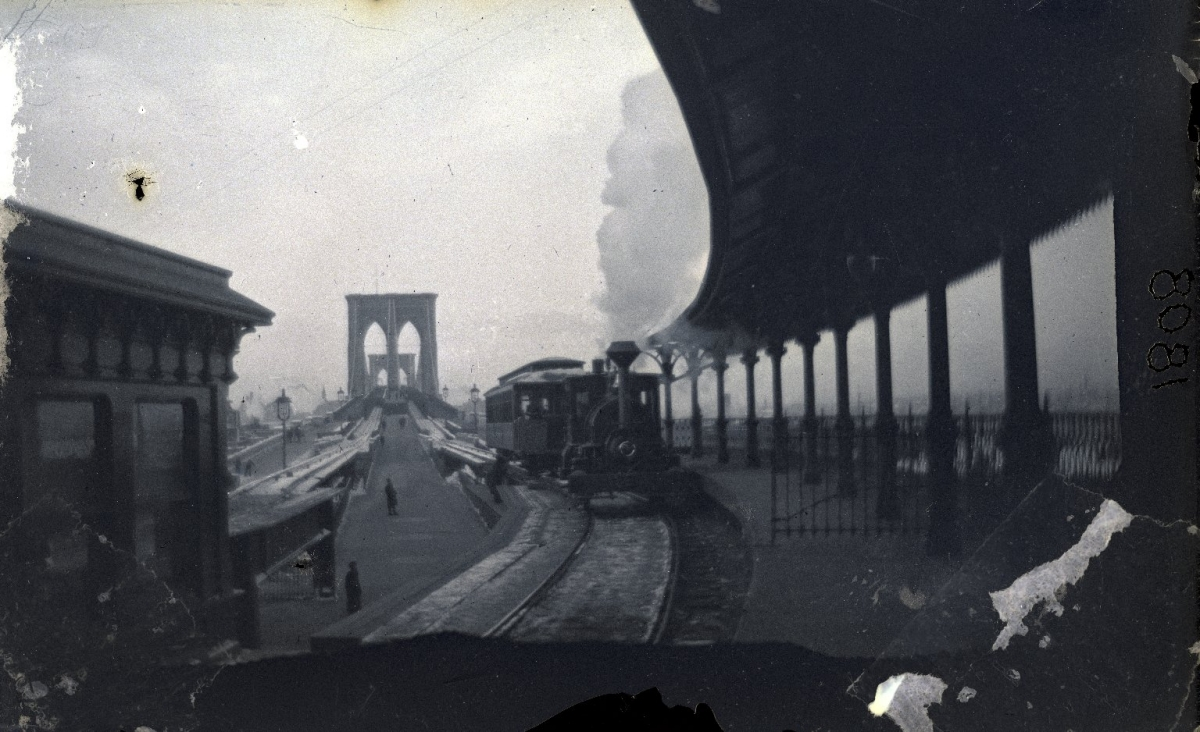
George Bradford Brainerd, Bridge, Brooklyn, NY, c. 1872-1887. Glass plate negative, Brooklyn Museum

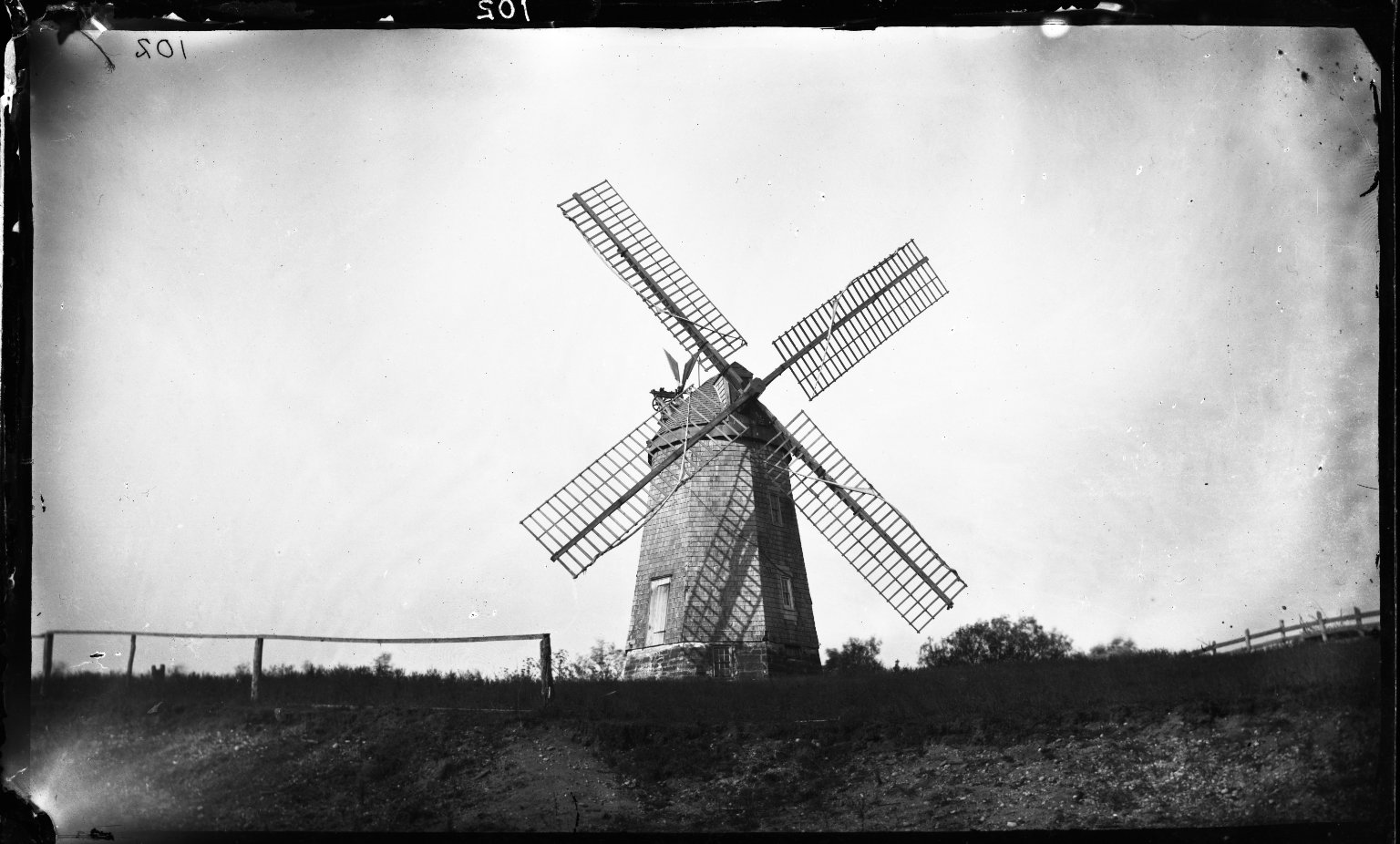
George Bradford Brainerd, (American, 1845-1887). Windmill, Southampton, Long Island, c. 1872-1887. Glass plate negative, Brooklyn Museum

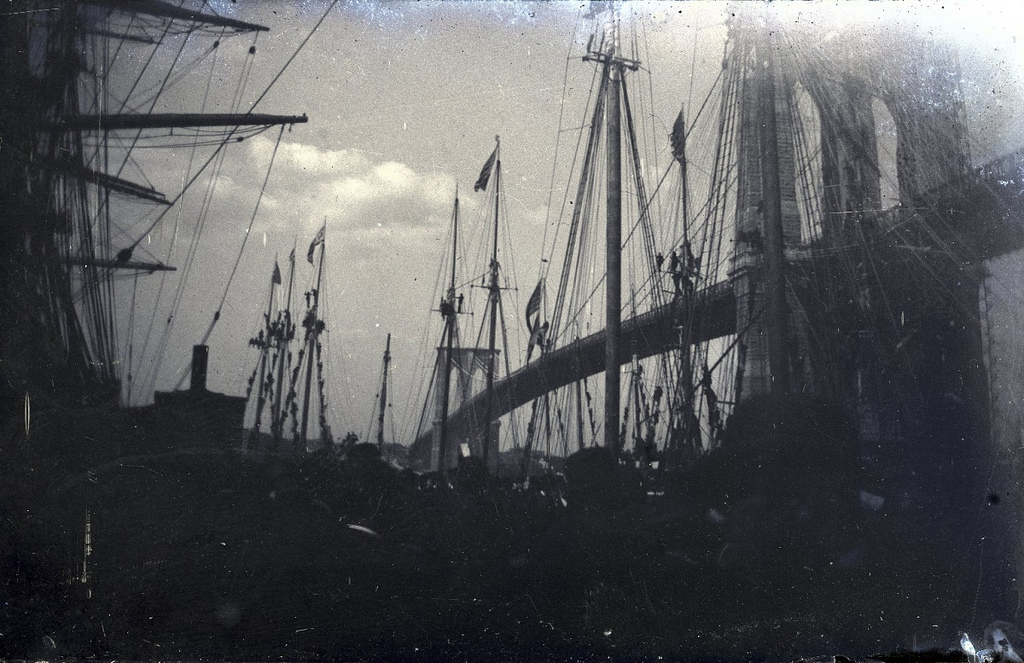
George Bradford Brainerd, Bridge Street, c. 1872-1887. Glass plate negative, Brooklyn Museum

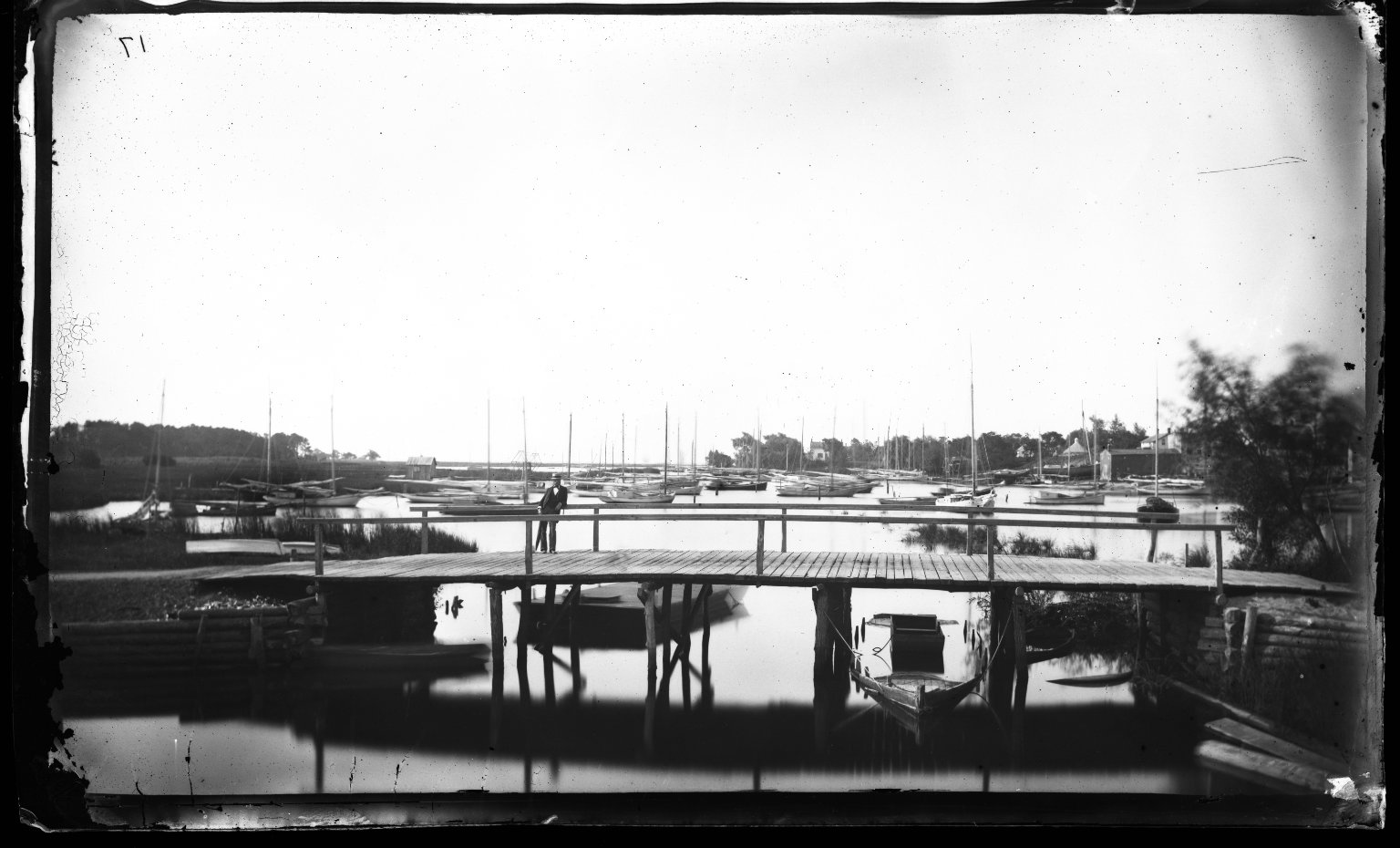
George Bradford Brainerd, Creek, Patchogue, Long Island, c. 1872-1878. Glass plate negative, Brooklyn Museum

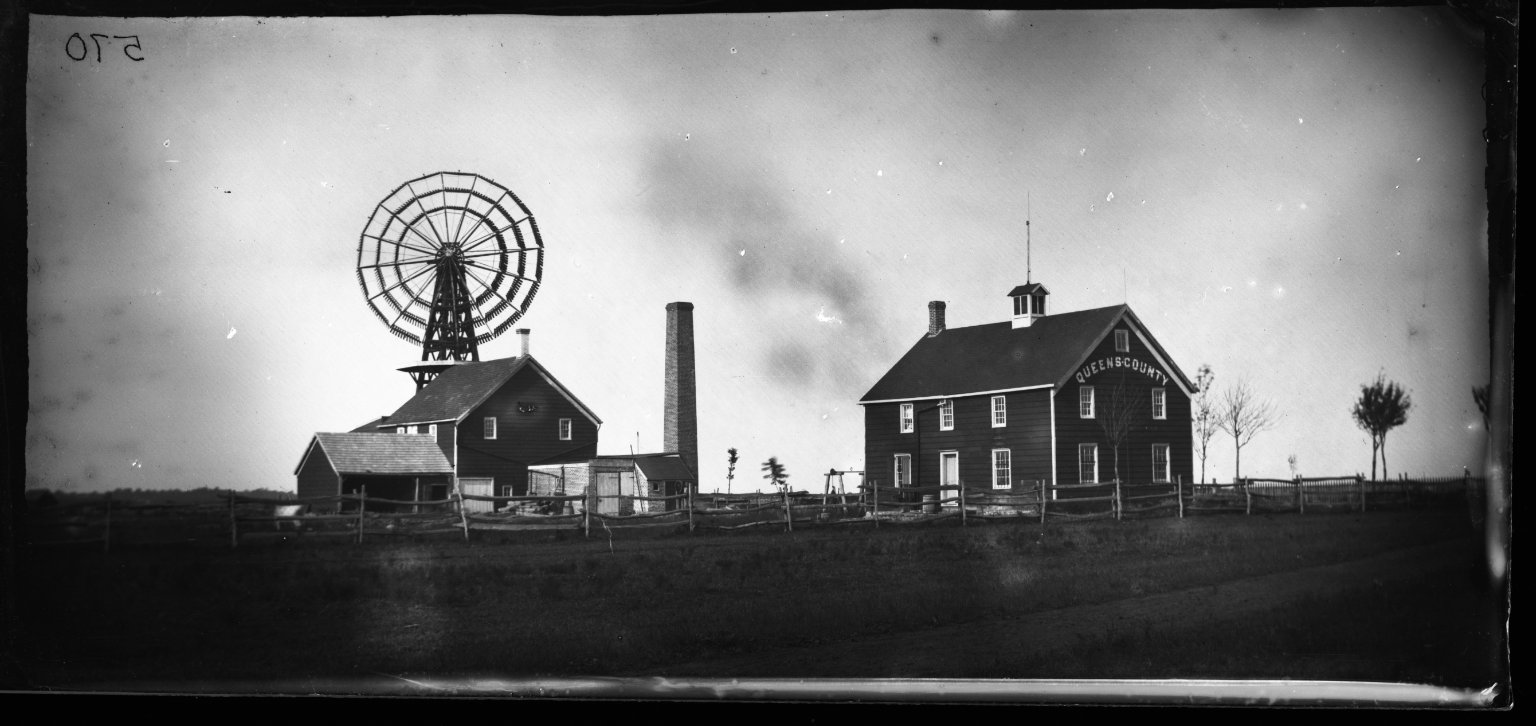
George Bradford Brainerd, Soap Works, Hicksville, Long Island,, 1878. Glass plate negative, Brooklyn Museum
