= Camp Bethel =

- U.S. National Register of Historic Places
- U.S. Historic district
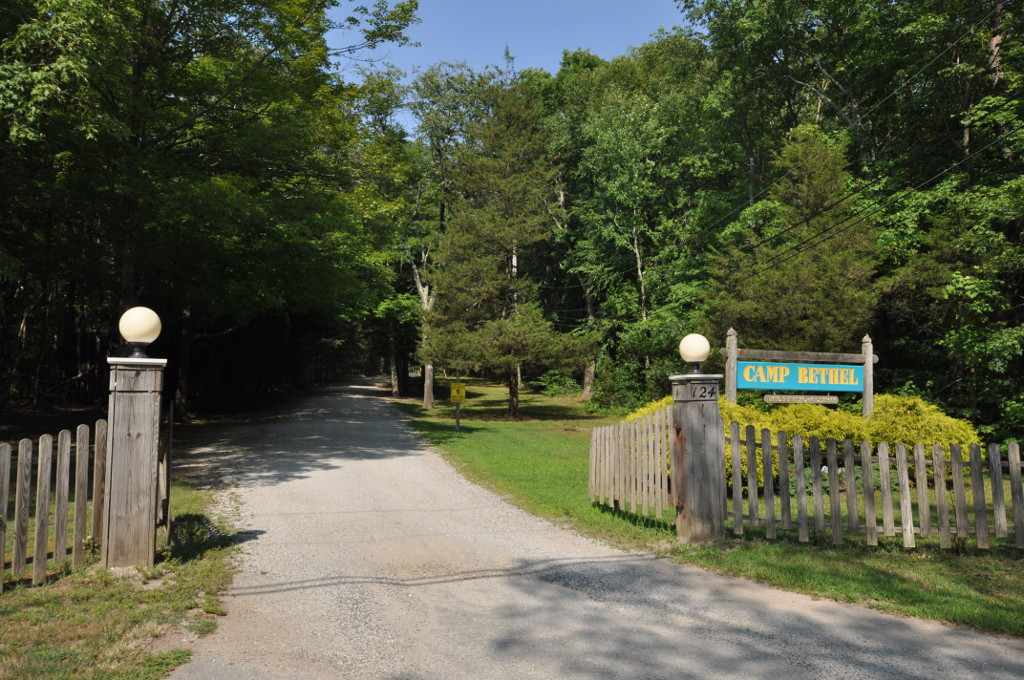
- Entrance to Camp Bethel

- Location within Connecticut Location within the United States
- Location: 124 Camp Bethel Road, Haddam, Connecticut
- Coordinates: 41°27′11″N 72°28′24″W
- Area: 46.7 acres (18.9 ha)
- Built: 1877
- Architectural style: Gothic, Seasonal cottage
- NRHP reference No.: 07001246
- Added to NRHP: December 11, 2007

Camp Bethel is a historic Christian camp meeting facility at 124 Camp Bethel Road, overlooking the Connecticut River in Haddam, Connecticut. Founded in 1877, Camp Bethel is one of the few surviving camp meeting sites left in New England. It is owned by the Camp Bethel Association (CBA), a non-denominational, evangelical organization and is open to rent. The camp was added to the National Register of Historic Places in 2007.

== Description and history ==
Camp Bethel is located in southeastern Haddam, just north of the East Haddam Bridge over the Connecticut River. It is accessed via Camp Bethel Road, which runs north from Connecticut Route 82. It is located on a bluff overlooking the Connecticut River, surrounded by woods. The main facilities of the camp include a chapel, memorial hall, boarding houses, and a dining hall, as well as more than 40 cabins. Most of these facilities were built between 1889 and about 1920; the dining hall is the notable exception, built in 1992 after the old dining hall burned down.

The camp was established in 1877 by the Life and Advent Union, a division of Seventh Day Adventism which split in 1863 (at an Adventist revival camp in Wilbraham, Massachusetts). Functioning mainly at other Adventist camps throughout New England, they located this site as a permanent base on land leased from a local farmer named Clark. It was the third revival camp established in the state, and the first known to be for an Adventist denomination. As with most camps, early revivals were held in temporary structures, mainly tents, including large ones for use as dining and worship halls. In 1964 the camp was formally renamed "Camp Bethel", and its ownership was converted to a non-denominational not-for-profit organization. It is still used as an organizing center for missionary work; its facilities are sometimes leased to other organizations.

== See also ==
- National Register of Historic Places listings in Middlesex County, Connecticut
