= David McDowell =

American psychiatrist (1963–2014)

David M. McDowell (1963–2014) was an American psychiatrist, author and creative consultant. He co-founded the Substance Treatment and Research Service at Columbia University and served as its medical director. He also founded Columbia's Buprenorphine Program, the first of such treatment program for opiate addiction in the United States, which according to The New York Times had an 88% success rate. His scholarly work has focused on co-occurring psychiatric disorders and substance abuse problems, particularly club drugs and marijuana. McDowell's book Substance Abuse: From Principles to Practice, is one of the more highly regarded and accessible books on the subject, and is excerpted in the American Psychiatric Association's textbook on substance abuse treatment.

== Background ==
McDowell was born in Haddam, Connecticut. In 1985 McDowell graduated cum laude from College of the Holy Cross with a Bachelor of Arts and a Master of Arts. He then attended Columbia University College of Physicians & Surgeons until 1989, interned in medicine at NewYork-Presbyterian Hospital, and did his residency in psychiatry at the College of Physicians & Surgeons. He is board certified in psychiatry with qualifications in addiction psychiatry by the American Board of Psychiatry and Neurology, and was a visiting clinical fellow at the College of Physicians and Surgeons, and a fellow in the Division of Alcoholism and Substance Abuse at NYU Medical Center.

== Career ==
In 1995, McDowell joined the faculty of Columbia University's Division on Substance Abuse in the Department of Psychiatry. He co-founded the school's Substance Treatment and Research Service (STARS) with Herbert Kleber, former Assistant Drug Czar in the George H. W. Bush administration. McDowell acted as the medical director until 2004, and retains a position as senior medical adviser. In 2004, he founded the Buprenorphine Program at Columbia University, the first such opiate treatment program in the United States.

== Recognition ==
- 2006–2014 - Best Doctors in America, 2006–2014
- 2006 - Senior Distinguished Psychiatrist Award, American Psychiatric Association
- 1992 - The Secretary of Health and Human Services' Task Force to Link Primary Care, Substance Abuse, and HIV
- 1989 - Columbia University College of Physicians and Surgeons Alumni Award for Contributions to the Life of the School
- 1989 - American Medical Association Rock Sleyster Scholar for Promise in the Field of Psychiatry
- 1989 - Aaron Diamond Human Rights and Medicine Extern, Argentina
- 1987-89 - Joseph Collins Scholar for Humanitarian Interest in Medicine
