= Thankful Arnold House Museum =

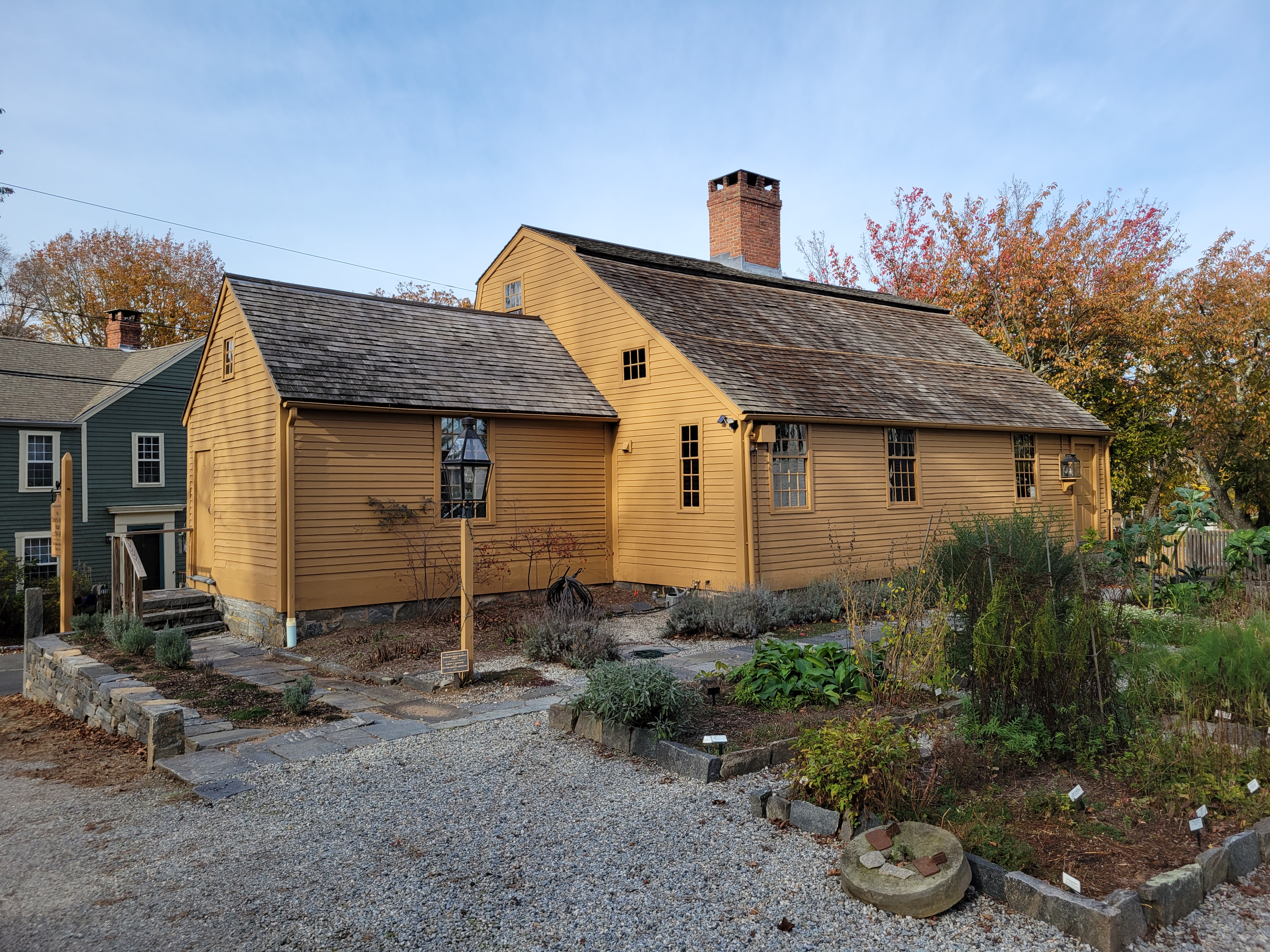
- Thankful Arnold House Museum

- Location within Connecticut
- Established: 1965
- Location: 14 Hayden Hill Road; Haddam, Connecticut, US
- Coordinates: 41.48°N 72.519°W
- Type: Historic house museum
- Executive director: Elizabeth Malloy
- Owner: Haddam Historical Society
- Website: haddamhistory.org

The Thankful Arnold House Museum is an American historic house museum in Haddam, Connecticut. It consists of a gambrel-roofed house built circa 1800, along with a garden and grounds. The museum is open year-round.

== Description and history ==
Built between 1794 and 1810, the house's namesake was Thankful Arnold (d. 1849). She had 11 children in 15 years of marriage and continued to live in the house after her husband Joseph's death in 1823. The museum's director described the widow as a "typical river valley housewife" of the post-American Revolution generation.

The house remained in the Arnold family until her great-great-grandson, Isaac Arnold, purchased it in 1963, paid for it to be restored, and donated it to the Haddam Historical Society. The house opened to the public that same year.

Named in honor of Isaac's daughter, the Wilhelmina Ann Arnold Barnhart Memorial Garden was dedicated in 1973. Plantings include herbs and vegetables commonly grown in the region's household gardens circa 1830.

The museum is a stop on the Connecticut Women's Heritage Trail.
