= Smith Clark =

American politician (1790s–1876)

- Born: 1791/1792
- Died: September 12, 1876 (aged 84); Haddam, Connecticut, US
- Education: Yale College (1817)
- Occupations: Lawyer; legislator

Member of the Connecticut House of Representatives from the Haddam district
- In office January 1827 – June 1827 Serving with Simon Shailor
- Governor: Oliver Wolcott Jr.; Gideon Tomlinson
- Preceded by: George W. Smith
- Succeeded by: Charles Arnold

Smith Clark was a lawyer and legislator in 19th-century Connecticut.

Clark was born in 1791 or 1792, and went on to graduate from Yale College in 1817. A lifelong lawyer in his home town of Haddam, Connecticut, Clark also served as a probate court judge.

Clark was a representative from Haddam in the Connecticut General Assembly for a single term. In January 1827, Clark took the seat of George W. Smith and served alongside Simon Shailor through that June. Clark's seat was picked up by Charles Arnold the following February.

On September 12, 1876, Clark died at the age of 84; he was survived by one son.
