= James Hazelton House =

Historic house in Connecticut, United States

- U.S. National Register of Historic Places
- U.S. Historic district – Contributing property
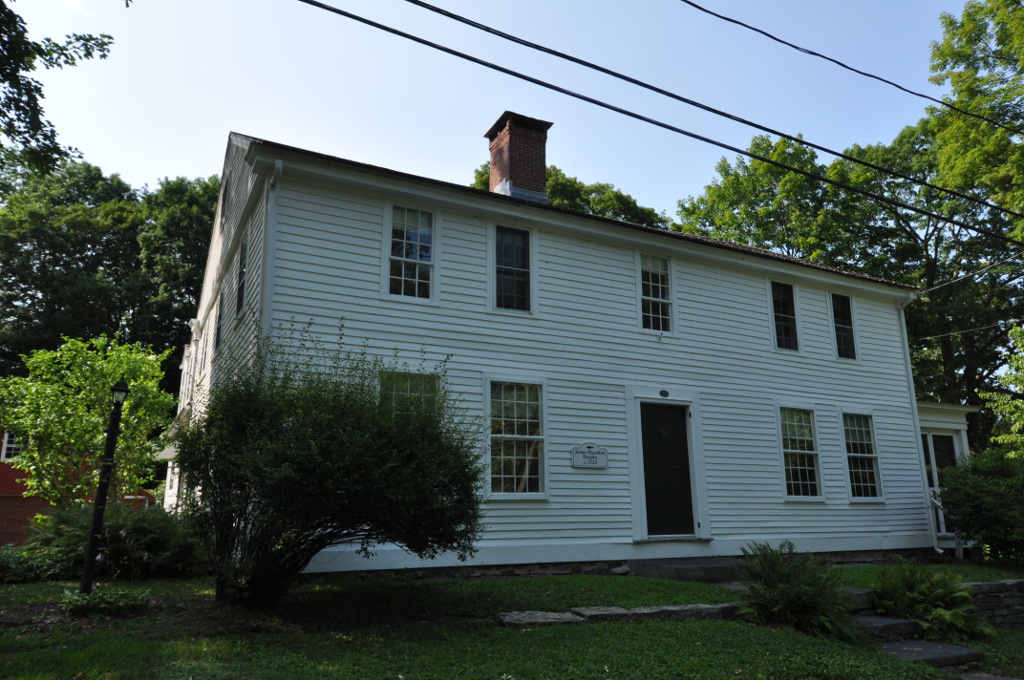

- Location within Connecticut Location within the United States
- Location: 23 Hayden Hill Road, Haddam, Connecticut
- Coordinates: 41°28′46″N 72°31′6″W
- Area: 4 acres (1.6 ha)
- Built: c.1720 and 1915
- Architect: Hazelton, James
- Architectural style: Colonial, Post-medieval English
- Part of: Haddam Center Historic District (ID89000012)
- NRHP reference No.: 88001468

Significant dates
- Added to NRHP: November 16, 1988
- Designated CP: February 9, 1989

The James Hazelton House, also known as the Hazelton-Hayden House, is a historic house at 23 Hayden Hill Road in Haddam, Connecticut. With a construction history dating to about 1720, it is one of the town's oldest buildings, with a long history of ownership by a single prominent local family. The house was listed on the National Register of Historic Places in 1988, and is a contributing property in the Haddam Center Historic District.

== Description and history ==
The James Hazelton House is located north of the town center of Haddam, on the west side of Hayden Hill Road a short way south of its junction with Walkley Hill Road. It is a 2 1/2-story wood-frame structure, with a gabled roof, central chimney, and clapboarded exterior. Its main facade is five bays wide, with a center entrance, flanked by slightly asymmetrically placed windows. The interior of the house exhibits finishes and alterations from a wide variety of dates, most notably from the early and late 18th century.

The house's oldest portion, the southern end, was built by James Hazelton (1694–1773), an early settler of the Haddam area, in about 1720, and was widened in about 1780 and the rear leanto section added. Hazelton's son had no children, and willed the property to a "kinsman" (thought to be either a close friend or distant relation), John Hayden, and his son Arnold Hazelton Hayden, in the early 19th century. The house remained in the Hayden family at least into the late 20th century. A 1 1/2-story ell was added to the rear in the 19th century. The house is a well-preserved example of a late First Period house, with a well-preserved evolutionary history.

== See also ==
- National Register of Historic Places listings in Middlesex County, Connecticut
- List of the oldest buildings in Connecticut
