= Haddam Center Historic District =

Historic district in Connecticut, United States

- U.S. National Register of Historic Places
- U.S. Historic district
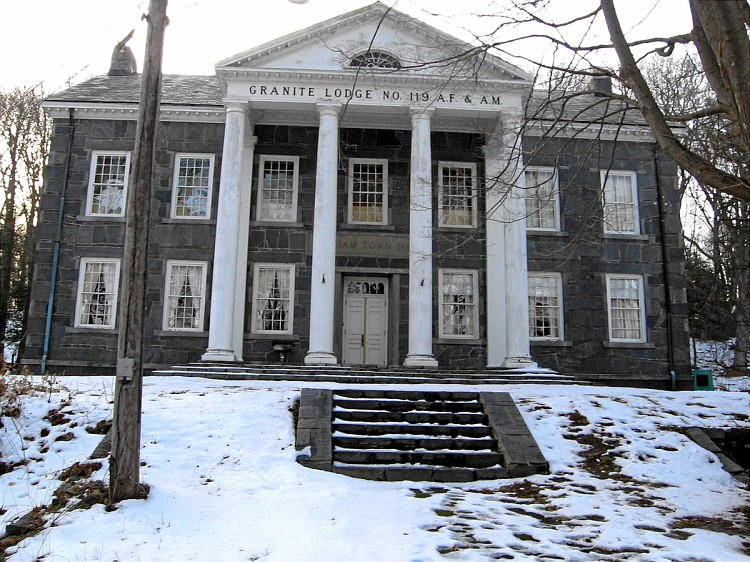
- The former town hall

- Location within Connecticut Location within the United States
- Location: Roughly 2.5 miles (4.0 km) along Walkley Hill Road and CT 154/Saybrook Road, Haddam, Connecticut
- Coordinates: 41°28′46″N 72°30′55″W
- Area: 267 acres (108 ha)
- Architectural style: Greek Revival, Colonial, and Federal
- NRHP reference No.: 89000012
- Added to NRHP: February 9, 1989

The Haddam Center Historic District is a 267-acre (108 ha) historic district encompassing the institutional and residential center of the town of Haddam, Connecticut that was listed on the National Register of Historic Places in 1989 as a result of efforts by the Haddam Historical Society.

The town center of Haddam was first laid out in 1662, when land was set aside for a colonial meeting house, a minister's house, and land for the minister. The town's early growth was slow, because the terrain was not very suitable for agriculture. After American independence, the town began to grow more substantially, buoyed by construction of the Middlesex Turnpike along what are now CT 154 and Walkley Hill Road. The town center grew as a stop on the turnpike, and also benefited from traffic along the Connecticut River, which formed its eastern boundary. The introduction of steamship and railroad traffic beginning around 1850 led to a decline in the town's fortunes.

The district is basically linear in nature, extending about 2.5 miles (4.0 km) along CT 154 and Walkley Hill Road. It boasts a fine collection of Federal period residential architecture, and a number of institutional and civic buildings constructed in the mid-19th century out of locally quarried granite. It includes the James Hazelton House, at 23 Hayden Hill Rd., which is separately NRHP-listed, as well as the Brainerd Memorial Library.

== See also ==
- National Register of Historic Places listings in Middlesex County, Connecticut
