= Haddam, Connecticut =

Haddam
- Town
- Town of Haddam
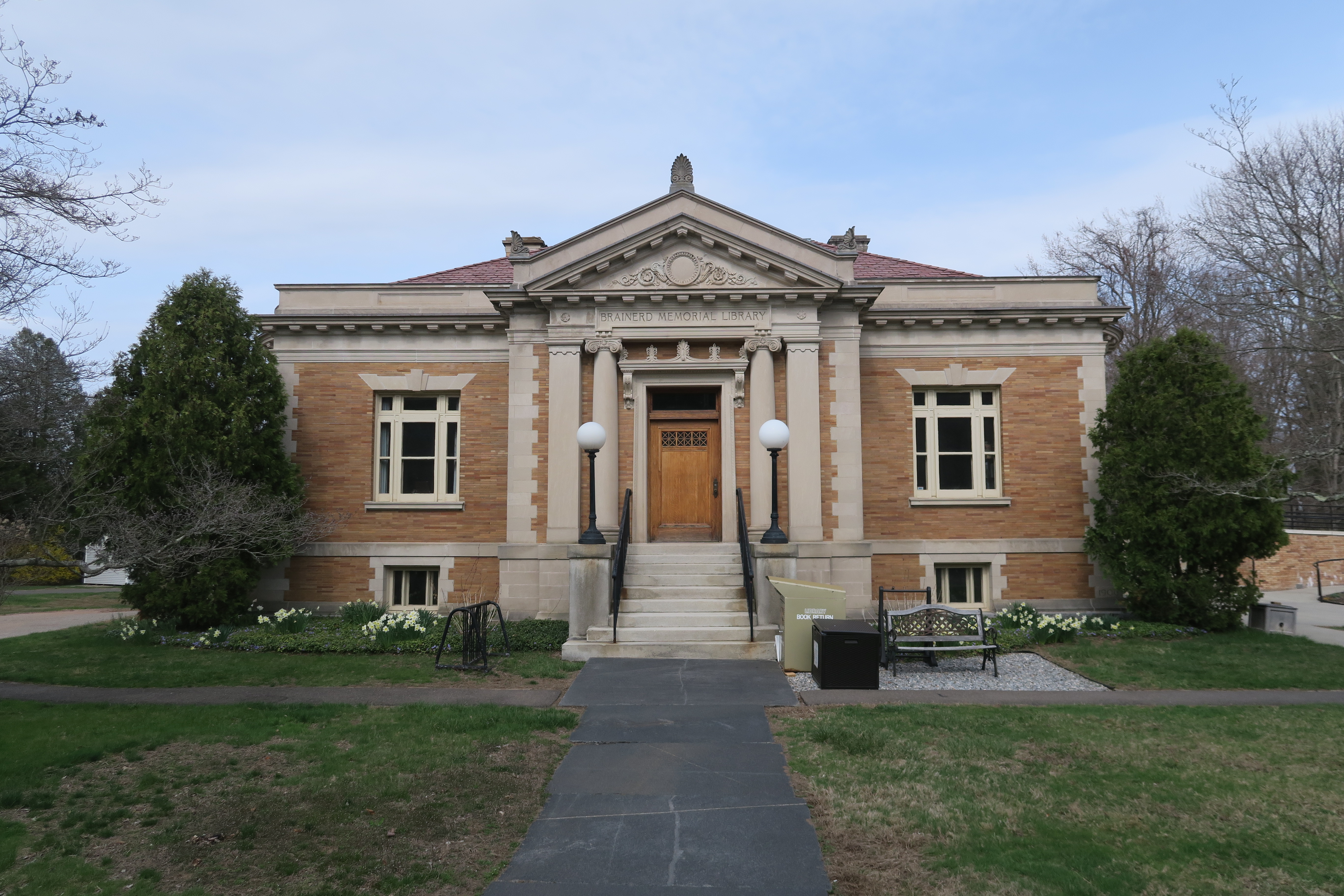
- Brainerd Memorial Library

- Seal
- Interactive map of Haddam
- Coordinates: 41°27′58″N 72°32′39″W
- Country: United States
- U.S. state: Connecticut
- County: Middlesex
- Region: Lower CT River Valley
- Incorporated: 1668

Government
  - Type: Selectman-town meeting
  - First selectman: Robert McGarry (R)
  - Selectman: Sean Kennedy-Wonneberger (D)
  - Selectman: Kate Anderson (R)

Area
  - Total: 46.4 sq mi (120.2 km^{2})
  - Land: 44.0 sq mi (114.0 km^{2})
  - Water: 2.3 sq mi (6.0 km^{2})
- Elevation: 371 ft (113 m)

Population (2020)
  - Total: 8,452
  - Density: 192/sq mi (74.1/km^{2})
- Time zone: UTC-5 (Eastern)
  - Summer (DST): UTC-4 (Eastern)
- ZIP code: 06424, 06438, 06441
- Area codes: 860/959
- FIPS code: 09-35230
- GNIS feature ID: 0213439
- Website: www.haddam.org

Haddam is a town in Middlesex County, Connecticut, United States. The town is part of the Lower Connecticut River Valley Planning Region. The population was 8,452 at the time of the 2020 census. It is the only town in Connecticut that the Connecticut River runs through the middle of instead of at the town's border edge. The town was also home to the now-decommissioned Connecticut Yankee Nuclear Power Plant.

== History ==
Haddam, in Middlesex County, is located in south-central Connecticut in the lower Connecticut River Valley. It is also home to Cockaponset State Forest. It was incorporated in October 1668 as Hadham, but unusually for the many New England towns ending in -ham, the spelling eventually came to reflect the phonetic pronunciation. Haddam is the only town in Connecticut divided by the Connecticut River, and only one of three divided towns along the entire Connecticut River, the other two being Northfield, Massachusetts, and Pittsburg, New Hampshire. Haddam contains five villages: Hidden Lake, Higganum, Shailerville, and Tylerville on the west side of the river, and Haddam Neck on the east. For the first two hundred years of the town's existence, the Connecticut River was a major source of income and transportation. Today, the town of Haddam is a residential community.

The town was named for Much Hadham and Little Hadham in Hertfordshire, England, collectively known as The Hadhams.

== Demographics ==
Historical population
Census	Pop.	Note	%±
1790	2,195		—
1800	2,307		5.1%
1810	2,205		−4.4%
1820	2,478		12.4%
1830	3,025		22.1%
1840	2,599		−14.1%
1850	2,279		−12.3%
1860	2,307		1.2%
1870	2,071		−10.2%
1880	2,419		16.8%
1890	2,095		−13.4%
1900	2,015		−3.8%
1910	1,958		−2.8%
1920	1,736		−11.3%
1930	1,755		1.1%
1940	2,069		17.9%
1950	2,636		27.4%
1960	3,466		31.5%
1970	4,934		42.4%
1980	6,383		29.4%
1990	6,769		6.0%
2000	7,157		5.7%
2010	8,346		16.6%
2020	8,452		1.3%
U.S. Decennial Census

As of the census of 2000, there were 7,157 people, 2,701 households, and 2,101 families residing in the town. The population density was 162.5 inhabitants per square mile (62.7/km^{2}). There were 2,822 housing units at an average density of 24.7 persons/km^{2} (64.1 inhabitants/mi^{2}). The racial makeup of the town was 96.86% White, 1.03% African American, 0.11% Native American, 0.82% Asian, 0.03% Pacific Islander, 0.17% from other races, and 0.98% from two or more races. 1.06% of the population were Hispanic or Latino of any race.

There were 2,701 households, out of which 34.5% had children under the age of 18 living with them, 68.1% were married couples living together, 6.9% had a woman whose husband does not live with her, and 22.2% were non-families. 18.1% of all households were made up of individuals, and 7.0% had someone living alone who was 65 years of age or older. The average household size was 2.64 and the average family size was 3.00.

In the town, the population was spread out, with 24.7% under the age of 18, 5.0% from 18 to 24, 30.2% from 25 to 44, 30.4% from 45 to 64, and 9.7% who were 65 years of age or older. The median age was 40 years. For every 100 females, there were 102.0 males. For every 100 females age 18 and over, there were 97.8 males.

The median income for a household in the town was $78,571, and the median income for a family was $87,026. Males had a median income of $50,500 versus $37,447 for females. The per capita income for the town was $30,519. 3.5% of the population and 1.5% of families were below the poverty line. Out of the total people living in poverty, 4.6% were under the age of 18 and 7.2% were 65 or older.

== Government ==
Voter Registration and Party Enrollment as of October 25, 2005
Party	Active Voters	Inactive Voters	Total Voters	Percentage
Democratic	1,493	49	1,542	27.68%
Republican	1,205	44	1,249	22.42%
Unaffiliated	2,633	139	2,772	49.77%
Minor Parties	6	1	7	0.13%
Total	5,337	233	5,570	100%

== Notable people ==
- Samuel Arnold, politician
- David Brainerd, missionary
- George Bradford Brainerd, engineer, photographer, and nature historian
- Smith Clark, lawyer and legislator
- Mary H. Dickerson, businesswoman
- David Dudley Field II, politician
- Stephen Johnson Field, politician and jurist
- Josiah J. Hazen, college football player and coach
- Asahel W. Hubbard, attorney, judge, and politician
- David McDowell, psychiatrist, author, and consultant
- Emil Planeta, MLB pitcher
- Alexander Shaler, military general
- Venture Smith, enslaved African and author
- James Clark Walkley, politician

== Literary references ==
- The "thin men of Haddam" are apostrophized in stanza seven of "Thirteen Ways of Looking at a Blackbird" by Wallace Stevens:

O thin men of Haddam,
Why do you imagine golden birds?
Do you not see how the blackbird
Walks around the feet
Of the women about you?

== Notable locations and historic sites ==
- Connecticut Yankee Nuclear Power Plant
- Higganum Landing Historic District, NRHP-listed
- Camp Bethel – a historic religious camp at 124 Camp Bethel Road, built in 1877 and added to the National Register of Historic Places (NRHP) in 2007
- The town center village, listed as the Haddam Center Historic District on the NRHP
- James Hazelton House, NRHP-listed
- Thankful Arnold House Museum, a stop on the Connecticut Women's Heritage Trail
